= Oud Eik en Duinen =

Cemetery in the Netherlands

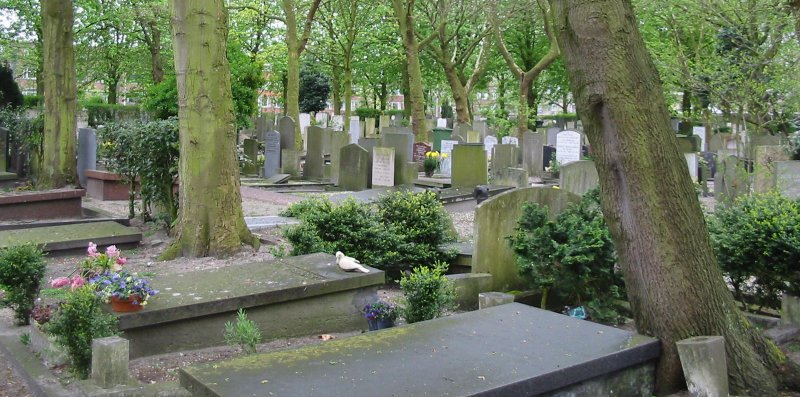
- Oud Eik en Duinen
- Interactive map of Oud Eik en Duinen

Details
- Established: 1247; 779 years ago
- Location: The Hague
- Country: the Netherlands
- Coordinates: 52.0669°N 4.2644°E
- Size: 24 acres (9.7 ha)

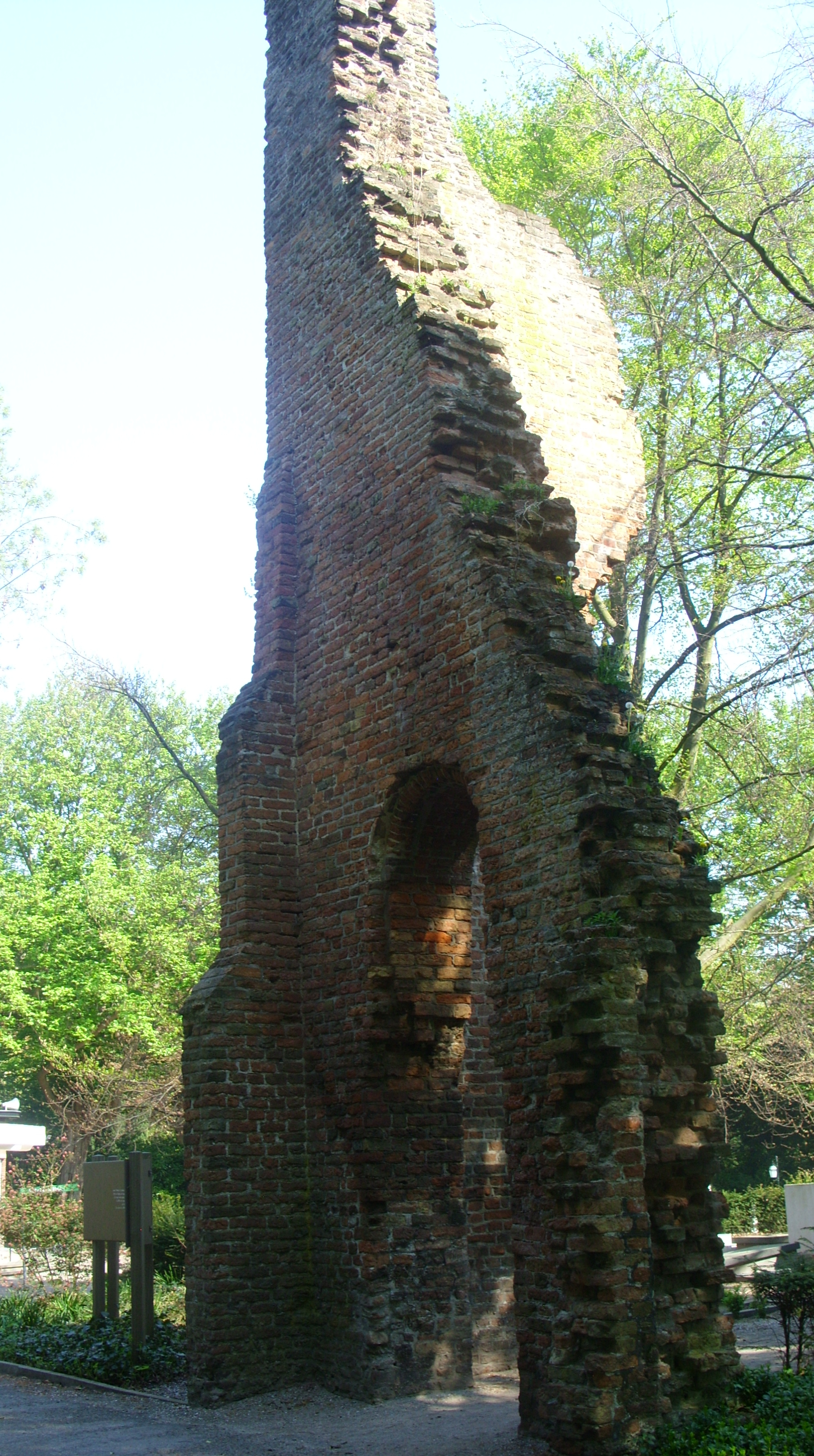
Ruin of chapel, built around 1247

Oud Eik en Duinen is a cemetery in The Hague, the Netherlands, formerly called Eik en Duinen and also nicknamed "the Dutch Père-Lachaise". The cemetery is built around a chapel constructed around 1247 by William II of Holland in honor of his father, Floris IV, Count of Holland. This chapel was partially demolished in 1581, and in the 17th century the area was again used as a cemetery. When Eik en Duinen was full, a new cemetery, Nieuw Eykenduynen, was constructed in 1891 across the road, and since then the old cemetery is known as "Old" Eik en Duinen.

== A ==
- Peter van Anrooy (1879–1954), composer, conductor
- Jan Apol (1874–1945), painter
- Simone Arnoux (1915–2001), spouse of Prince Aschwin of Lippe-Biesterfeld, brother of Prince Bernhard of Lippe-Biesterfeld
- Tobias Asser (1838–1913), lawyer and winner of the Nobel Peace Prize in 1911.
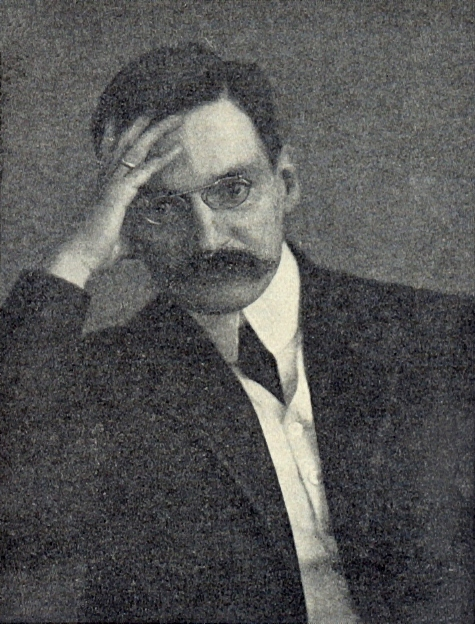
Peter van Anrooy

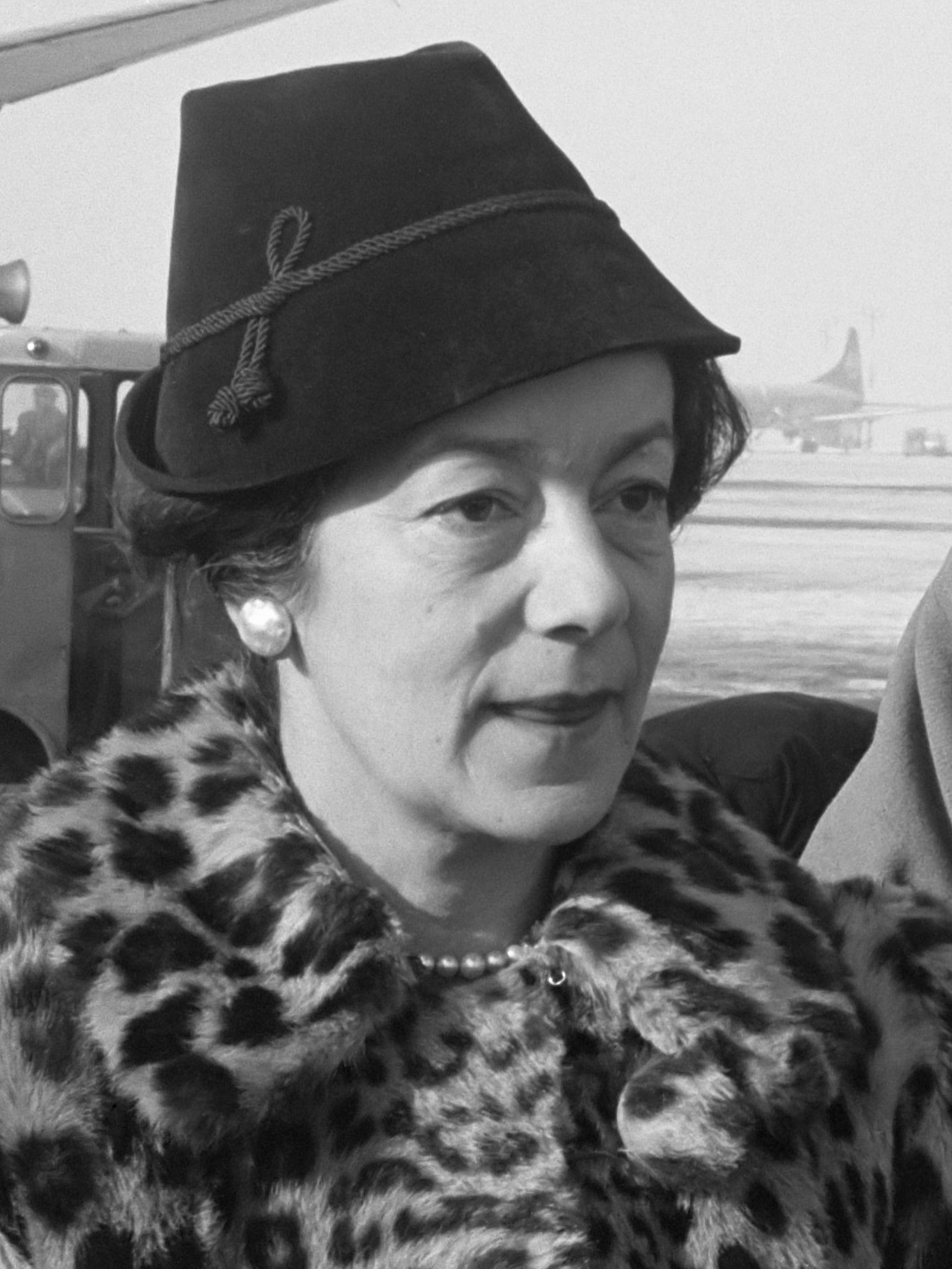
Simone Arnoux

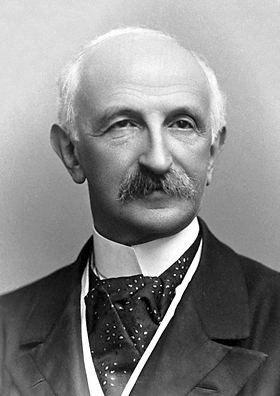
T.M.C Asser

== B ==
- Daniel Johannes von Balluseck (1895–1976), newspaper editor (Algemeen Handelsblad), diplomat
- Johan Hendrik Christiaan Basting (1817–1870), army doctor and promotor founding of the Red Cross
- Diederik Jacobus den Beer Poortugael (1800–1879), officer (Military William Order), poet
- Eduard Willem Bischoff van Heemskerck (1850–1934), colonel (Military William Order)
- Willem Frederik Karel Bischoff van Heemskerck (1852–1915), general-major
- Ferdinand Bordewijk (1884–1965), writer
- Johan Jacob Boreel (1869–1934), lieutenant-colonel (Military William Order)
- Christiaan ten Bosch (1840–1924), vice admiral
- Pieter Brijnen van Houten (1907–1991), spy
- Herman Brockmann (1871–1936), rower
- Pieter Cornelis Boutens (1870–1943), poet
- Menno ter Braak (1902–1940), writer
- Louis Christiaan van den Brandeler (1855–1911), general-major, governor of the Koninklijke Militaire Academie
- Klaas Buchly (1910–1965), Dutch track cyclist
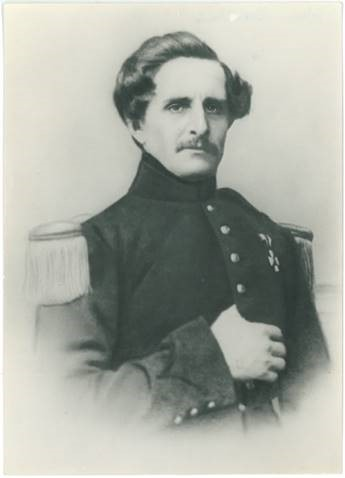
J.H.C. Basting

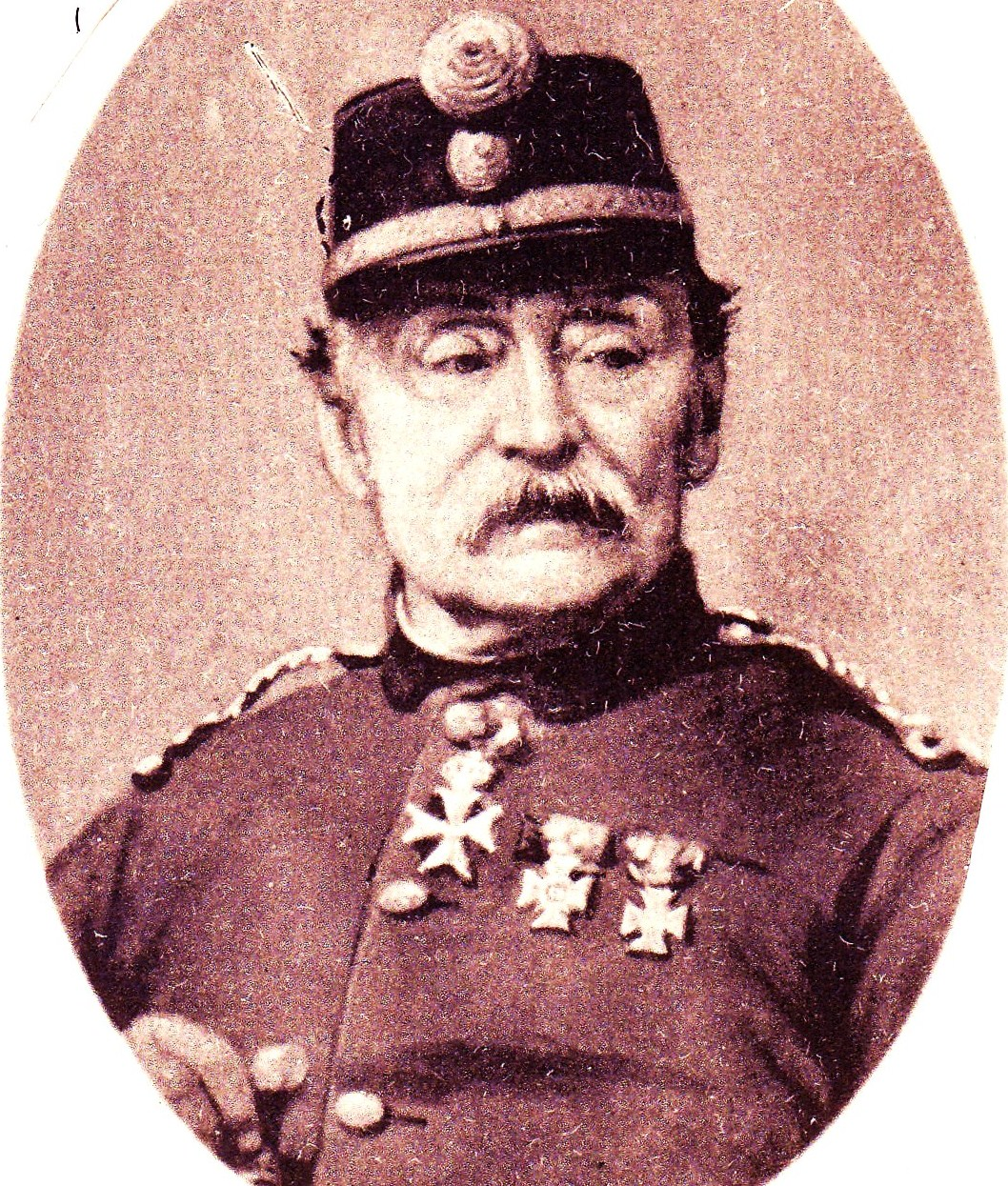
D.J. den Beer Poortugael

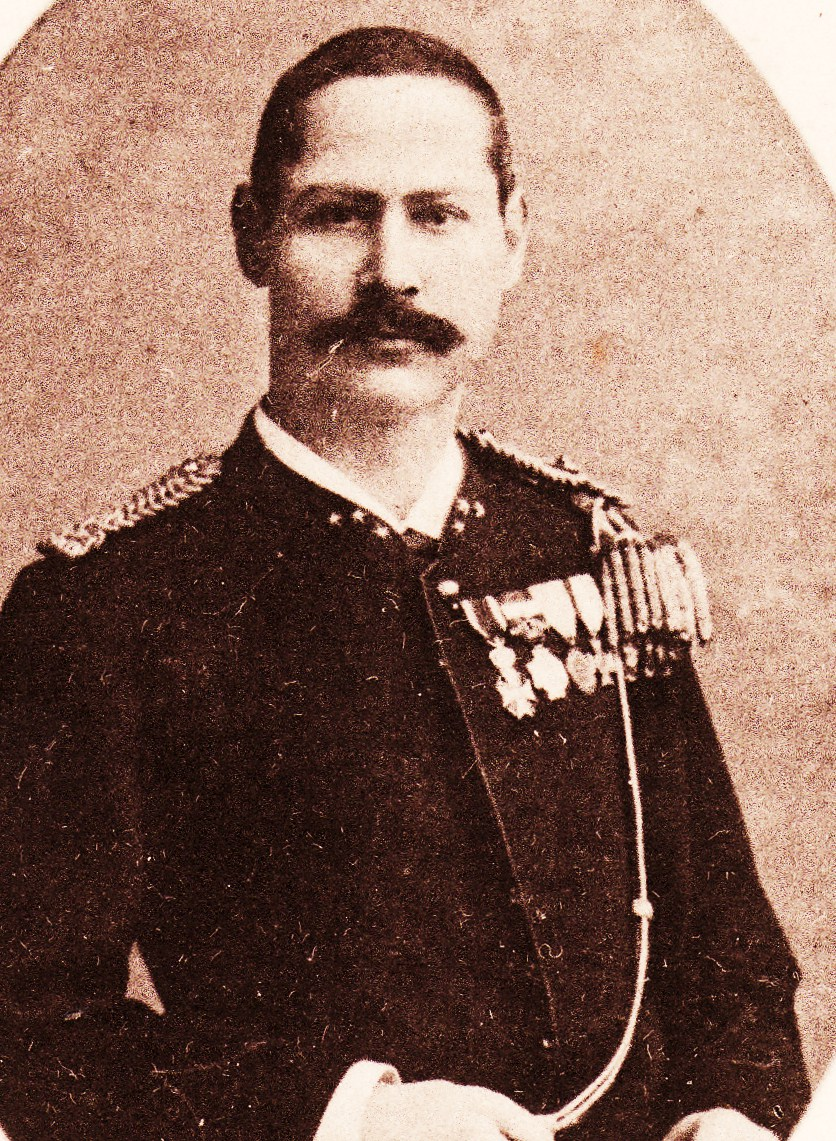
E.W. Bischoff van Heemskerck

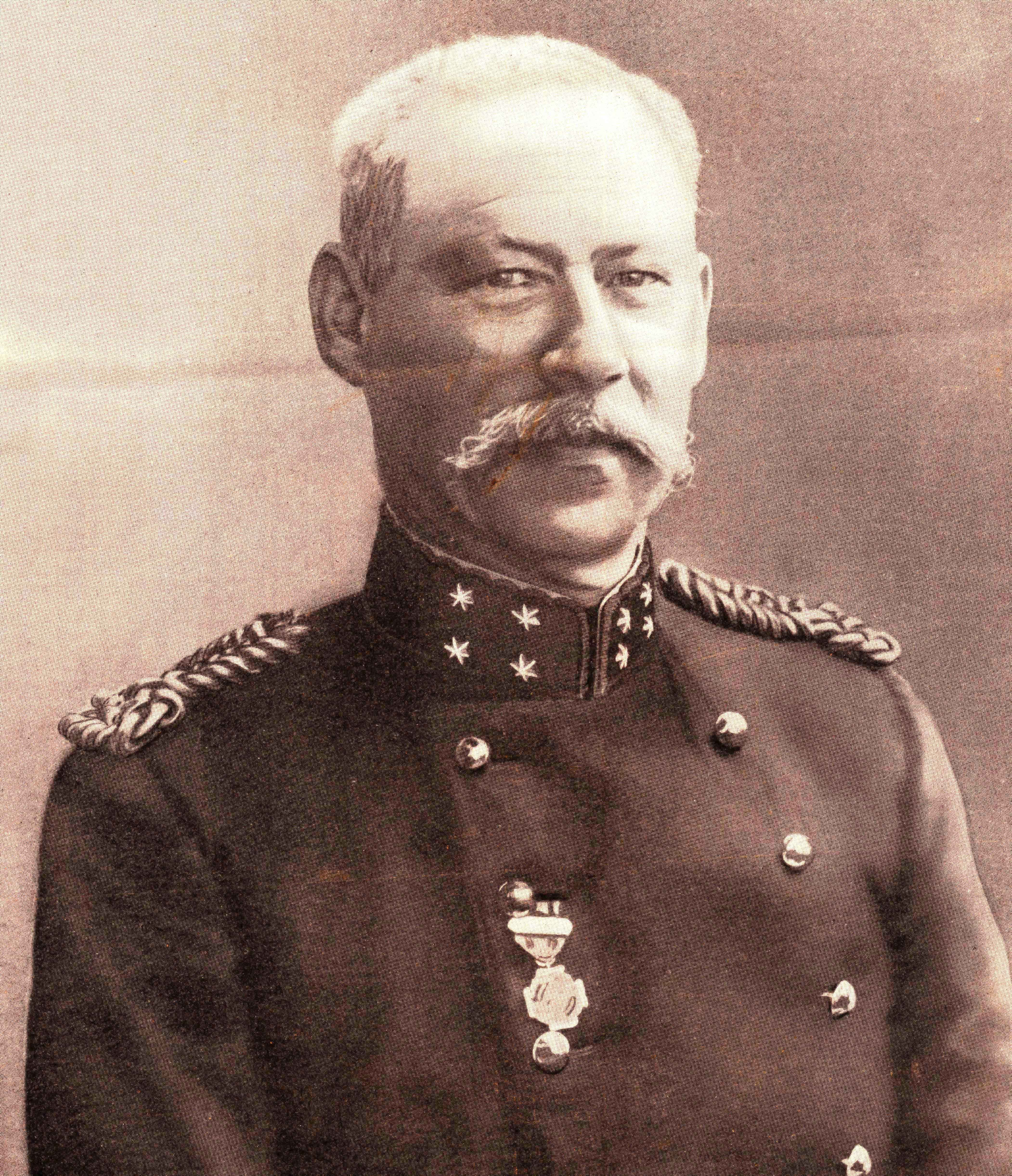
W.F.K. Bischoff van Heemskerck

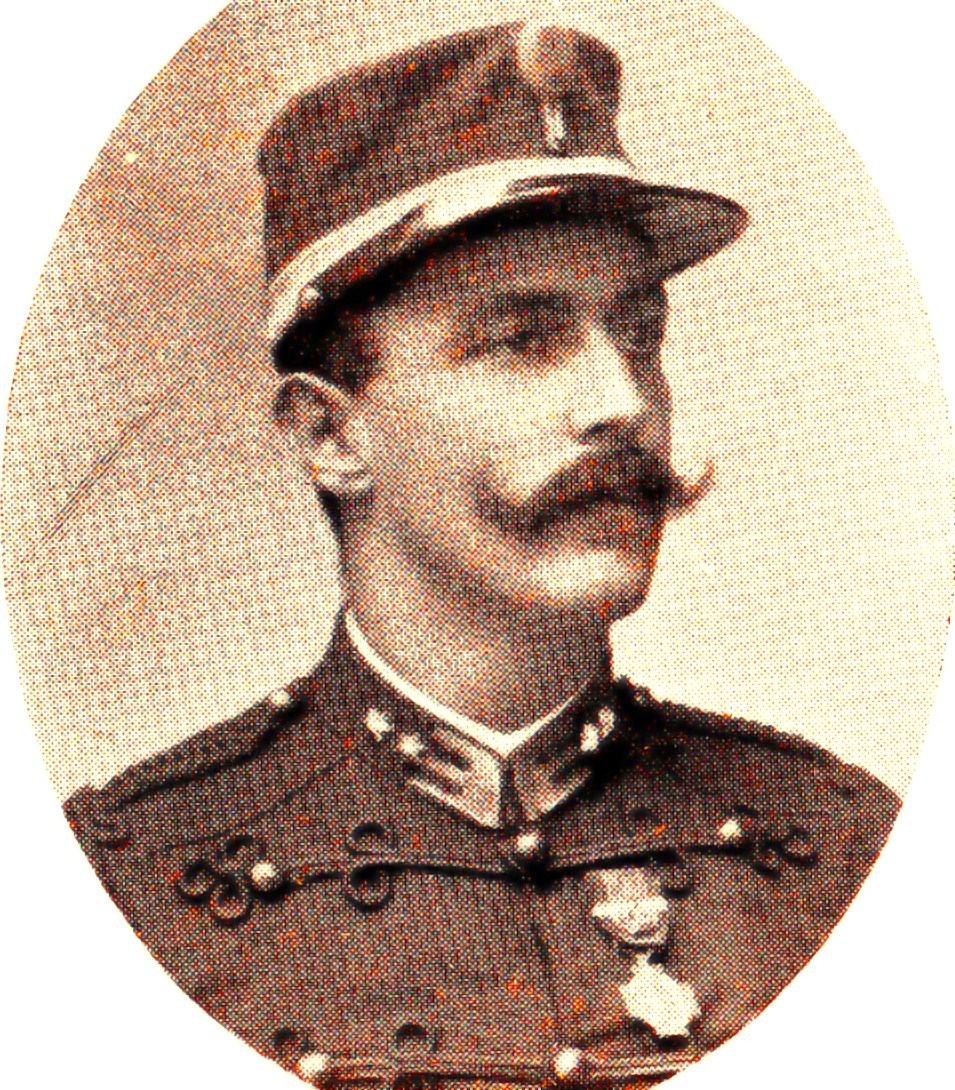
J.J. Boreel

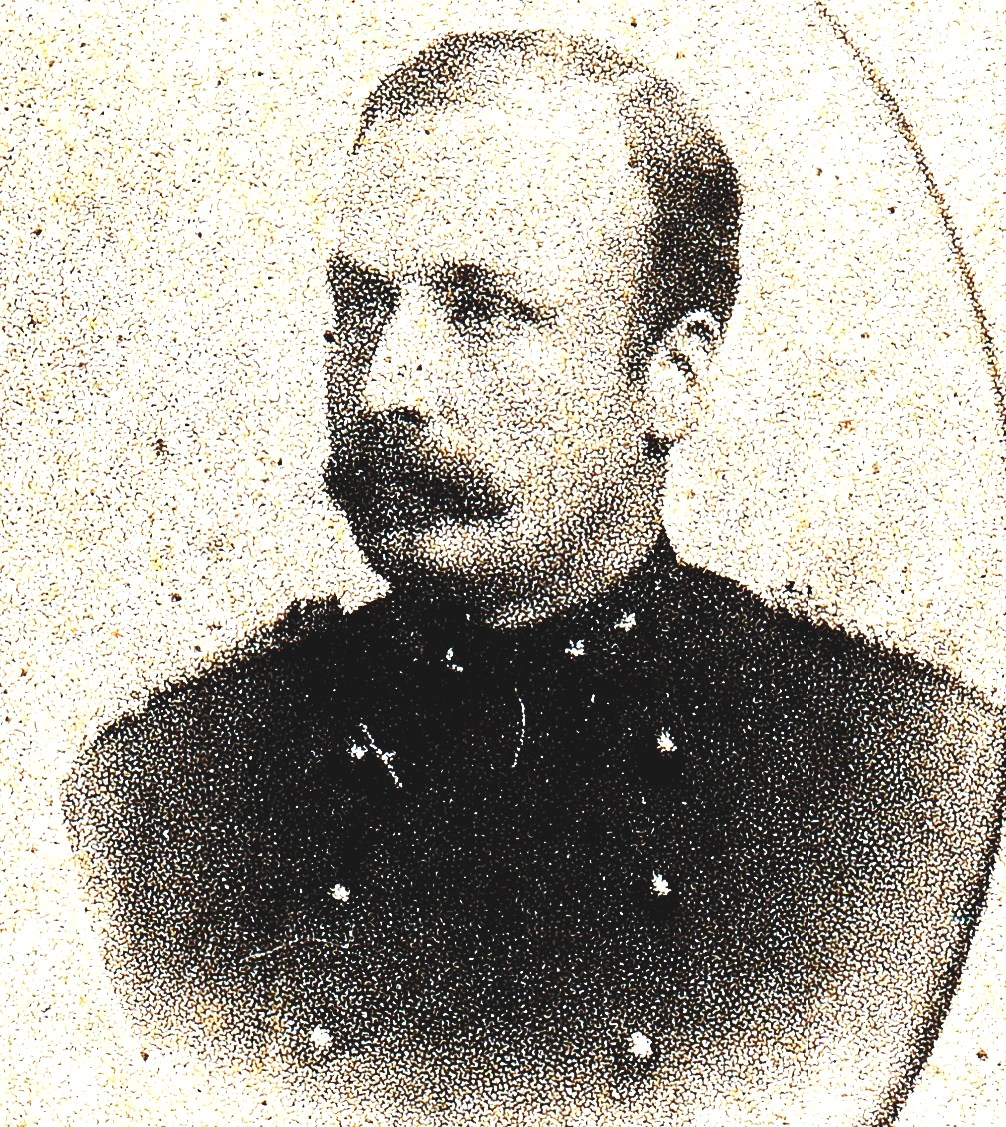
L.C. van den Brandeler

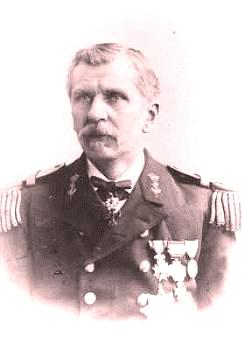
Chr. ten Bosch

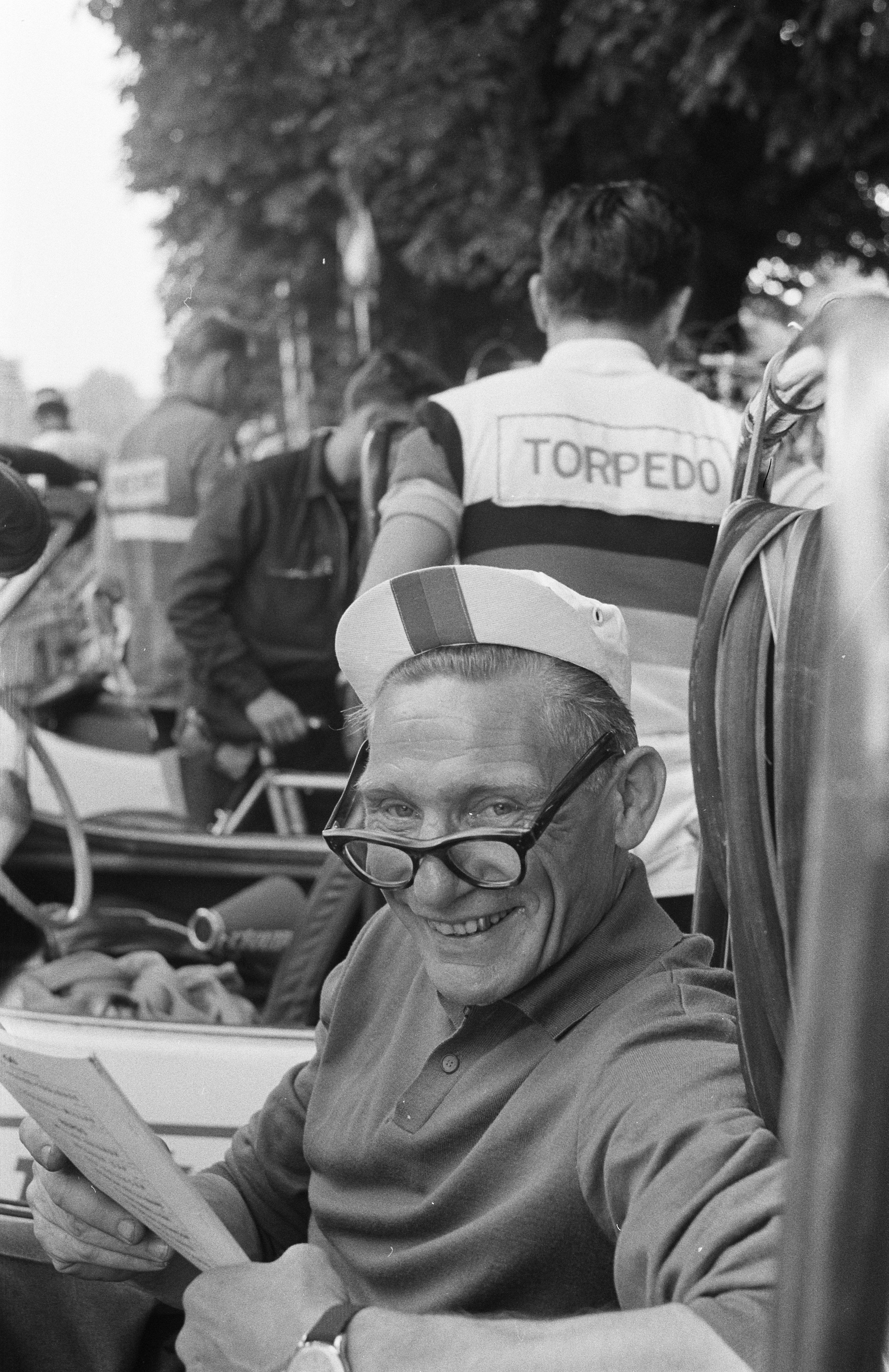
N. Buchly

== C ==
- John Malcolm Campbell (1845–1928), lieutenant general
- Eduard Willem van der Capellen (1863–1935), major general
- François de Casembroot (1817–1895), vice admiral, (Military William Order)
- Jan Frans Adolf Coertzen (1801–1863), schout-bij-nacht, (Military William Order)
- Wouter Cool (1848–1928), lieutenant general, Minister of War
- Jean Henri Coronel (1846–1934), adjudant-onderofficier, (Military William Order)
- Pieter Cort van der Linden (1846–1935), politician
- Louis Couperus (as) (1863–1923), writer
- Elisabeth Couperus-Baud (as) (1867–1960), writer and translator
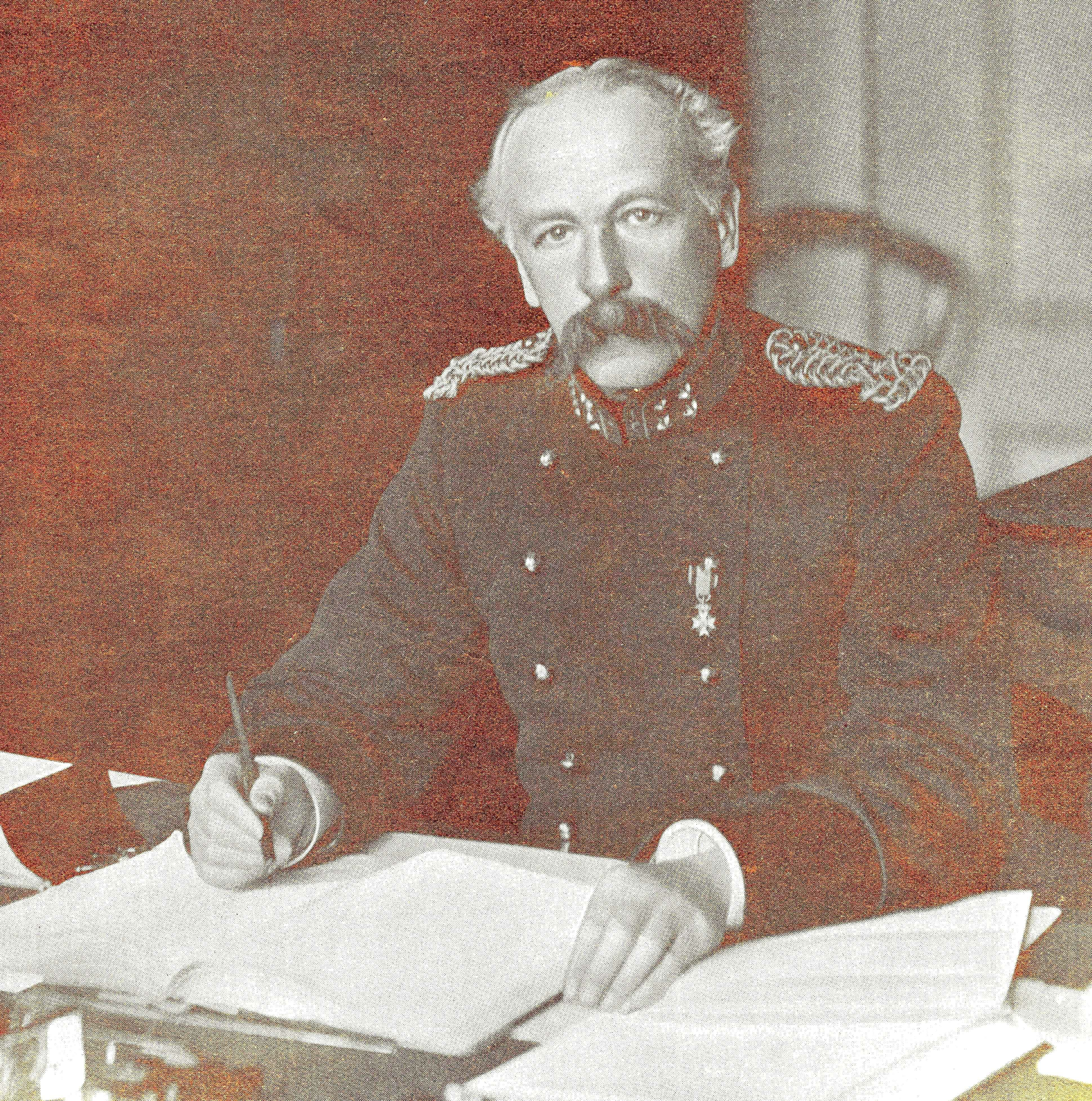
J.M. Campbell

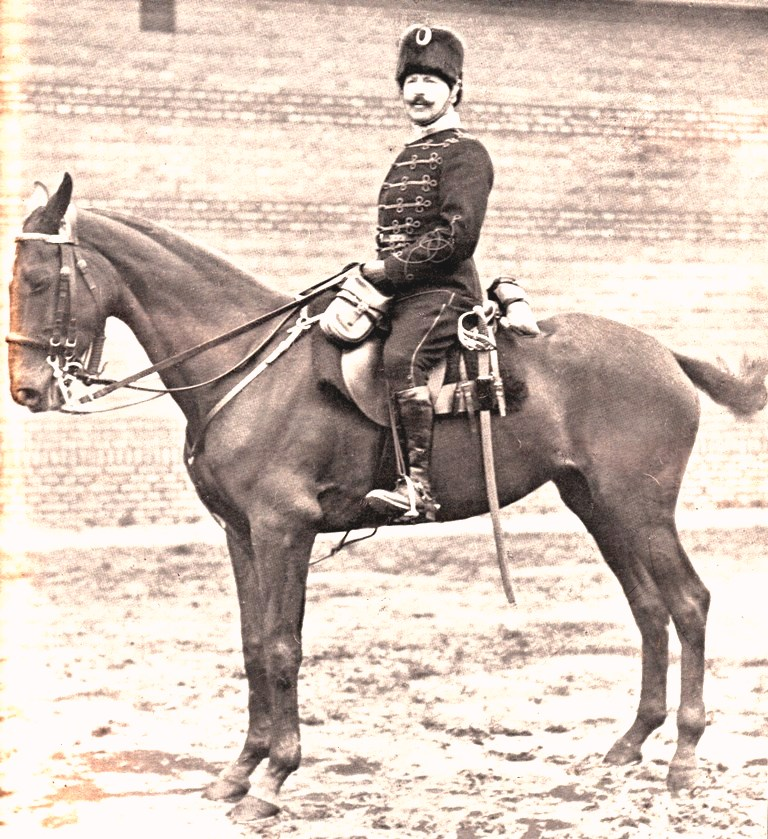
E.W. van der Capellen

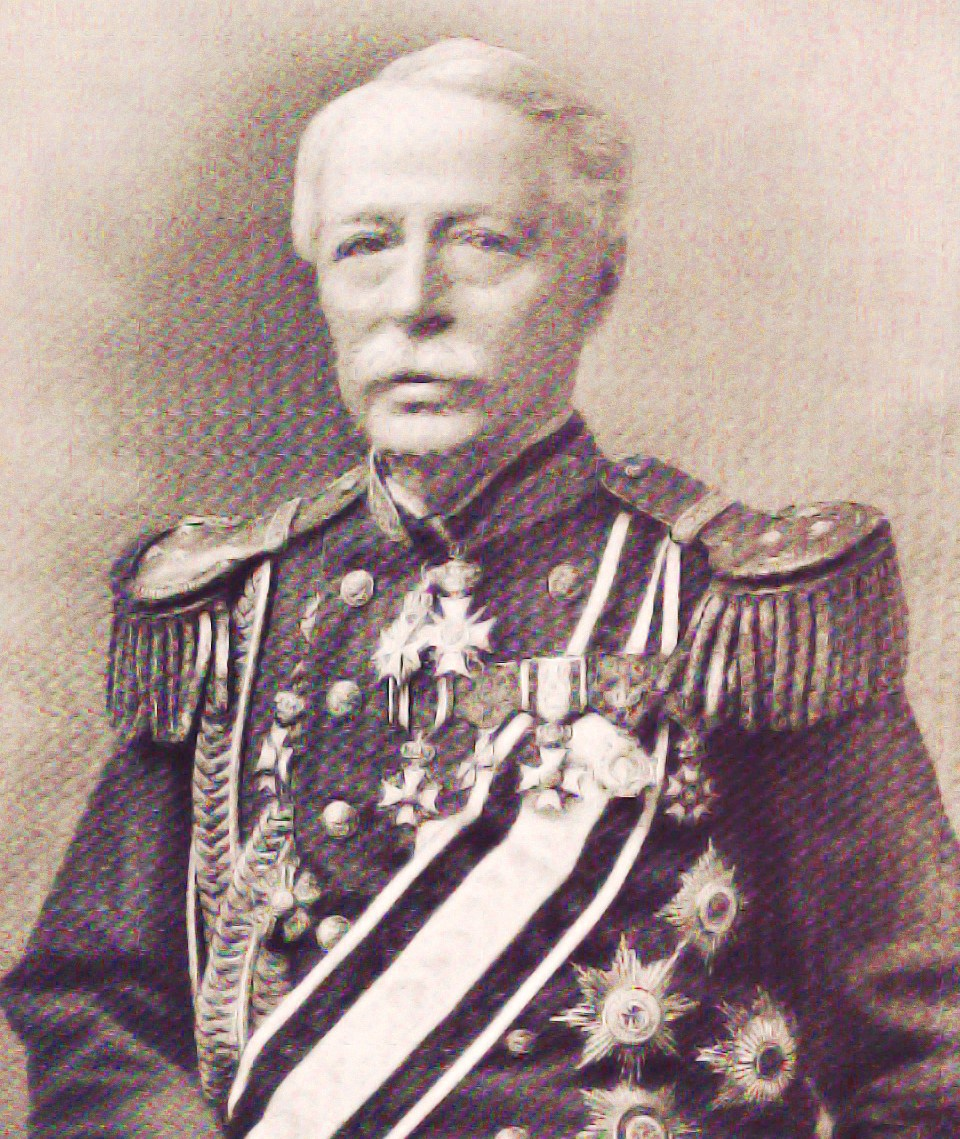
F. de Casembroot

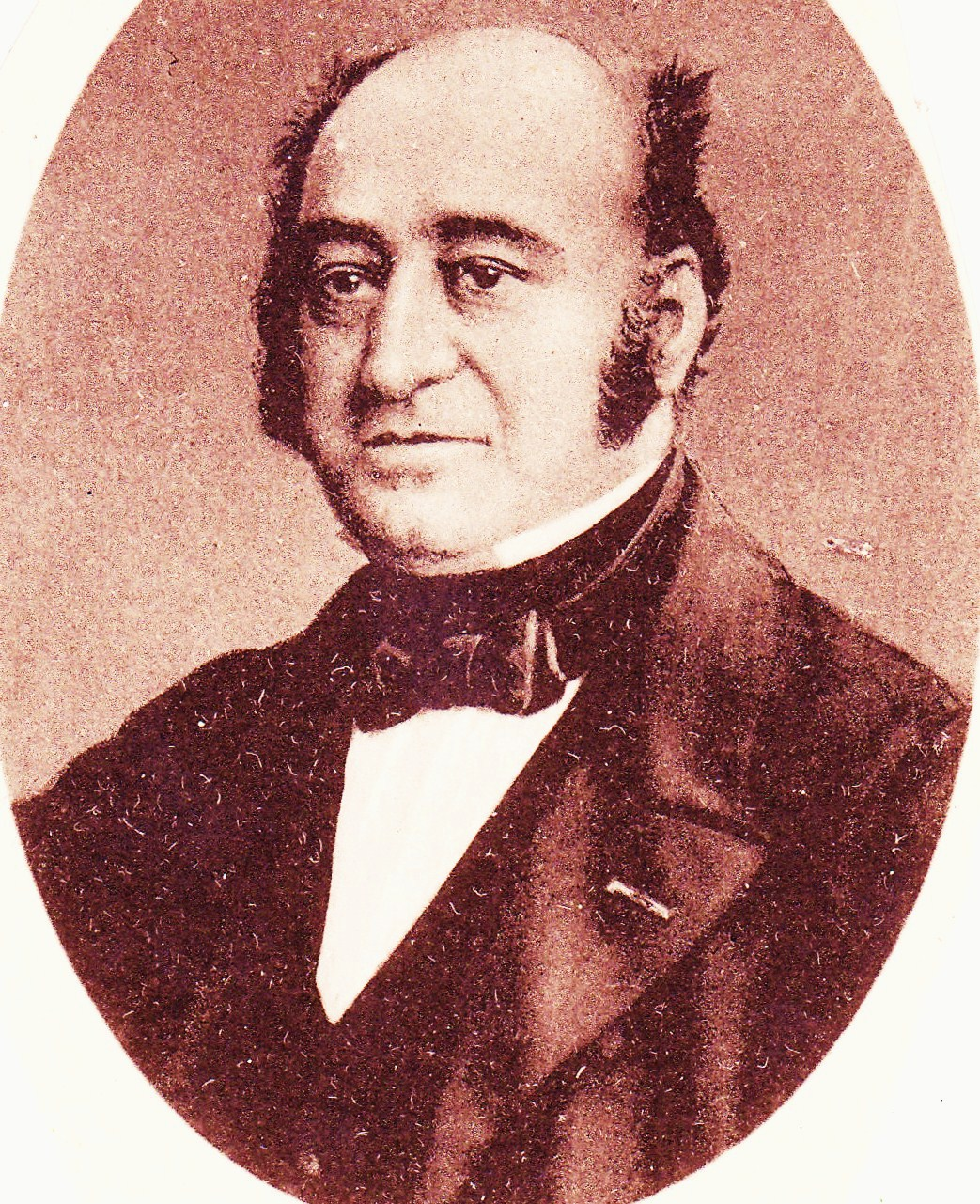
J.F. Adolf Coertzen

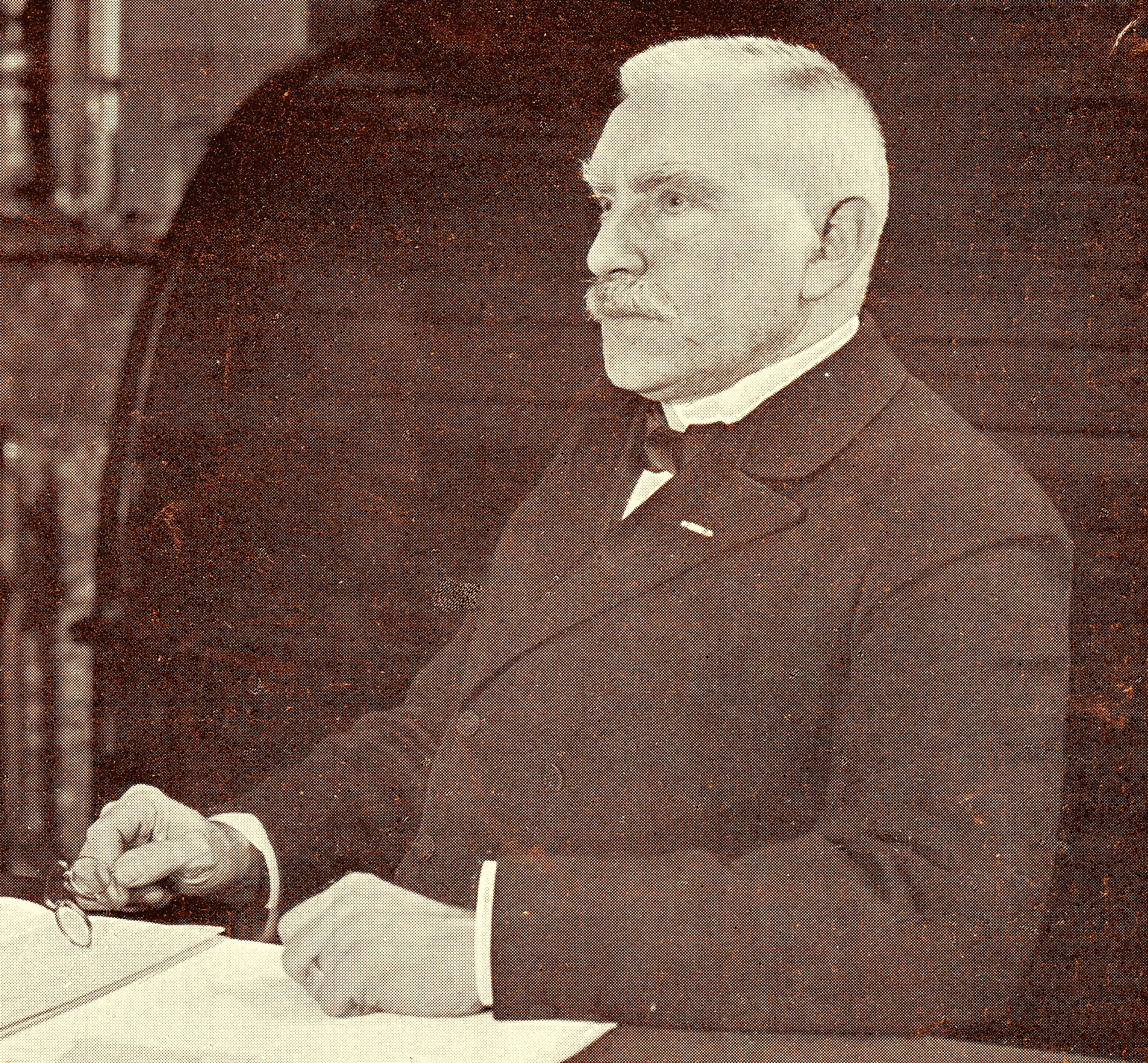
W. Cool

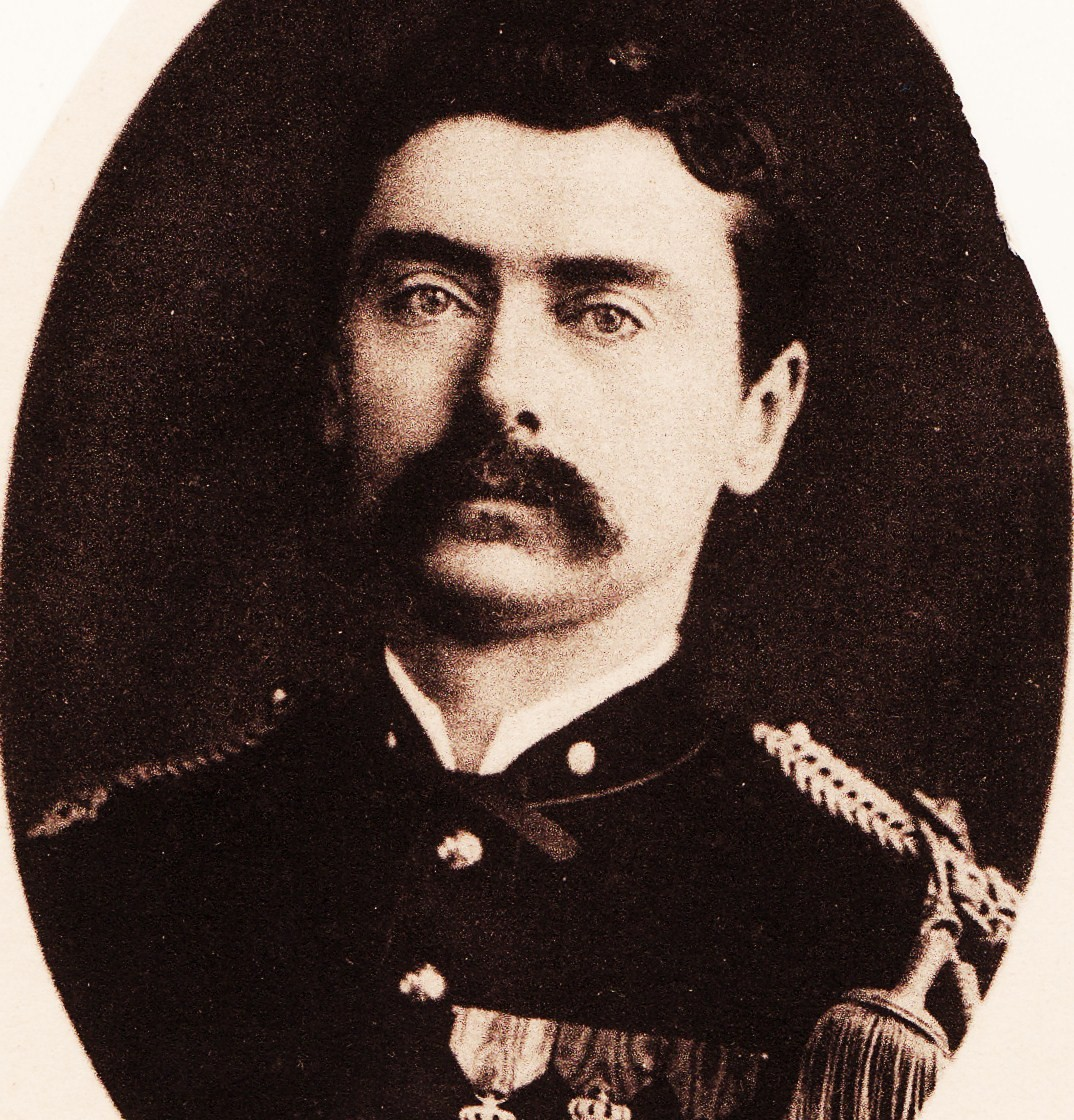
J.H. Coronel

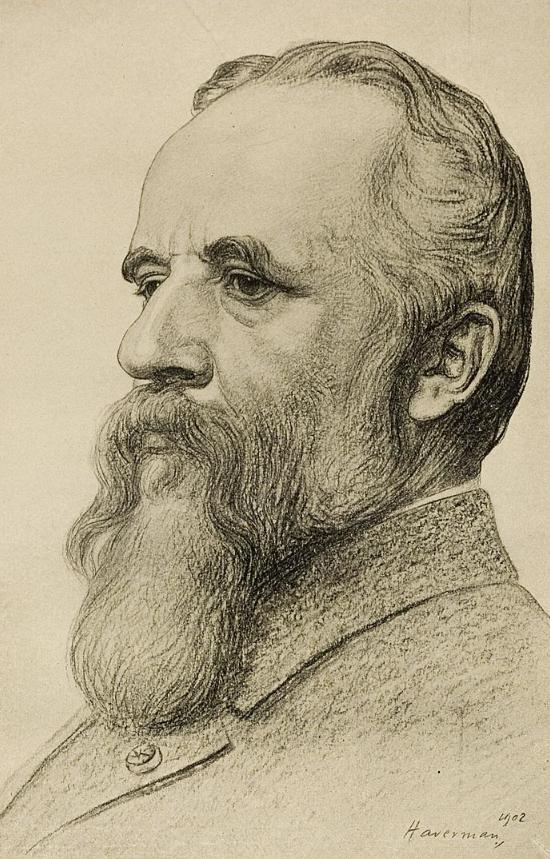
P. Cort van der Linden

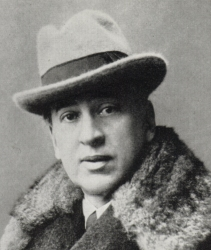
L.M.A. Couperus

== D ==
- Willy Derby (1886–1944), singer
- Franz Deutmann (1867–1915), painter
- Herman Deutmann (1870–1926), royal photographer
- Karel Hugo van Diepenbrugge (1817–1889), general-major, inspecteur der artillerie
- Johan Hendrik Doeleman (1848–1913), artist
- Willem Hendrik Doorman (1799–1873), general (Military William Order)
- Willem Drees (1886–1988), politician
- Toon Dupuis (1877–1937), sculptor
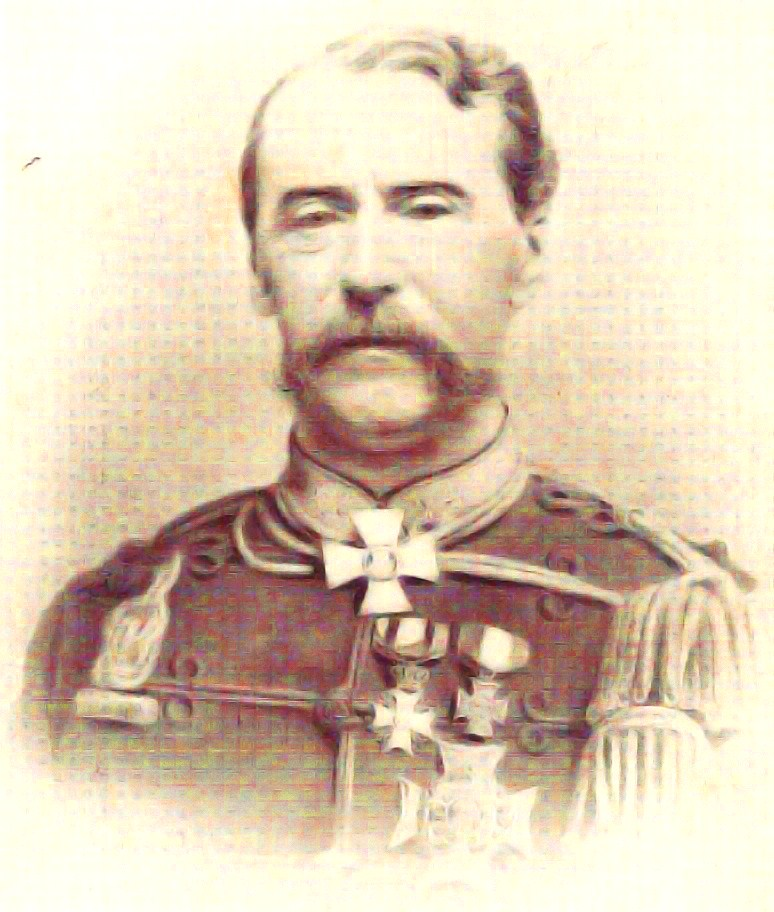
K.H. van Diepenbrugge

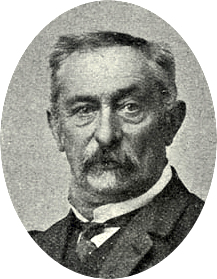
J.H. Doeleman

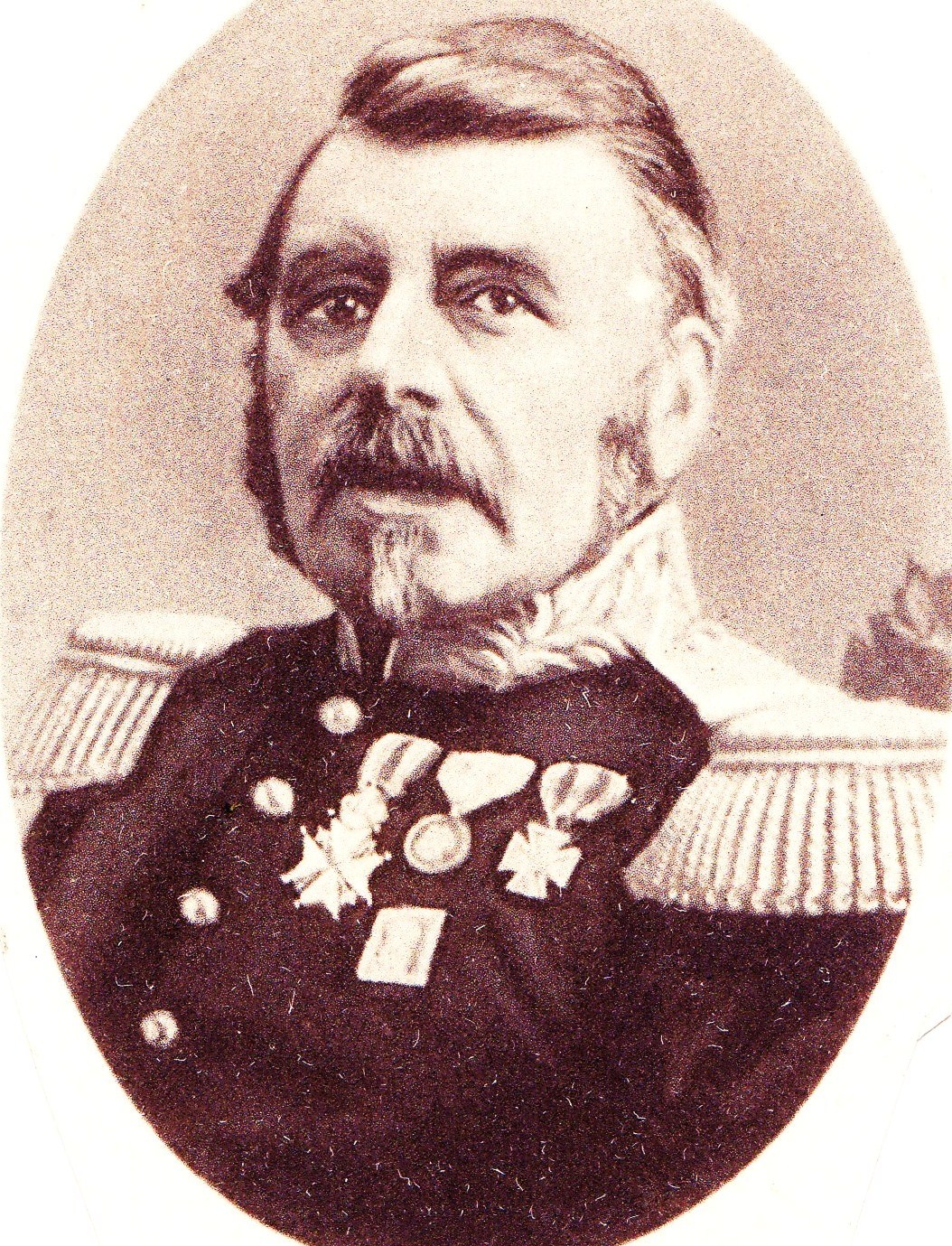
W.H. Doorman

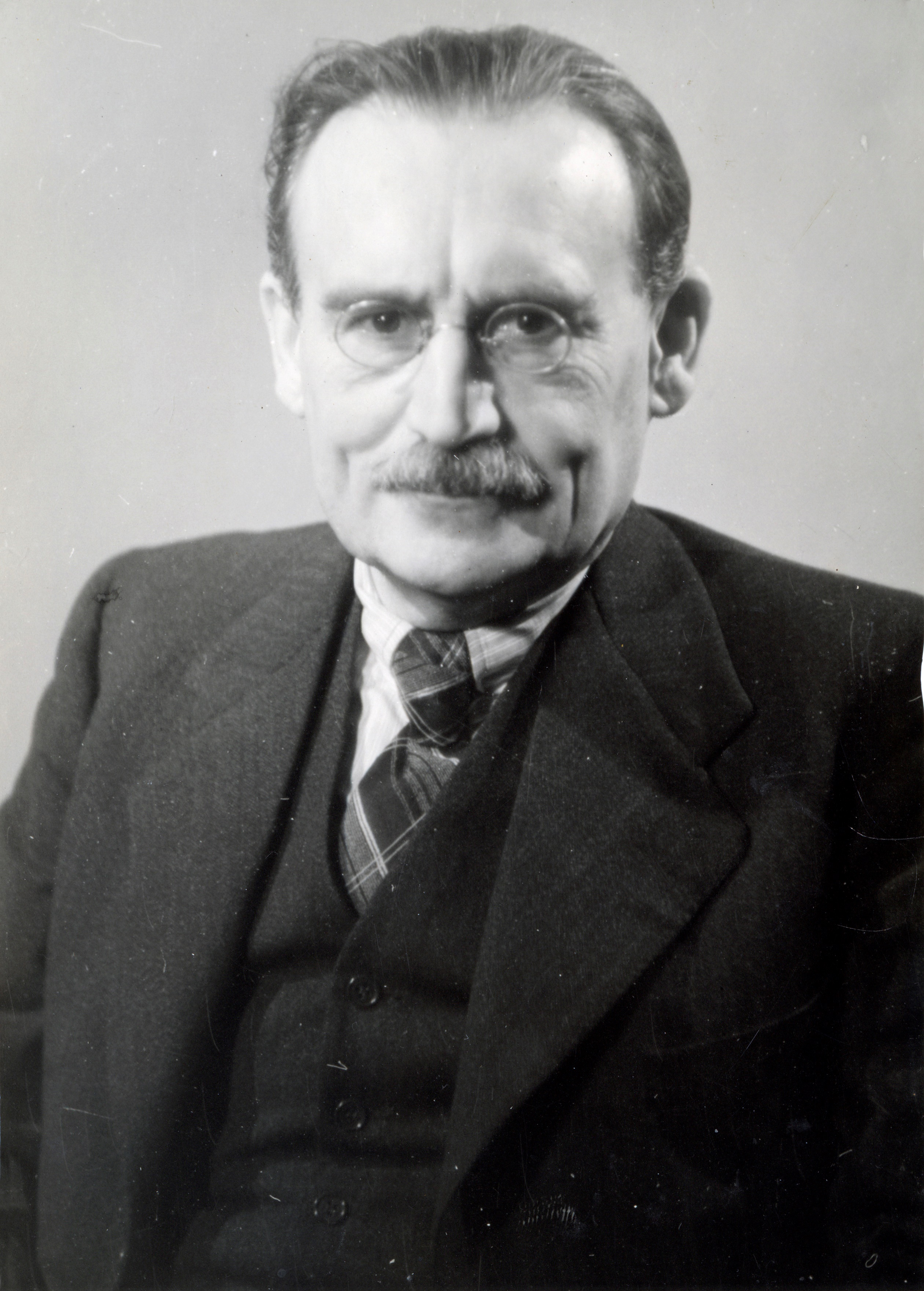
W. Drees

== E ==
- Jacob Nicolaes Everts (1785–1846), lieutenant general (Military William Order)
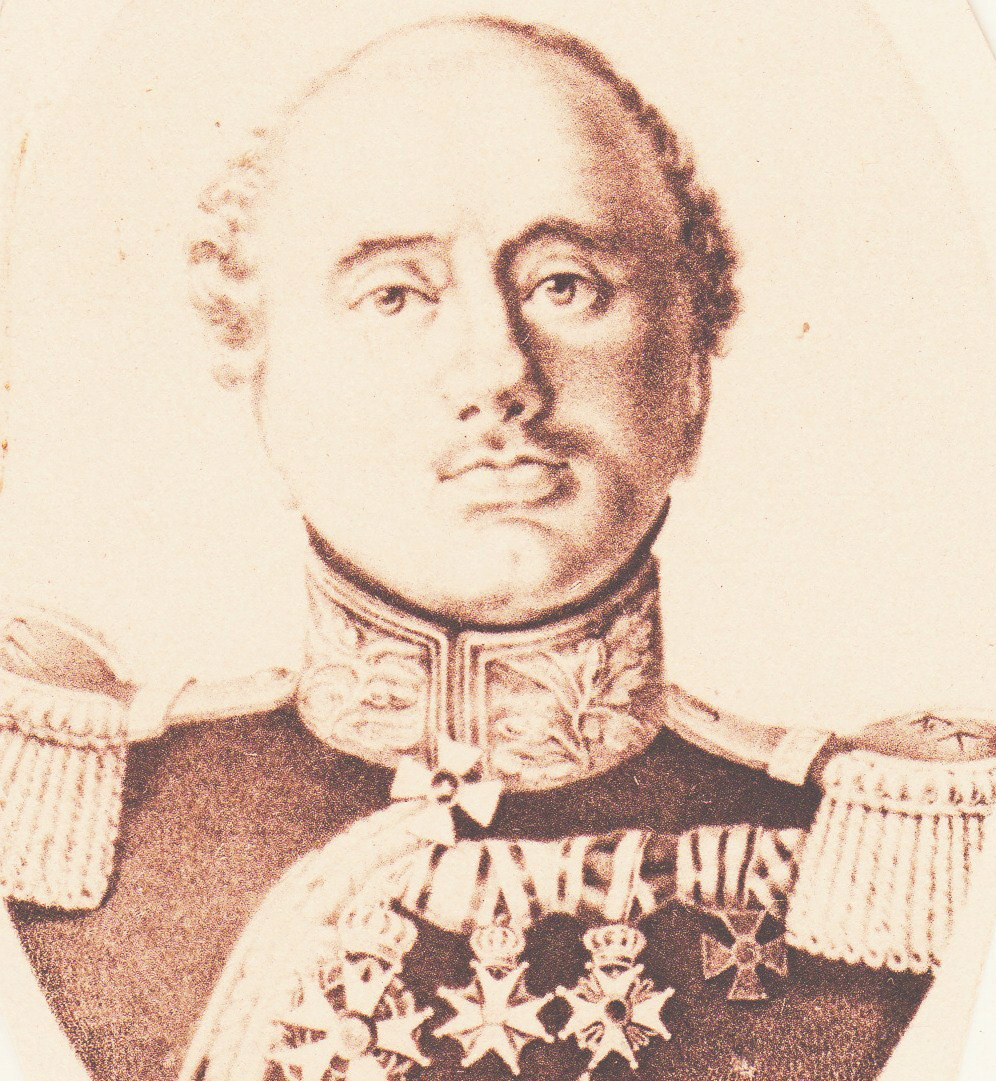
J.N. Everts

== F ==
- Isaäc Dignus Fransen van de Putte (1822–1902), Minister of Colonial Affairs
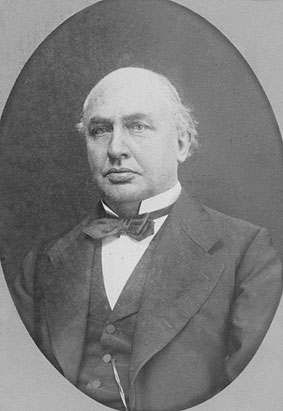
I.D. Fransen van de Putte

== G ==
- Willem Karel van Gennep (1823–1900), vice admiral (Military William Order)
- Neville Davison Goldsmid (1814–1875), industrialist, art collector
- Jan de Graan (1852–1874), violinist
- Dirk de Graeff van Polsbroek (1833–1916), diplomat in Japan
- Walter Robert de Greve (1864–1924), commander Royal Netherlands East Indies Army (Military William Order)
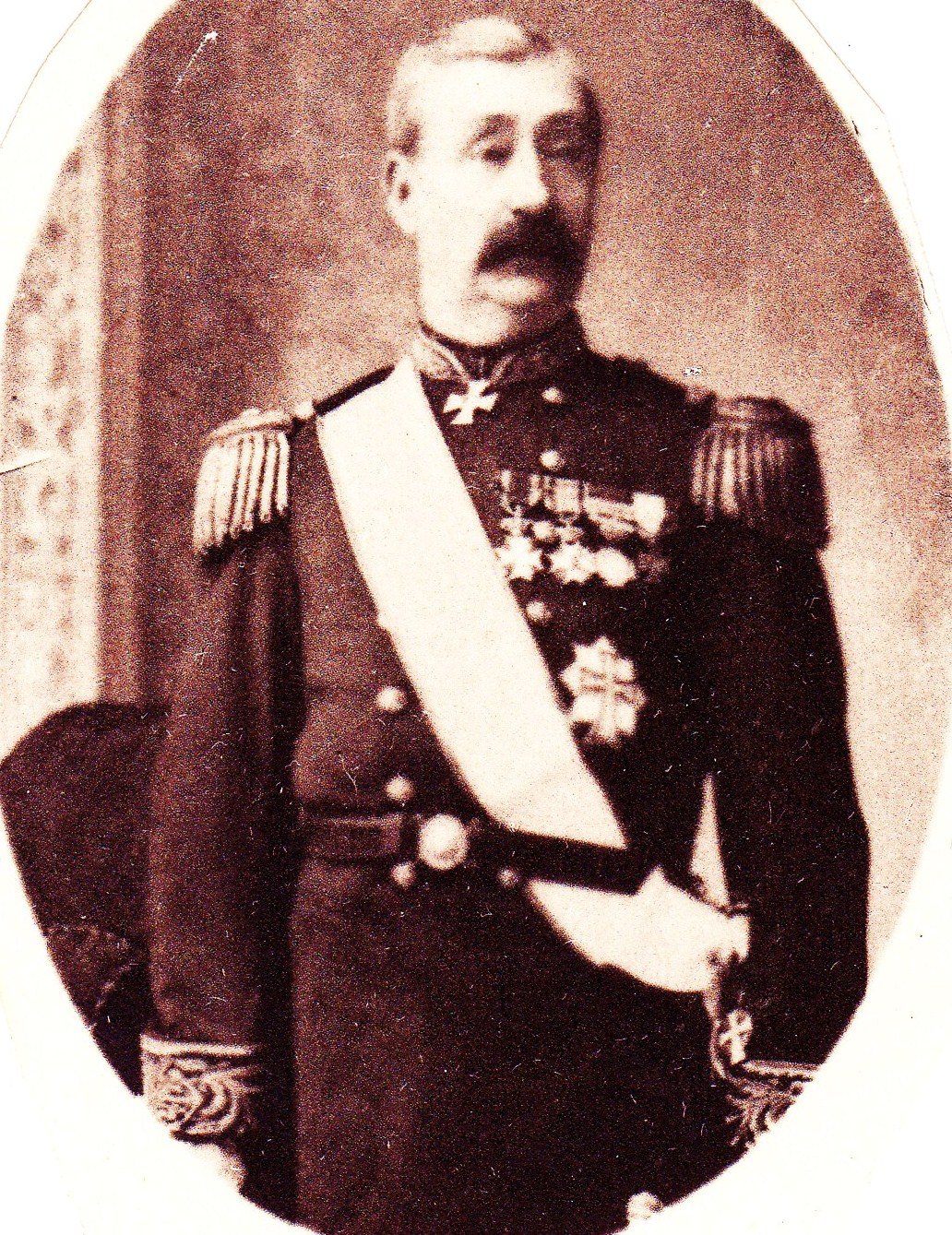
W.K. van Gennep

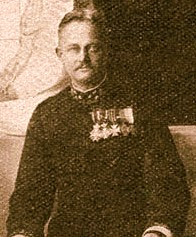
W.R. de Greve

== H ==
- Panthaleon Emile Hajenius (1874–1939), colonel (Military William Order)
- Hendrik Hamakers (1834–1916), major, (Military William Order)
- Jacobus Diderik Jan van der Hegge Spies (1830–1895), kapitein-ter-zee (Military William Order)
- Hans Hirschfeld (1899–1961), economist
- Carel Hendrik Hoedt (1862–1932), captain Royal Netherlands East Indies Army (Military William Order)
- Samuel van Houten (1837–1930), Minister of the Interior
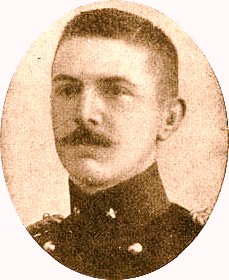
P.E. Hajenius

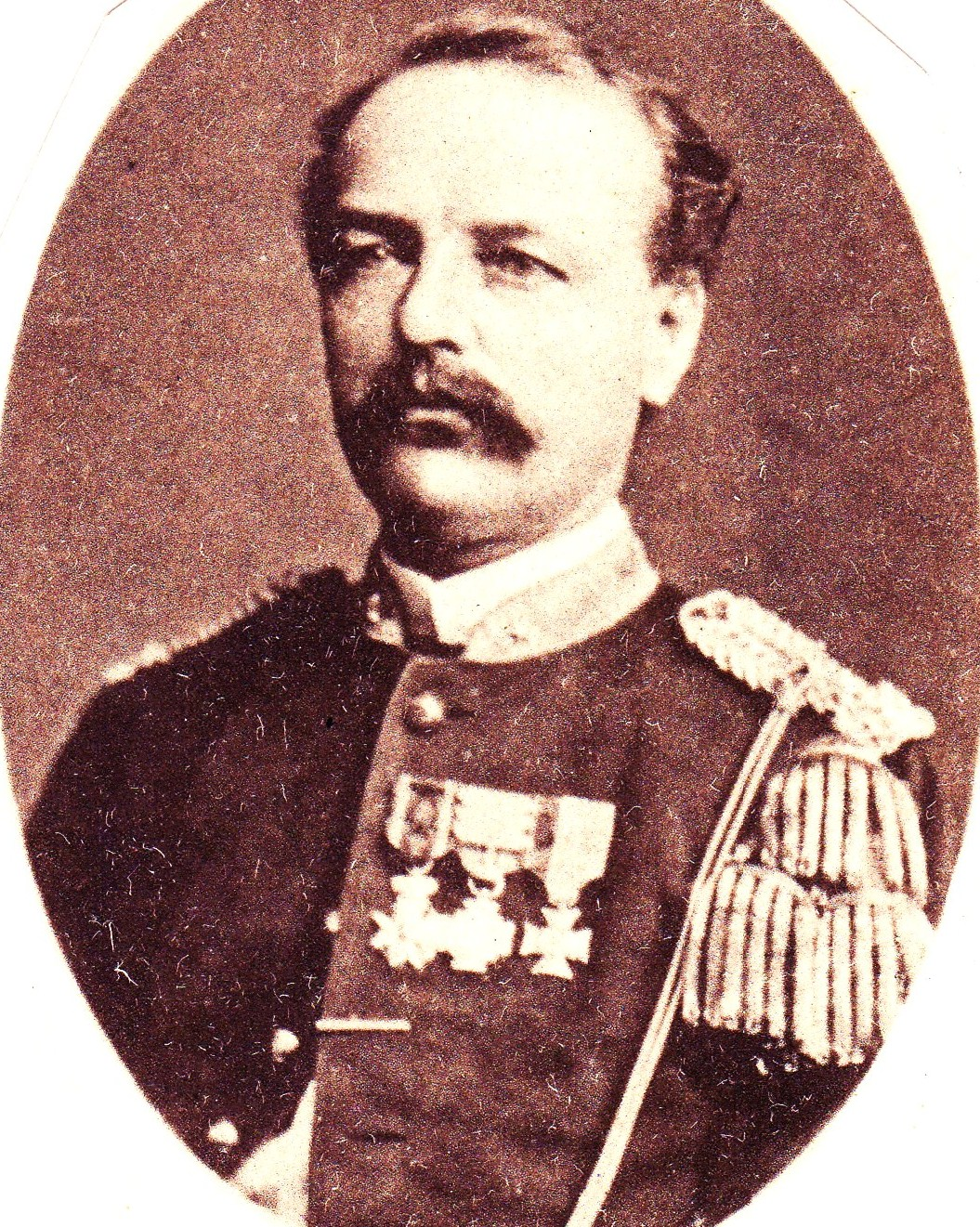
H. Hamakers

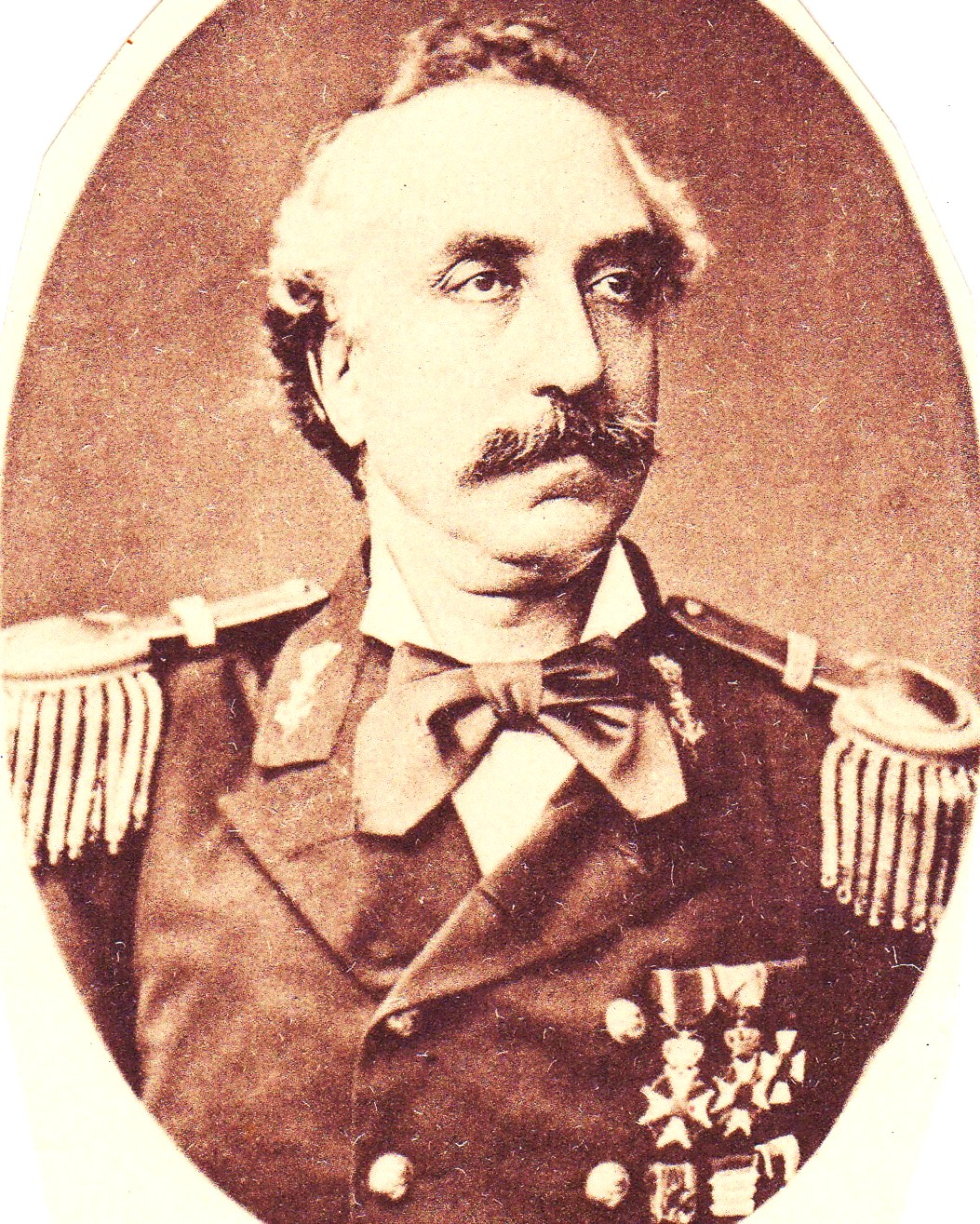
J.D.J. van der Hegge Spies

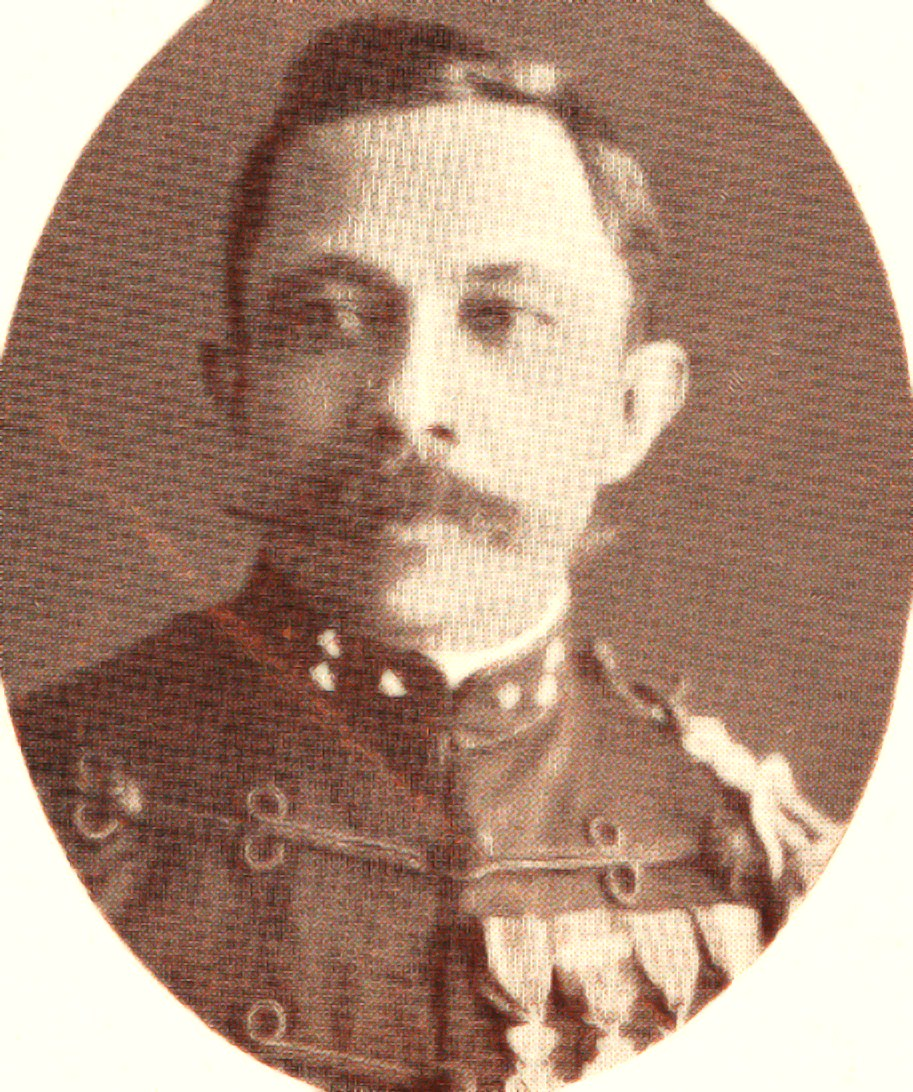
C.H. Hoedt

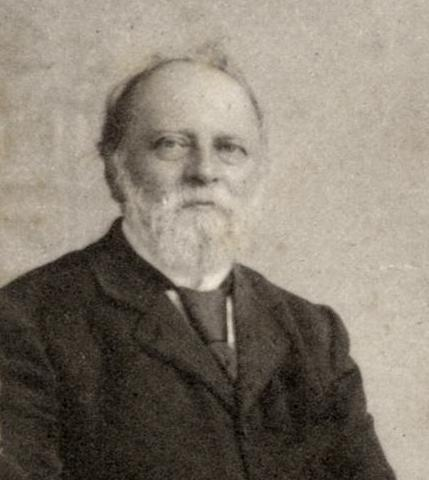
S. van Houten

== I ==
- Ernst Franz Insinger (1870–1930), lieutenant general
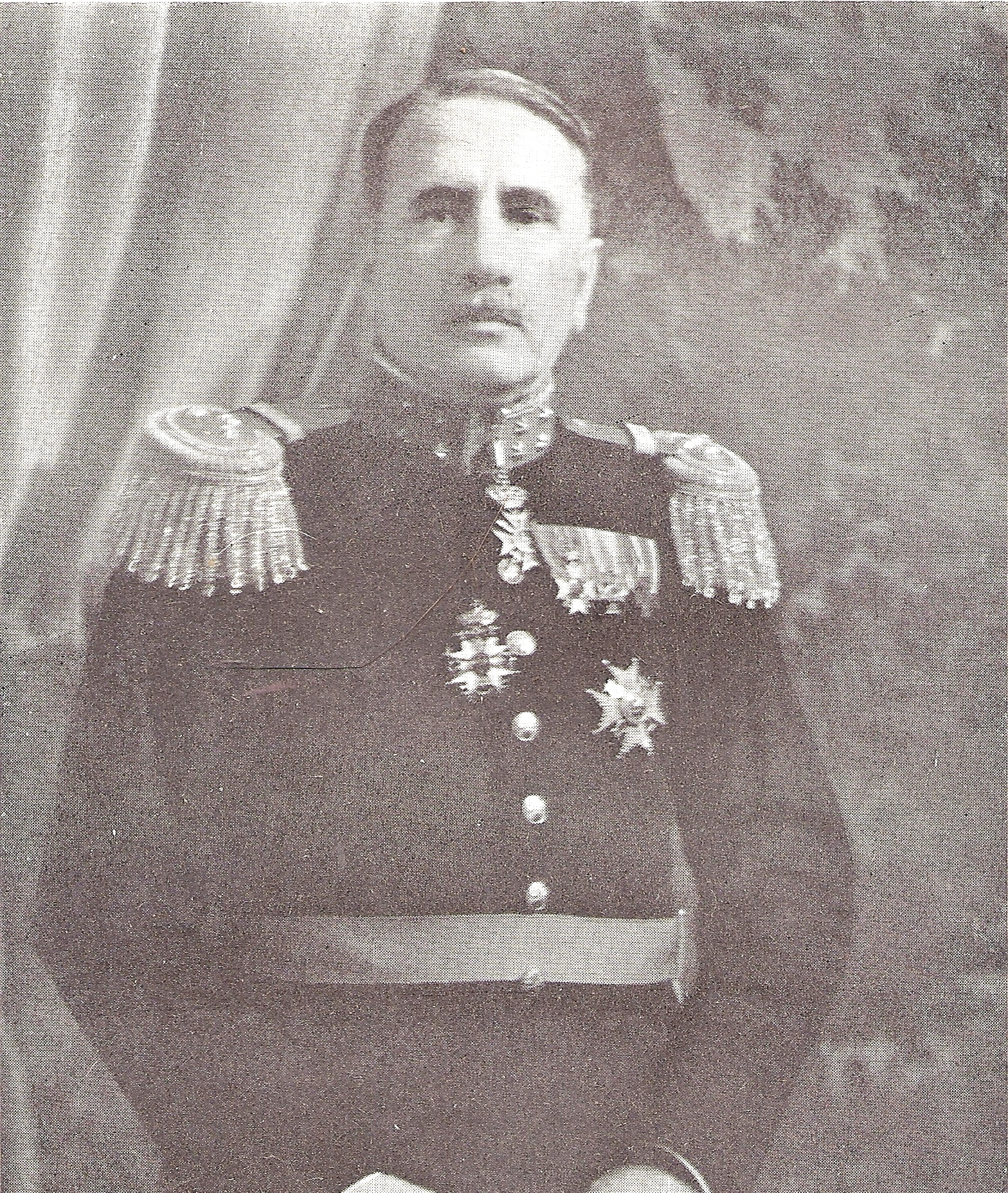
E.F. Insinger

== J ==
- Gerrit Jäger (1863–1894), journalist, playwright

== K ==
- Conrad Carel Käyser (1876–1939), vice admiral, explorer and mountaineer
- Rijnholt Antony Klerck (1774–1854), lieutenant general (Military William Order)
- Johan Philip Koelman (1818–1893), painter, sculptor, writer
- Cornelis Eliza van Koetsveld (1807–1893), preacher and writer
- Gijsbertus Johannes van Kooten (1851–1923), lieutenant general (Military William Order)
- Gerhardus Kruys (1838–1902), vice admiral, minister of the Navy (Order of the Netherlands Lion)
- Roelof Kuipers (1855–1922), architect
- Abraham Kuyper (1837–1920), politician, theologian
- Henriëtte Kuyper (1870–1932), writer
- Albert Christian Kruyt (1869–1949), missionary, ethnographer and theologian
- Pyaromir Maheboob Khan (1887–1948), Sufi spiritual leader and musician
- Pir-o-Murshid Mohammad Ali Khan (1881–1958), Sufi spiritual leader and musician
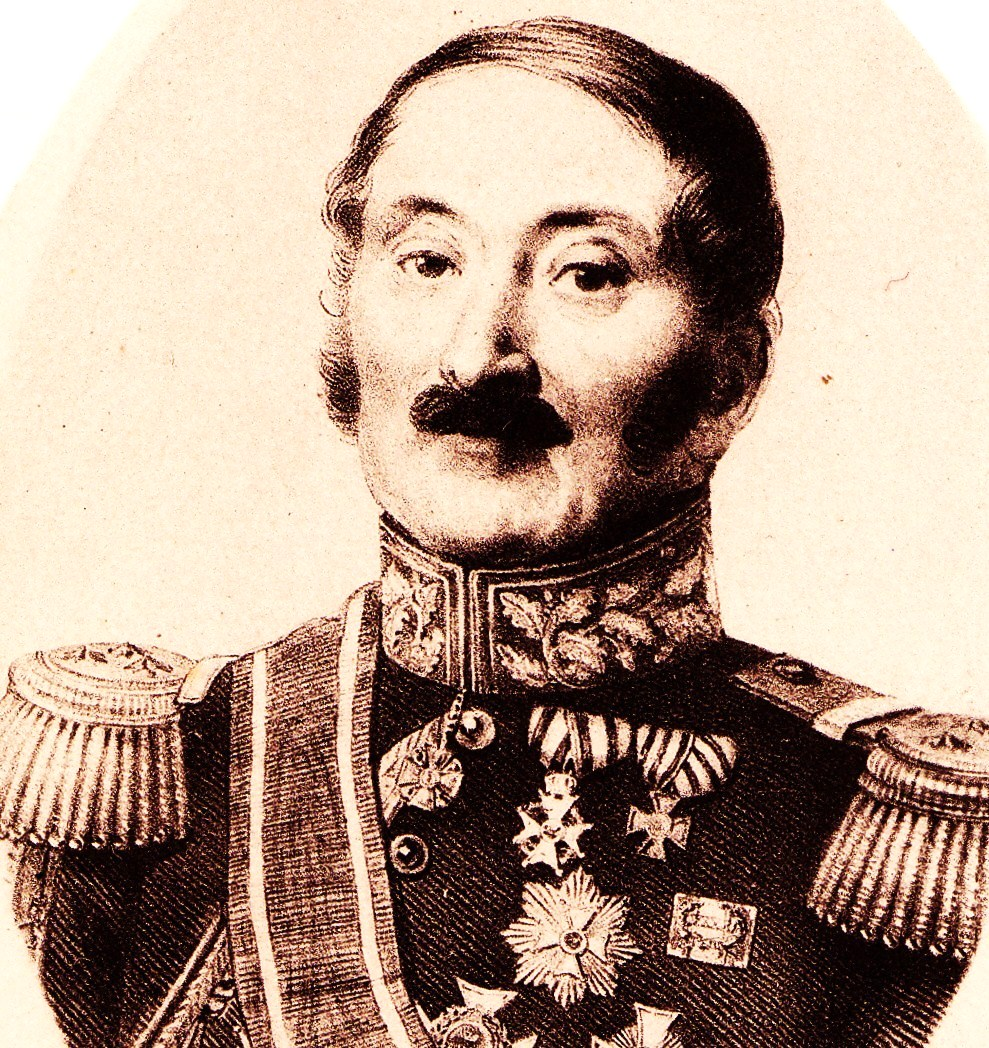
R.A. Klerck

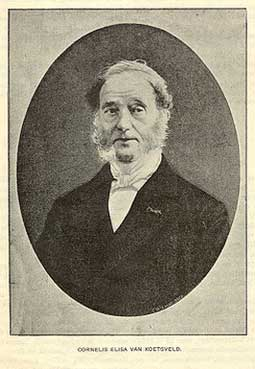
C.E. van Koetsveld

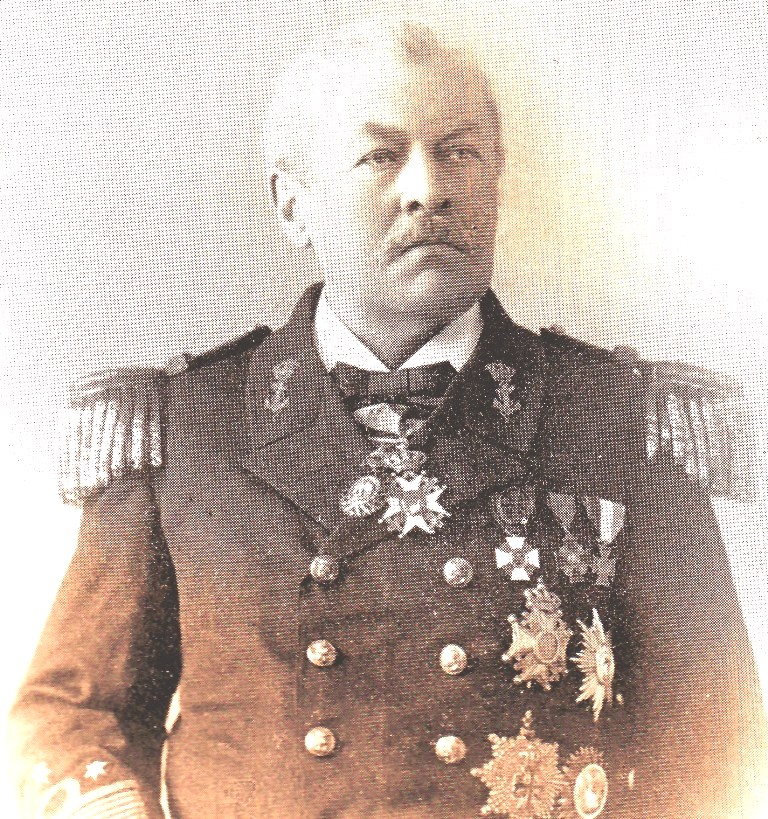
G. Kruys

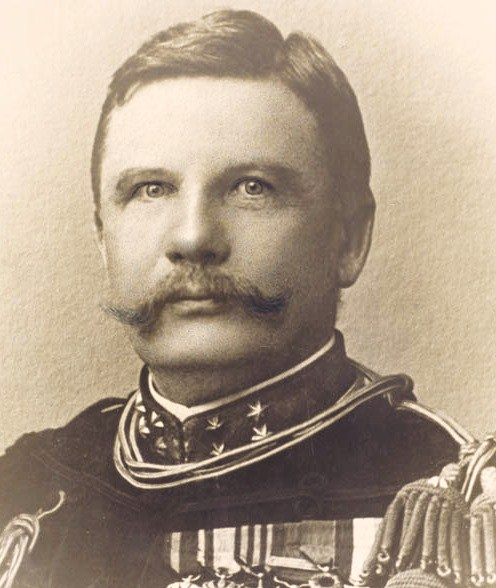
G.J. van Kooten

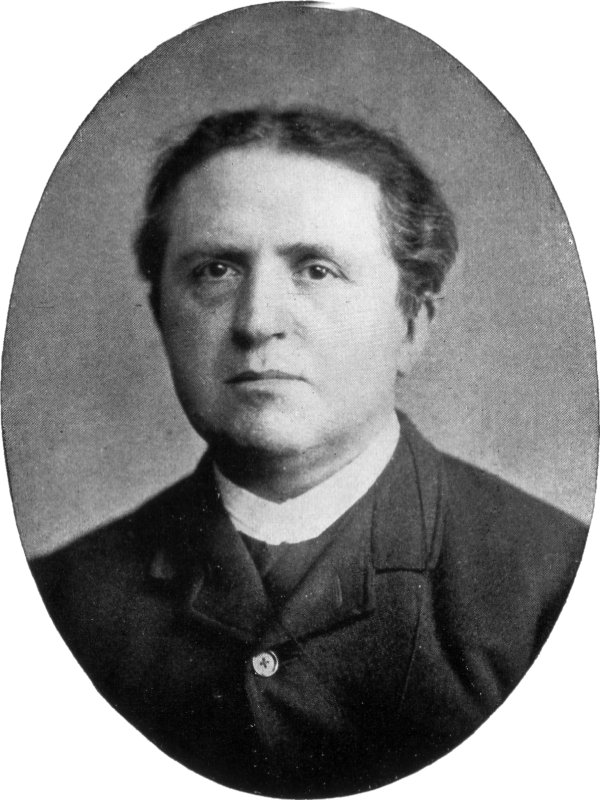
A. Kuyper

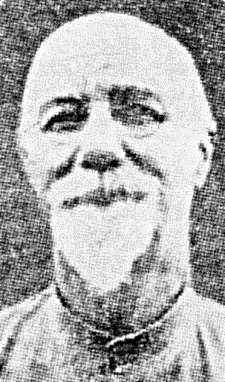
A. C. Kruyt

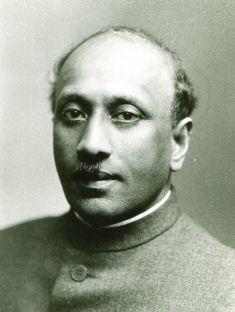
Maheboob Khan

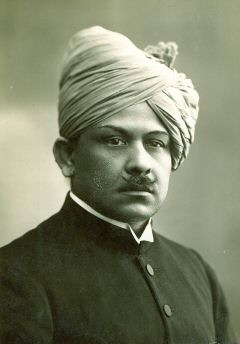
Pir-o-Murshid Ali Khan

== L ==
- Gerardus van der Leeuw (1890–1950), theologian and minister of Education, Arts and Sciences
- Aschwin zur Lippe-Biesterfeld (1914–1988), brother of Prince Bernhard
- Johannes Servaas Lotsy (1808–1863), minister of the Navy and of Colonial Affairs, minister of State
- Pieter Louwerse (1840–1908), writer, poet and schoolmaster
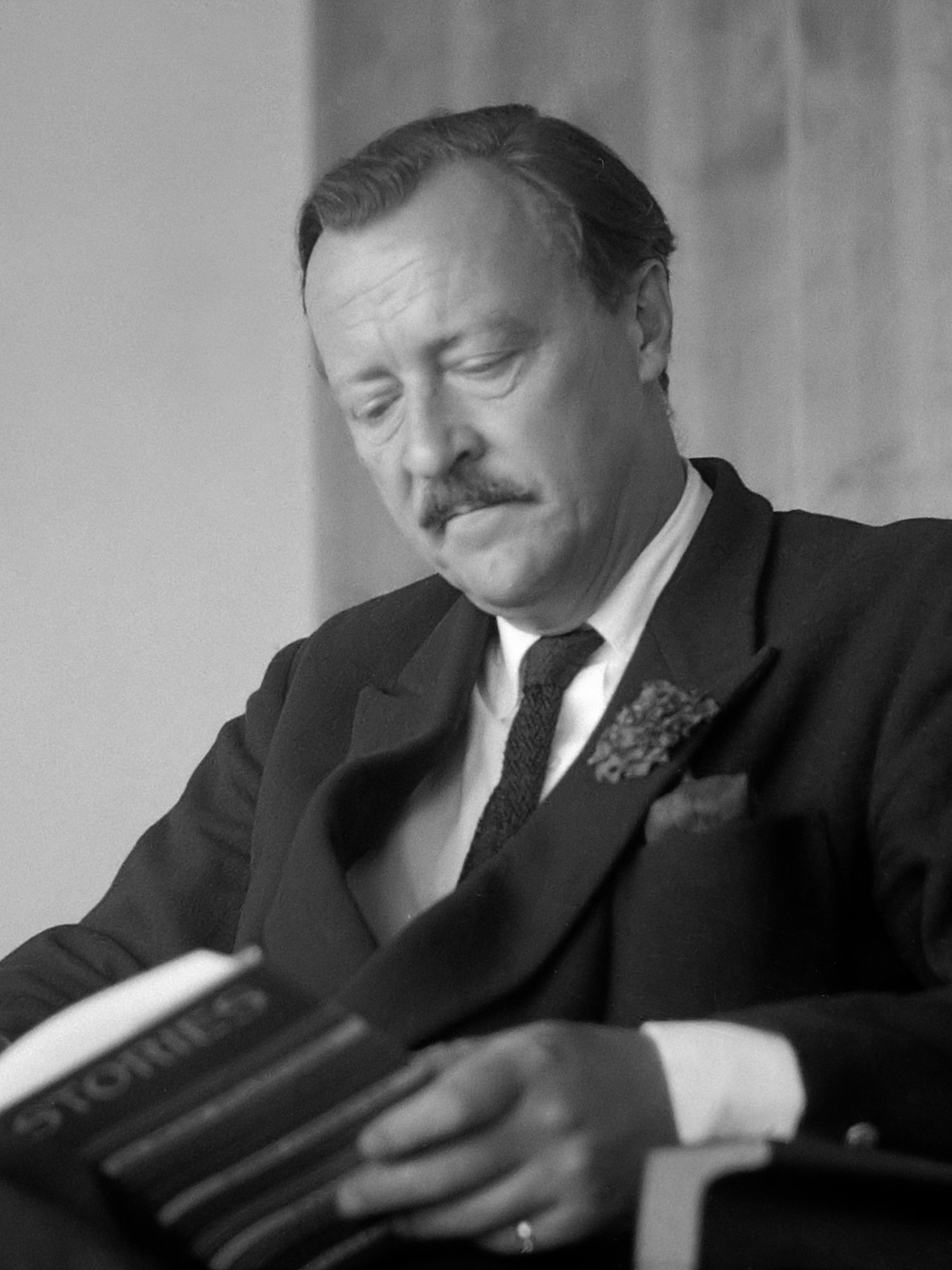
Ashwin zur Lippe-Biesterfeld

== M ==
- Norman MacLeod (1811-1896), lieutenant general
- Johan de Meester (1860-1931), writer, journalist
- Dirk Matak Fontein (1840–1912), officier der gezondheid (Military William Order)
- Hendrik Willem Mesdag (1831–1915), painter
- Sientje Mesdag-van Houten (1834–1909), painter
- Piet Moeskops (1893–1964), cyclist
- Hendrik Pieter Nicolaas Muller (1859–1941), merchant, traveller, diplomat
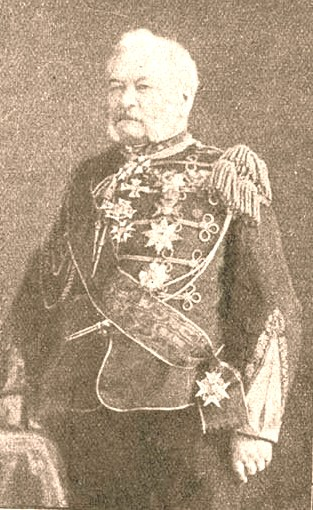
N. MacLeod

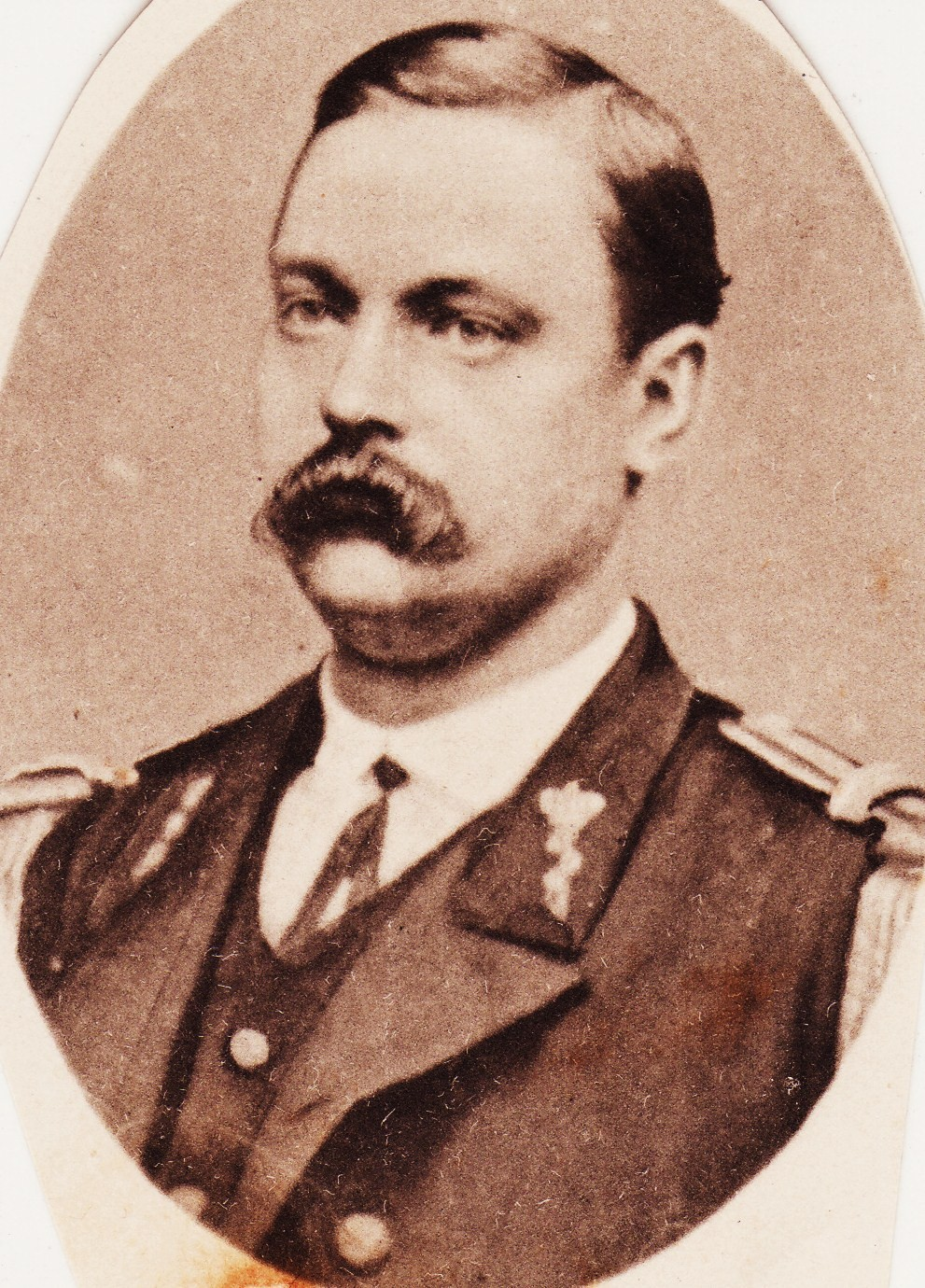
D. Matak Fontein

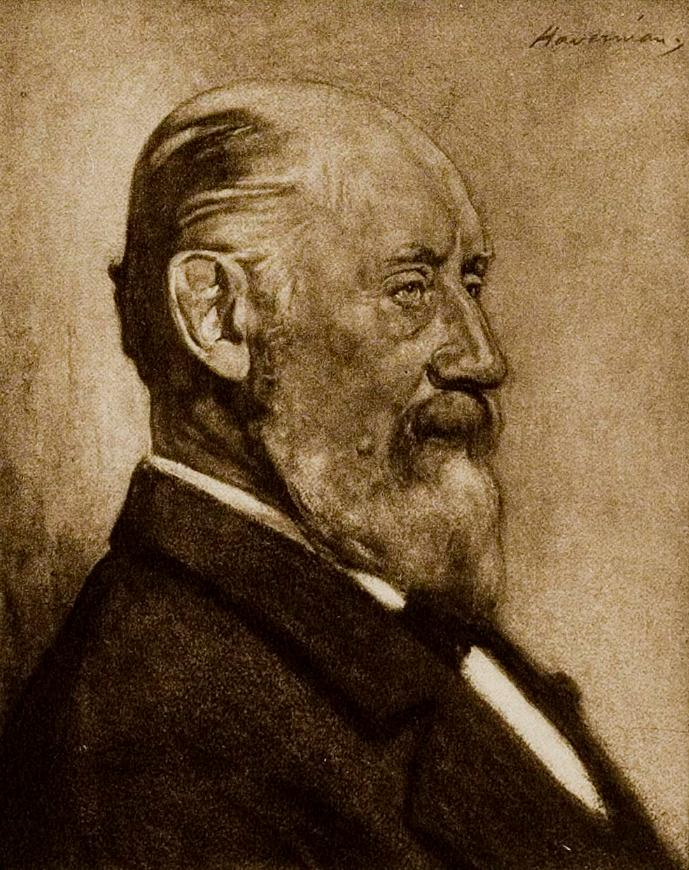
H.W. Mesdag

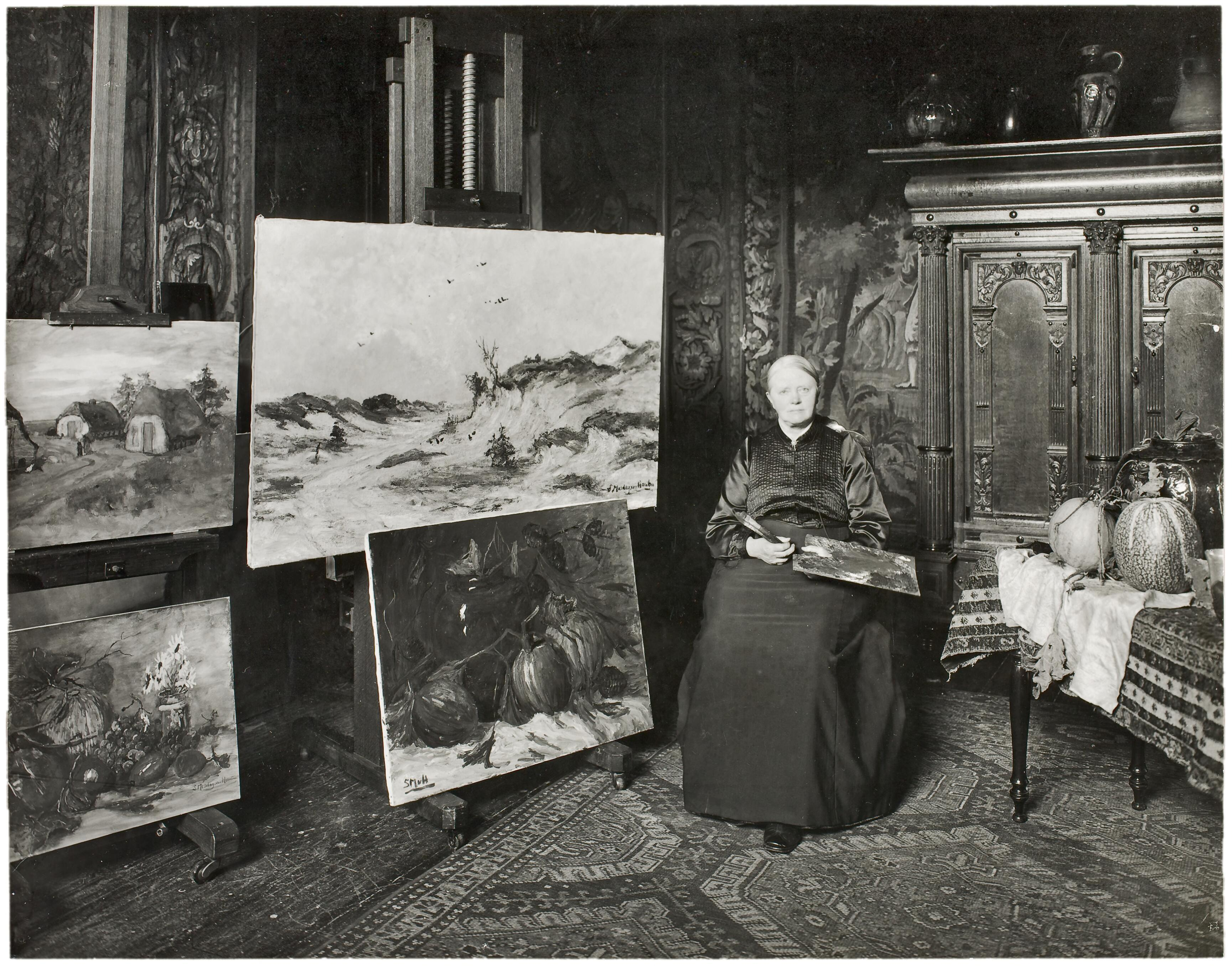
S. Mesdag-van Houten

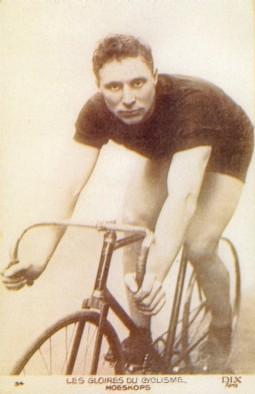
P. Moeskops

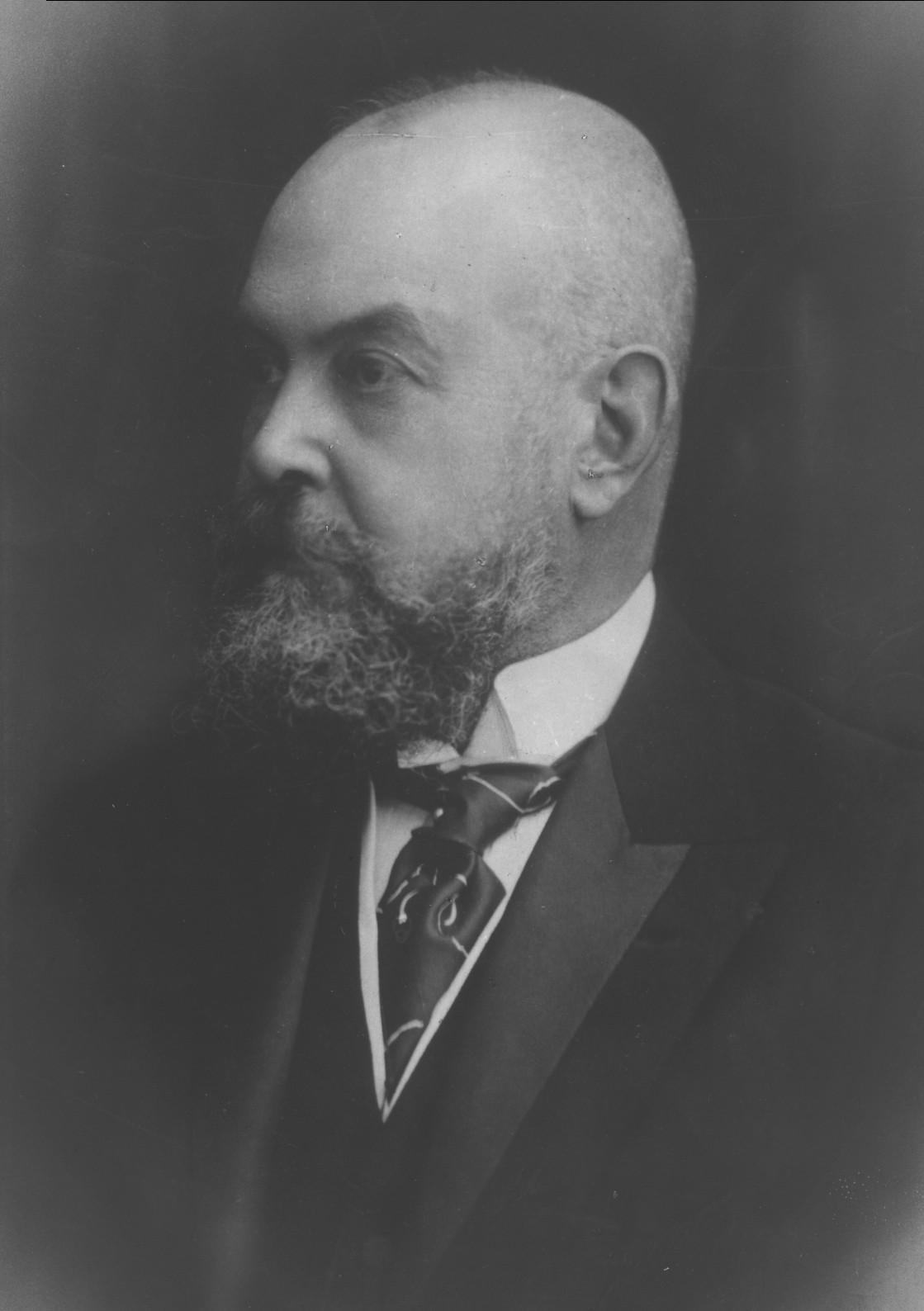
H.P.N. Muller

== N ==
- Adriaan Johan Charles de Neve (1857–1913), assistant resident in Aceh (Military William Order)
- Gerardus Philippus Marius van der Noordaa (1847–1904), major (Military William Order)
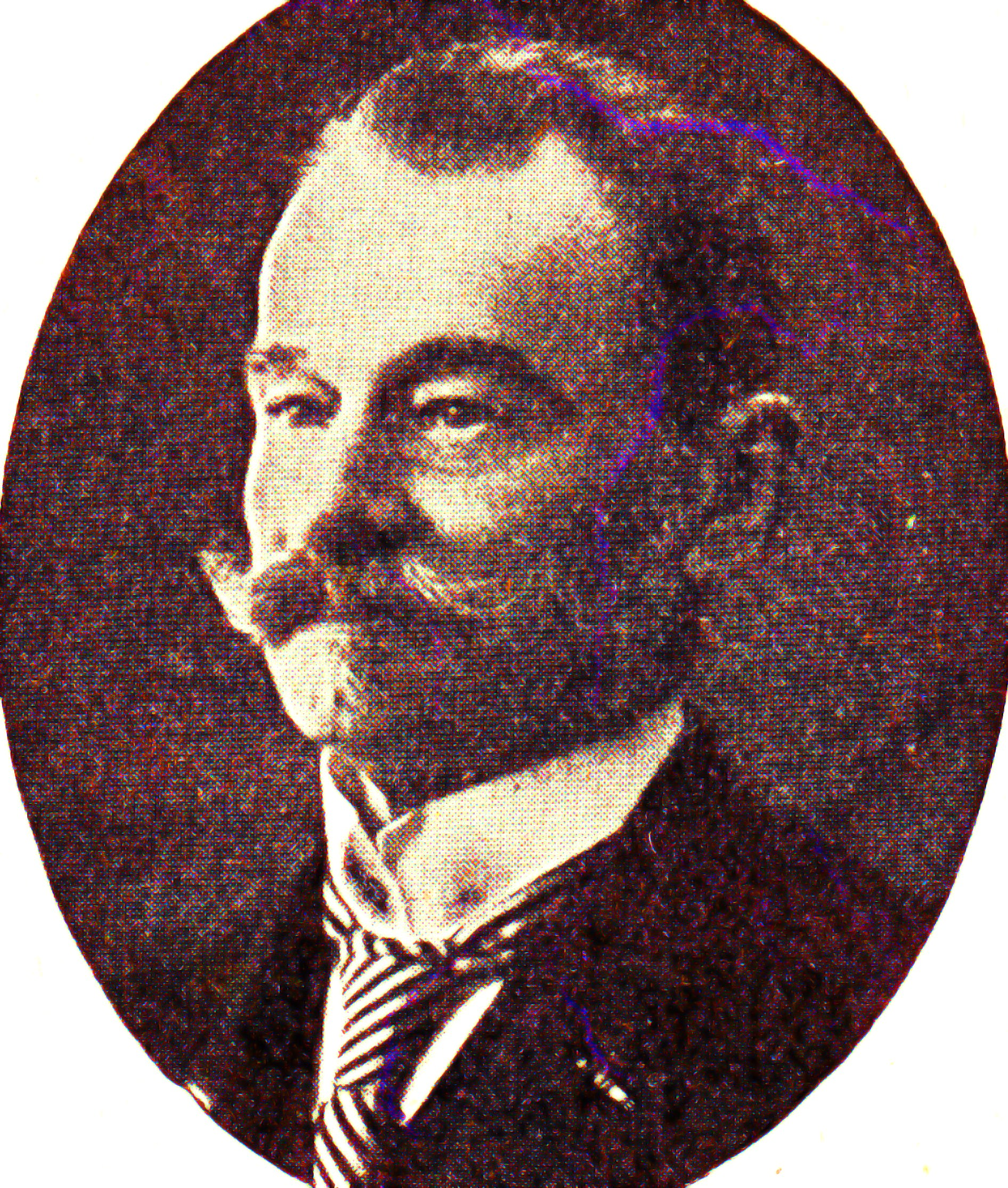
A.J.C. de Neve

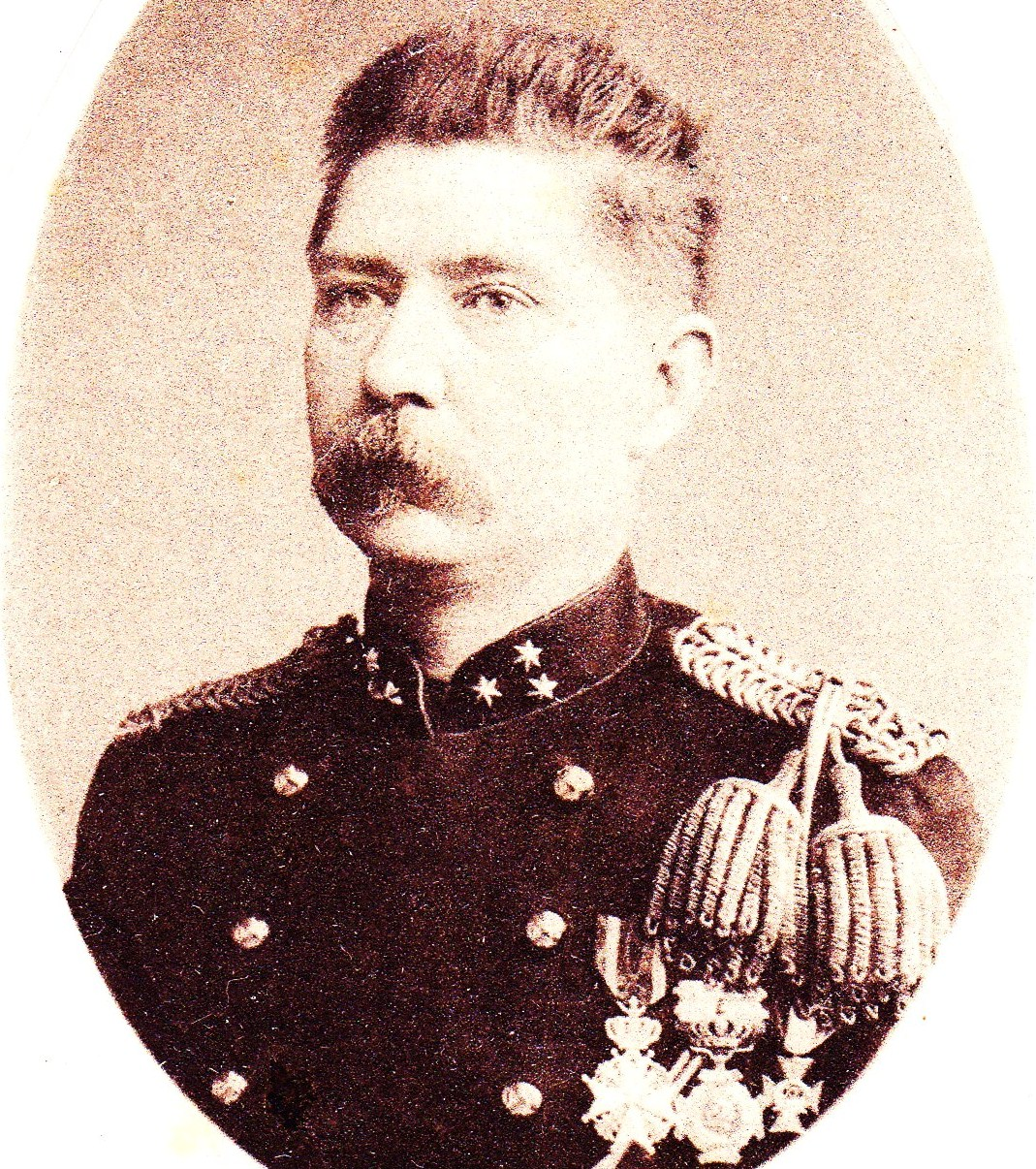
G.P.M. van der Noordaa

== O ==
- Antonie Frederik Jan Floris Jacob van Omphal (1788–1863), lieutenant general
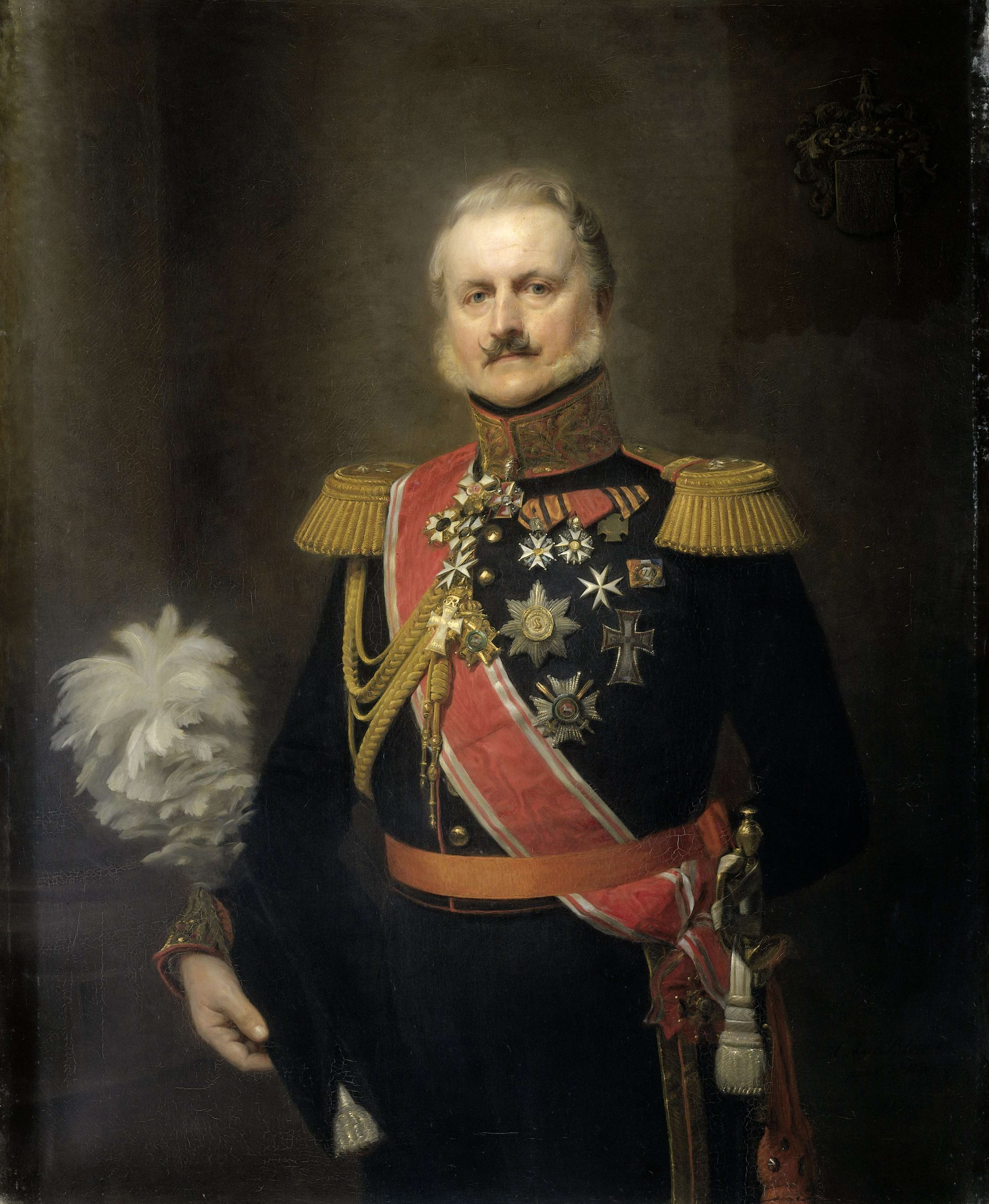
A.F.J.F.J. van Omphal

== P ==
- Jan Pieter Paauwe (1872–1956), preacher
- Jean-Louis Pisuisse (1880–1927), singer and comedian
- Nicolaas Jules Cesar van Polanen Petel (1855–1922), captain Royal Netherlands East Indies Army (Military William Order)
- Willem Frederik Pop (1858–1931), Minister of War
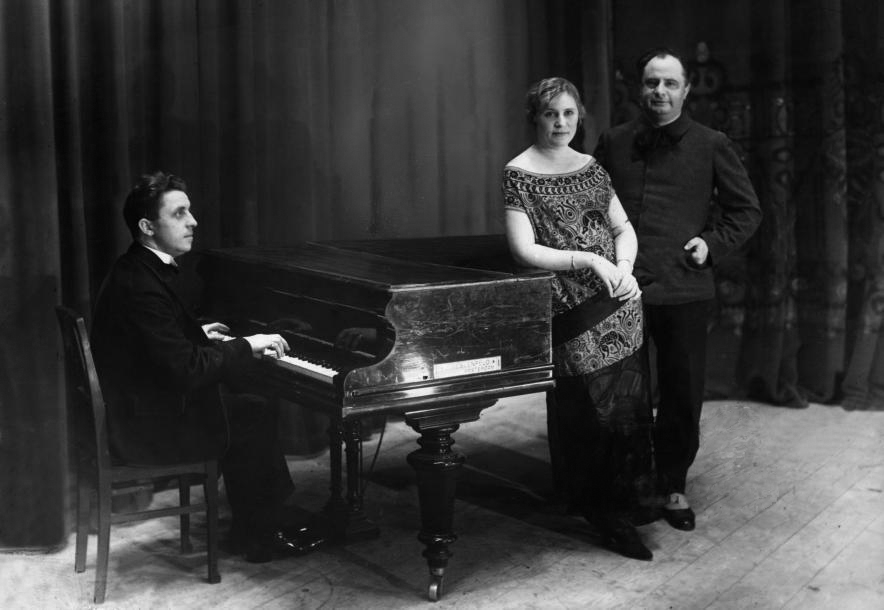
J-L. Pisuisse

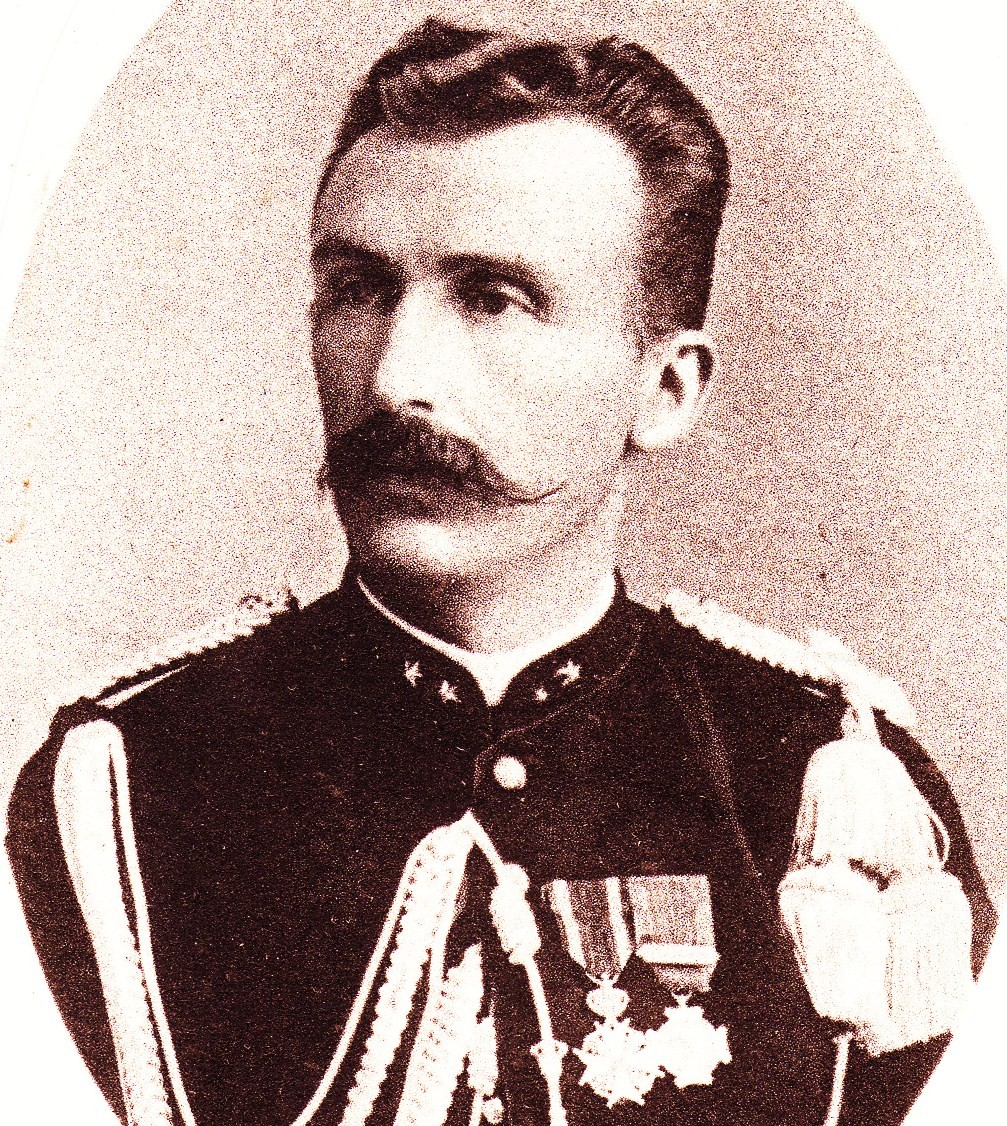
N.J.C. van Polanen Petel

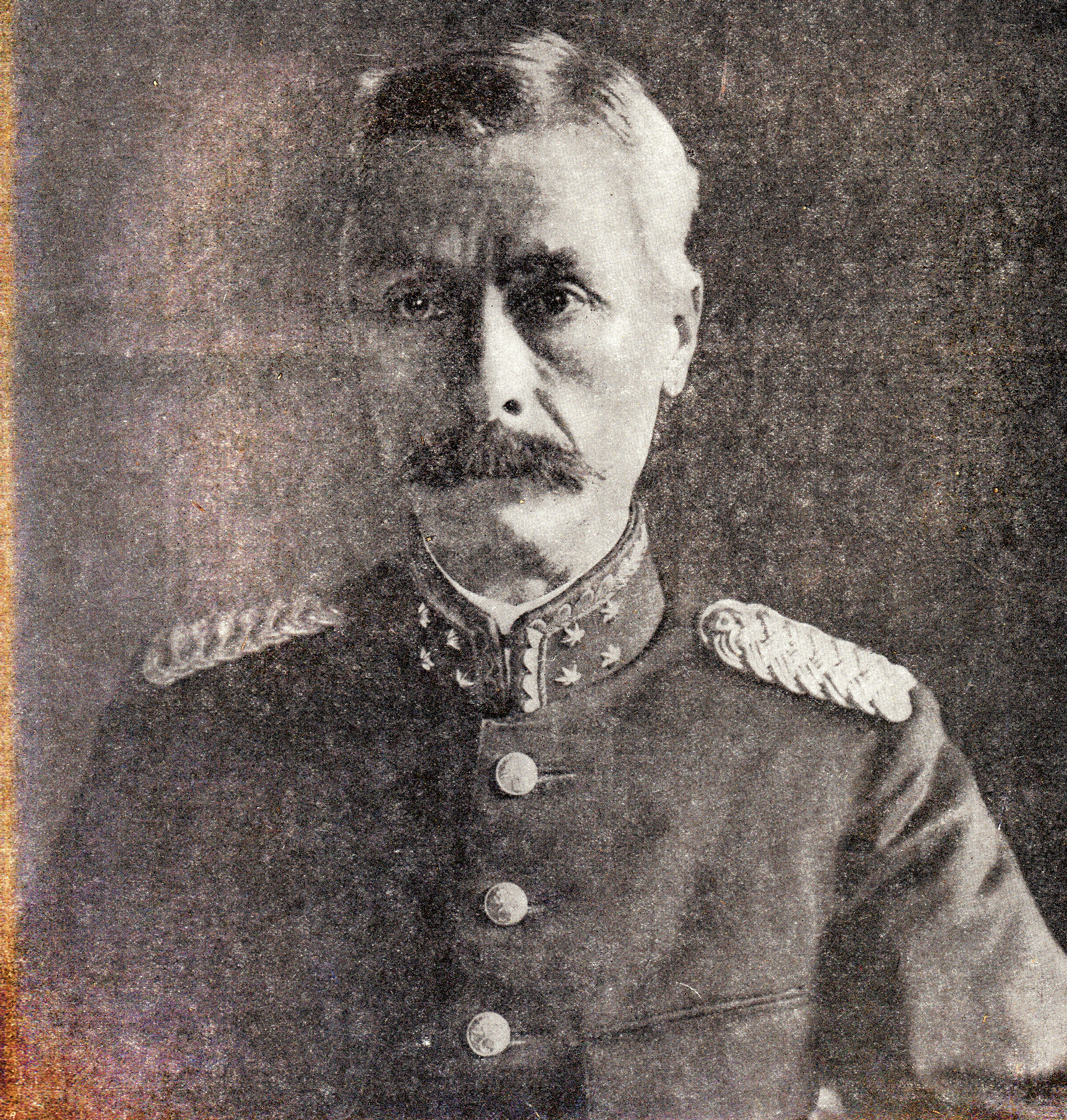
W.F. Pop

== Q ==
- Huibert Quispel (1841–1921), vice admiral (Military William Order)
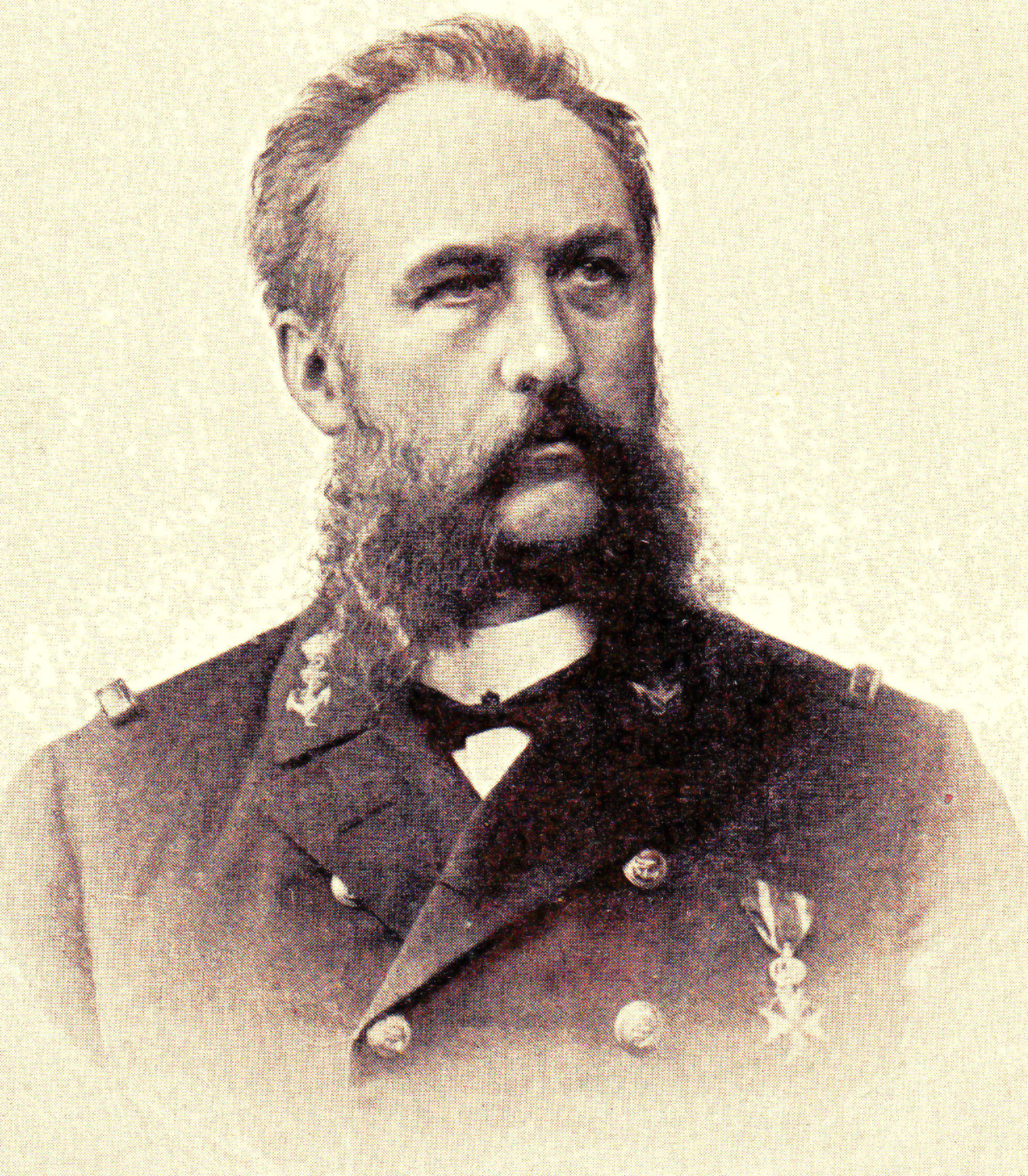
H. Quispel

== R ==
- Johan Hendrik Ram (1861–1913), aviation pioneer, officer and war reporter; friend of Louis Couperus
- Paul du Rieu (1859 (?)–1901), architect
- Julius Constantijn Rijk (1814–1891), admiral (Military William Order)
- Albert Johan Roest (1837–1920), mayor of The Hague
- Leonardus Johannes Warnerus van Rouveroy (1818–1897), major (Military William Order)
- Leonard Henri Ruyssenaers (1850–1913), secretary-general Hof van Arbitrage
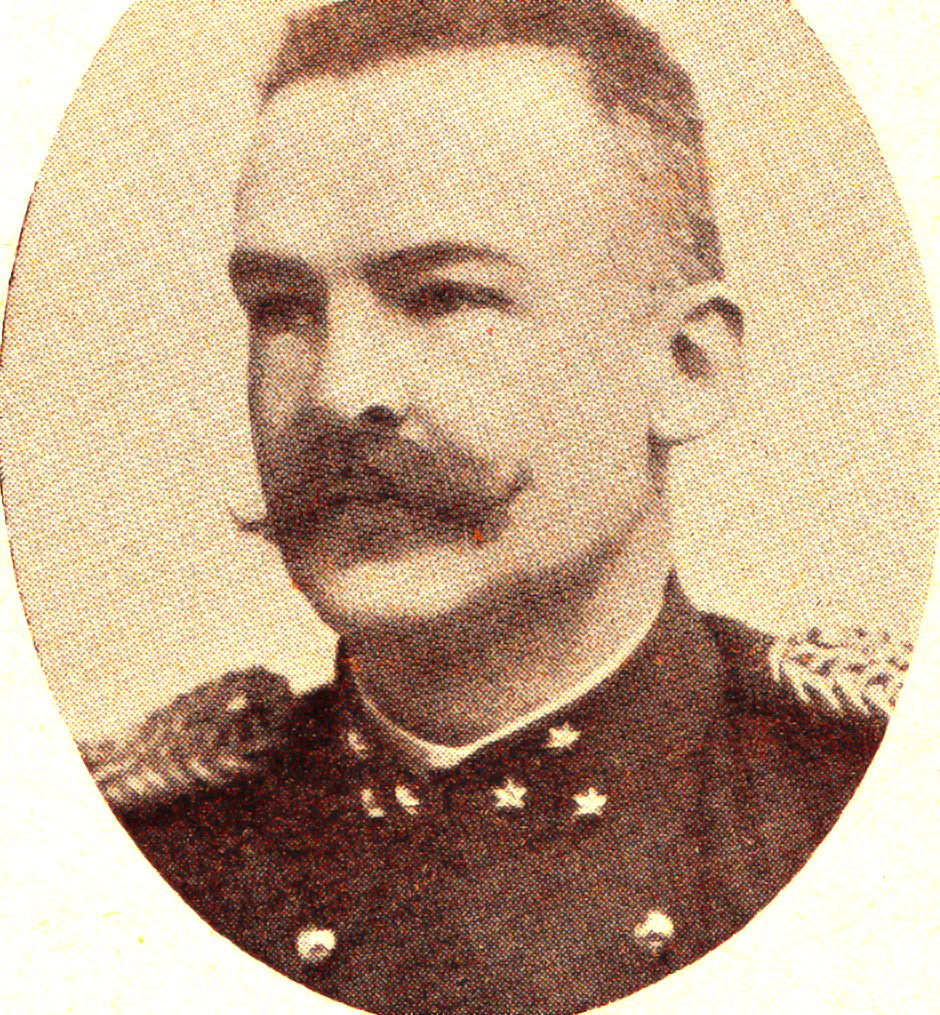
J.H. Ram

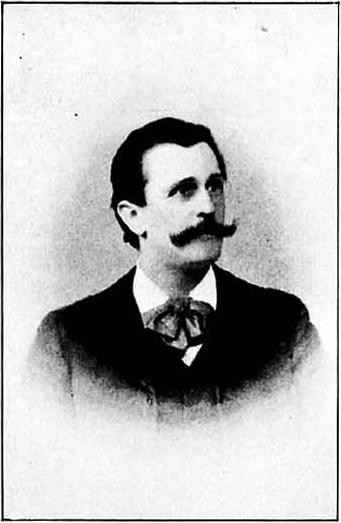
P. du Rieu

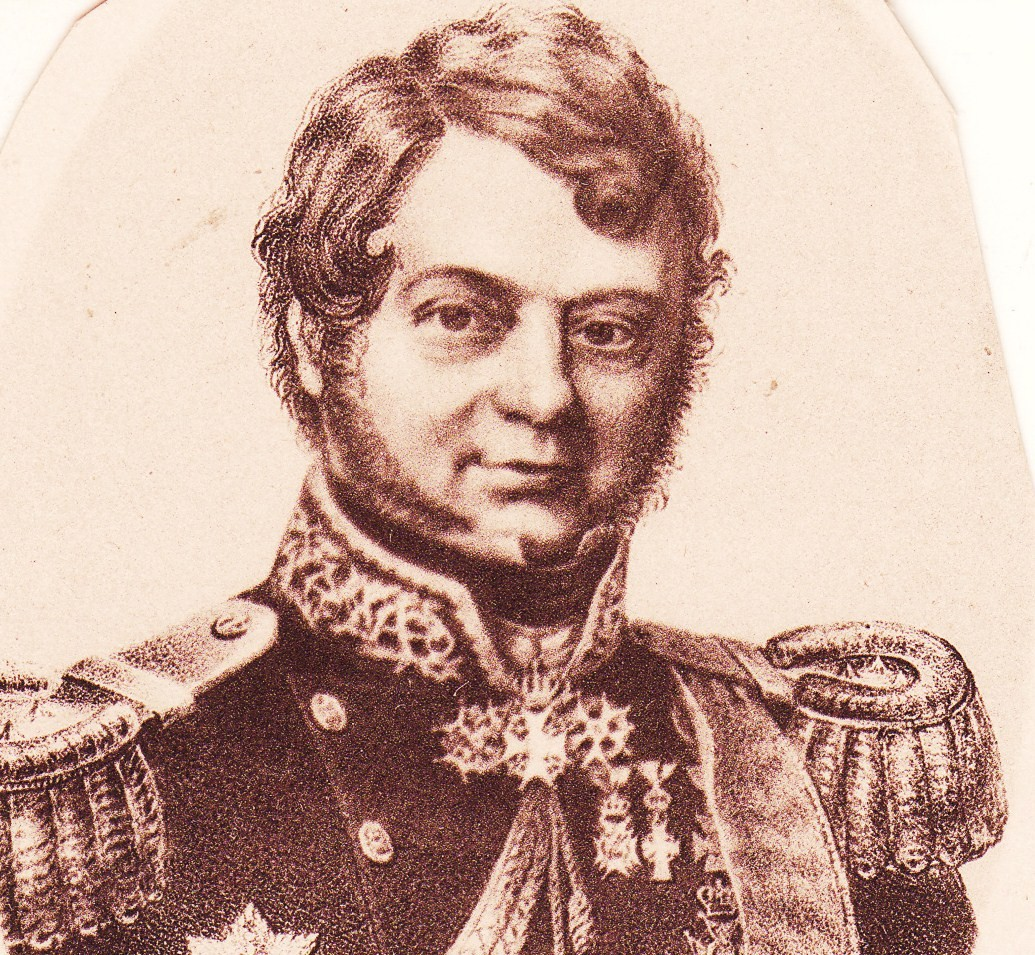
J.C. Rijk

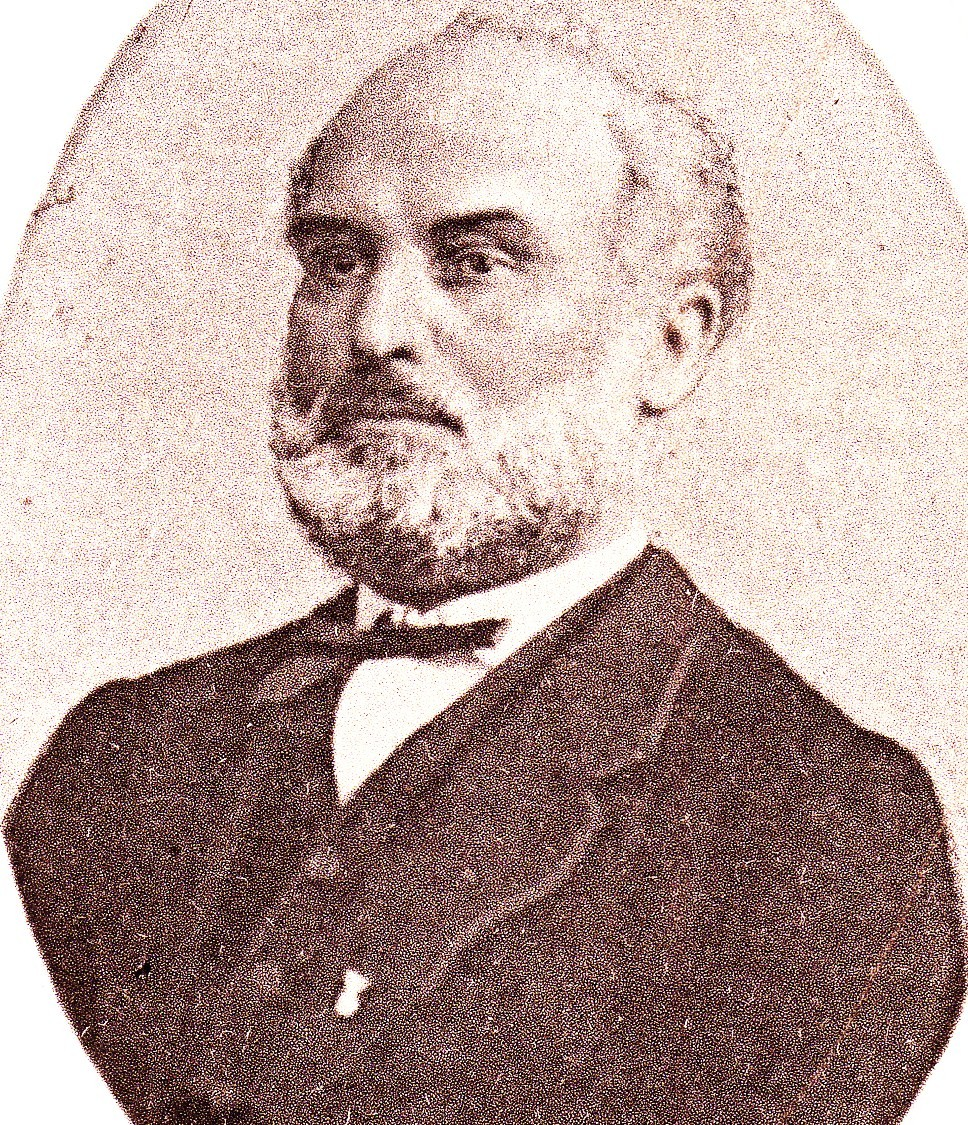
L.J.W. van Rouveroy

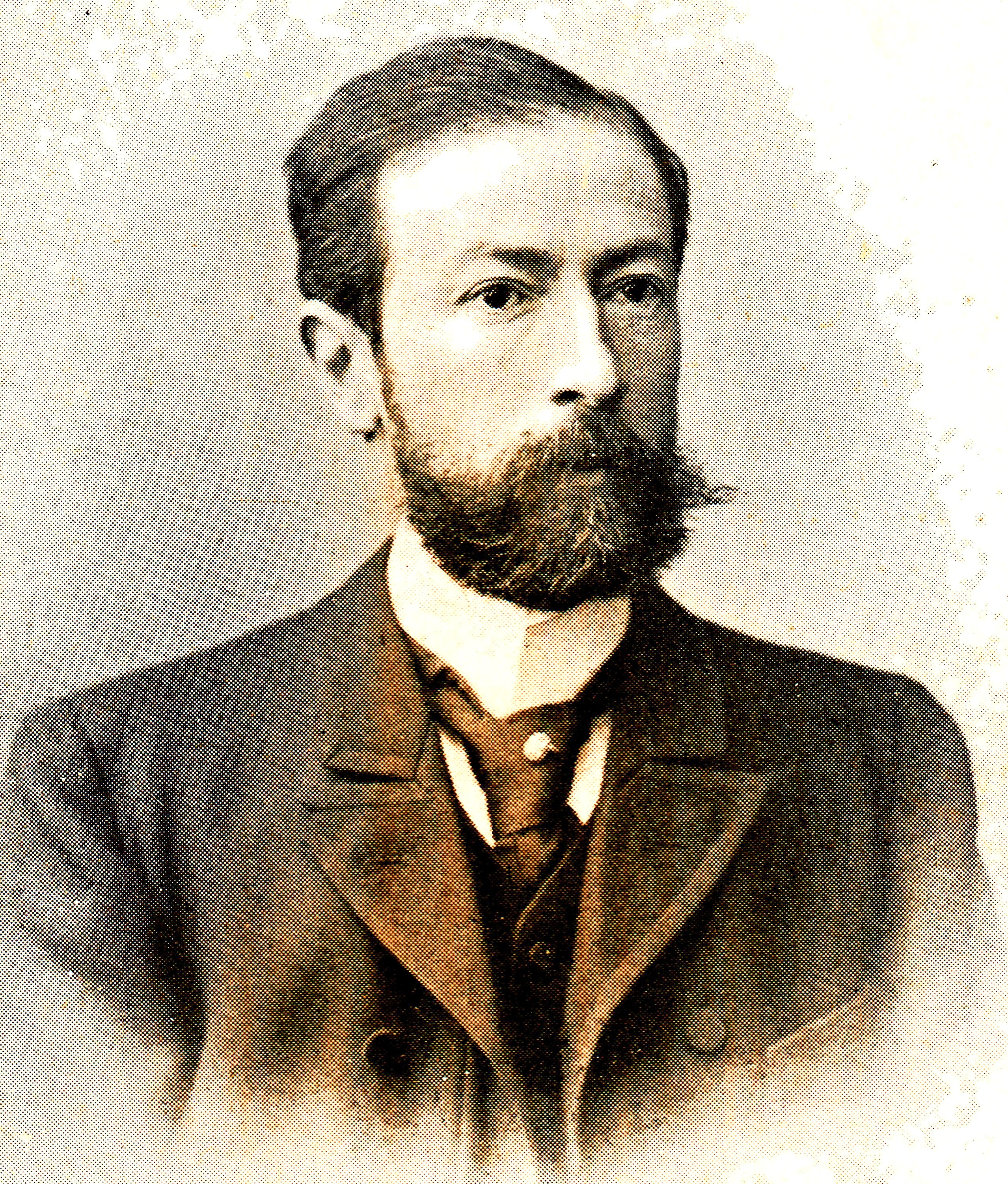
L.H. Ruyssenaers

== S ==
- Andreas Schelfhout (1787–1870), painter
- Jakob van Schevichaven (1866–1935), writer
- Aegidius Clemens August Schönstedt (1811–1881), lieutenant general (Military William Order)
- Jérôme Alexander Sillem (1902–1986), banker
- Jan Elias Nicolaas Sirtema van Grovestins (1842–1919), lieutenant general (Military William Order)
- Louis Philip Jacob Snabilié (1797–1865), officier van gezondheid (Military William Order)
- Cornelis Jacobus Snijders (1852–1939), lieutenant general (Military William Order)
- Alfred van Sprang (1917–1960), journalist
- Jan Springer (1850–1915), architect
- Nicolaas Pieter van der Stok (1841–1907), officier van gezondheid (Military William Order)
- Jacques Henri Leonard Jean Sweerts de Landas Wyborgh (1851–1912), vice admiral
- Jan van Swieten (1807–1888), commander of the Royal Netherlands East Indies Army
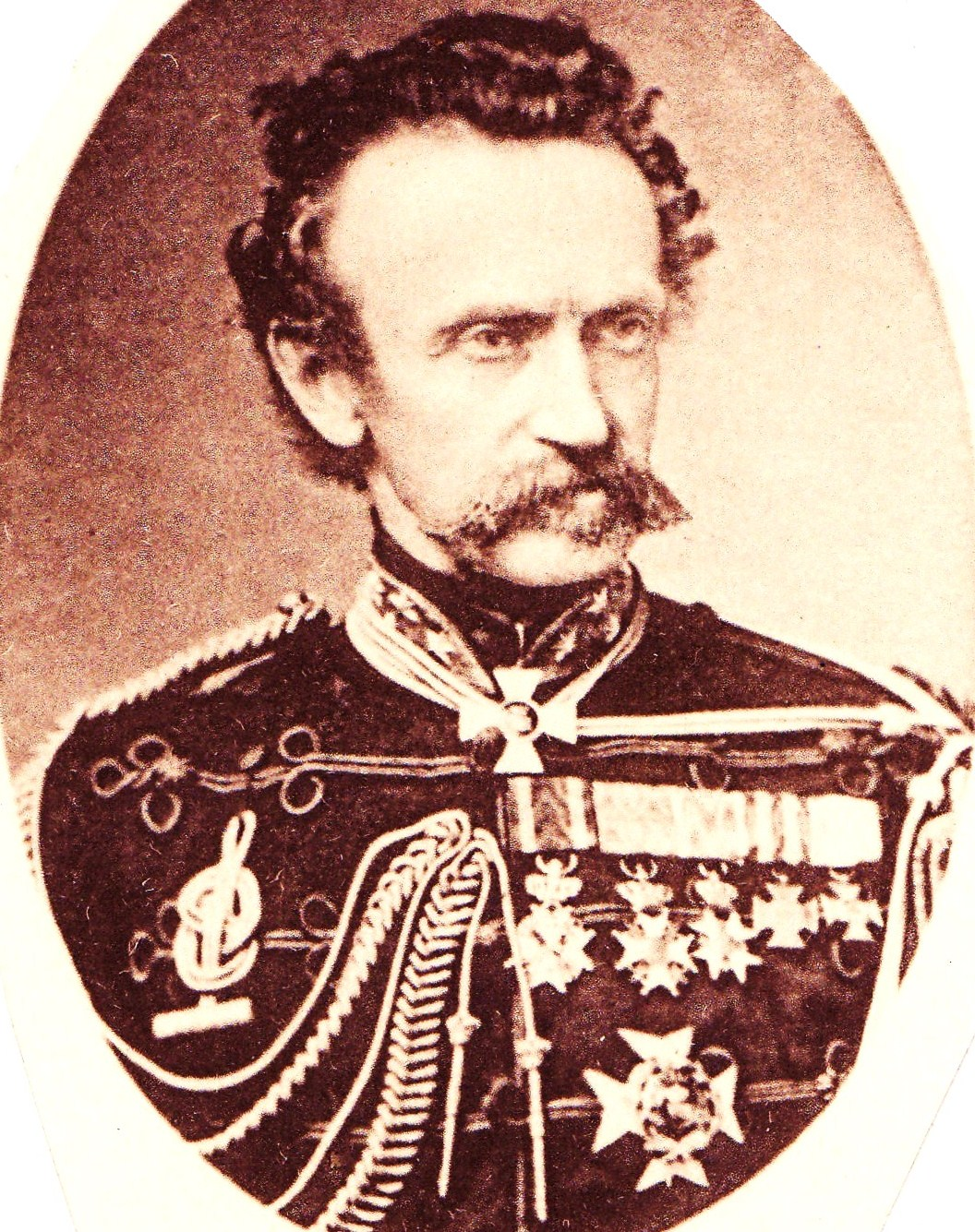
A.C.A. Schönstedt

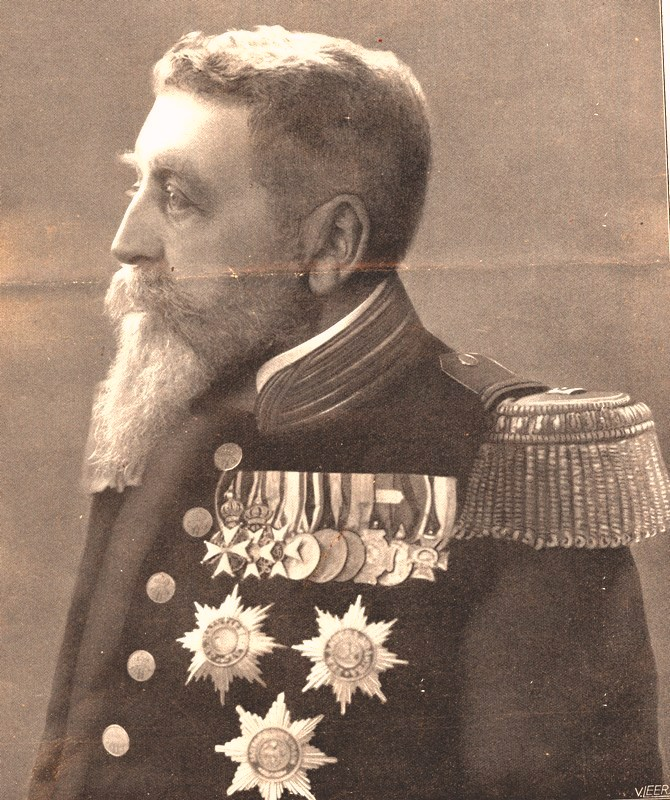
J.E.N. Sirtema van Grovestins

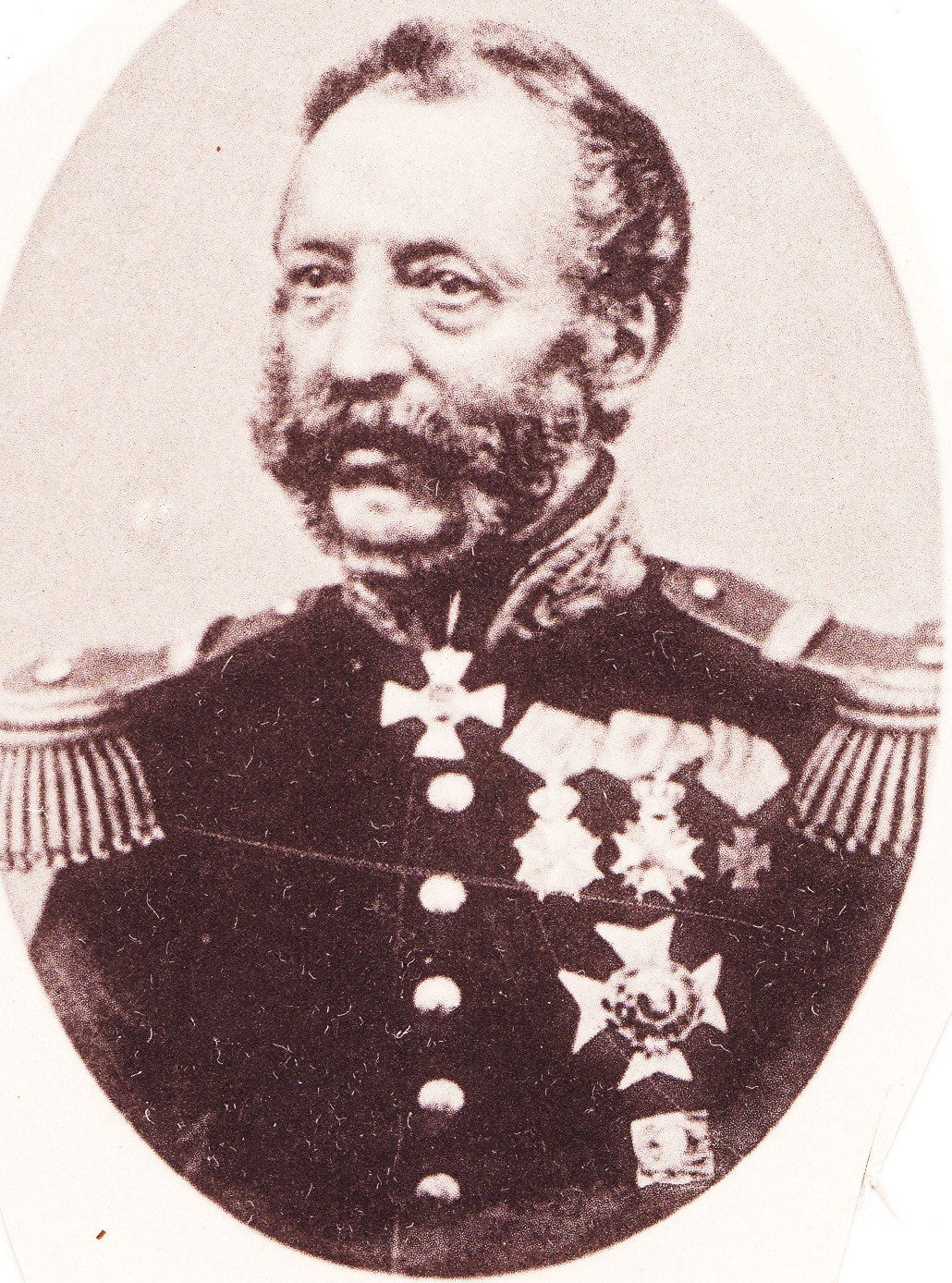
L.P.J. Snabilié

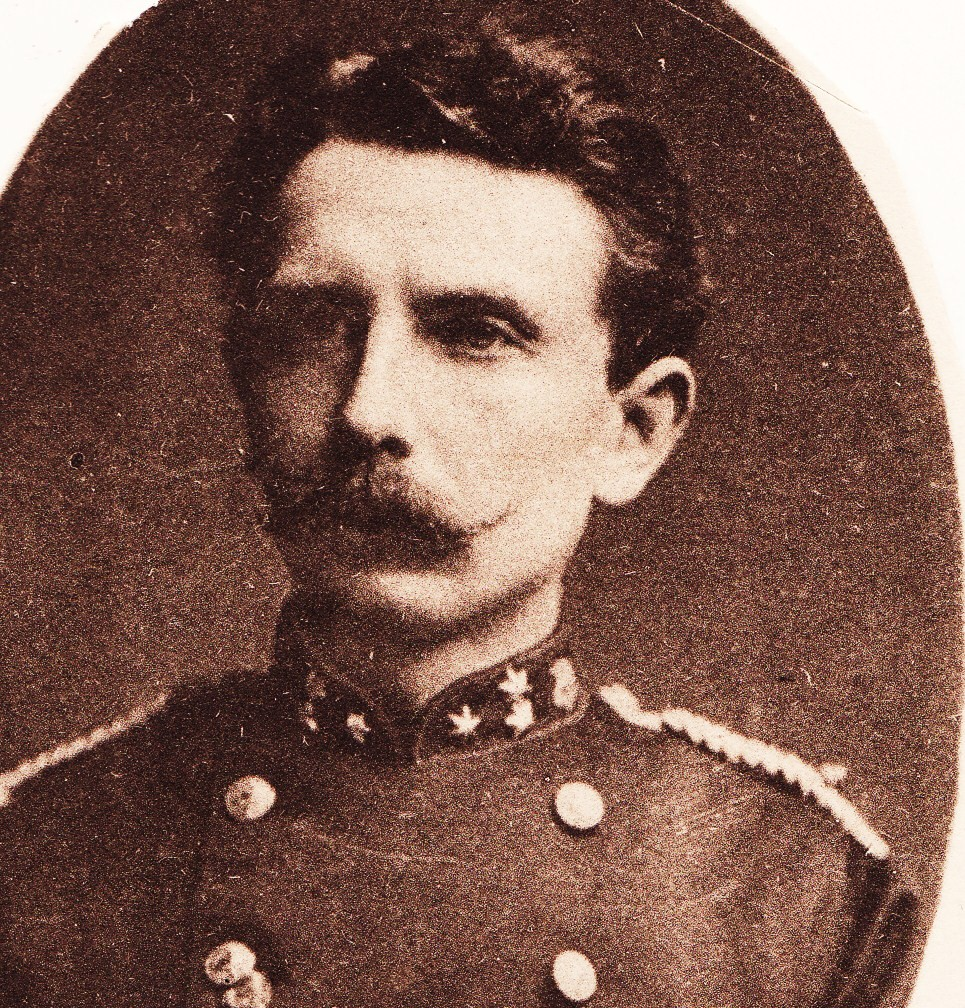
C.J. Snijders

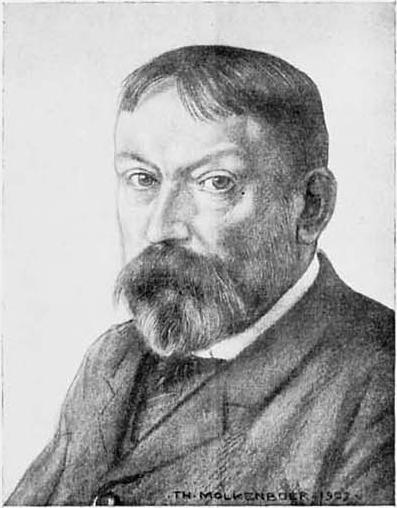
J.L. Springer

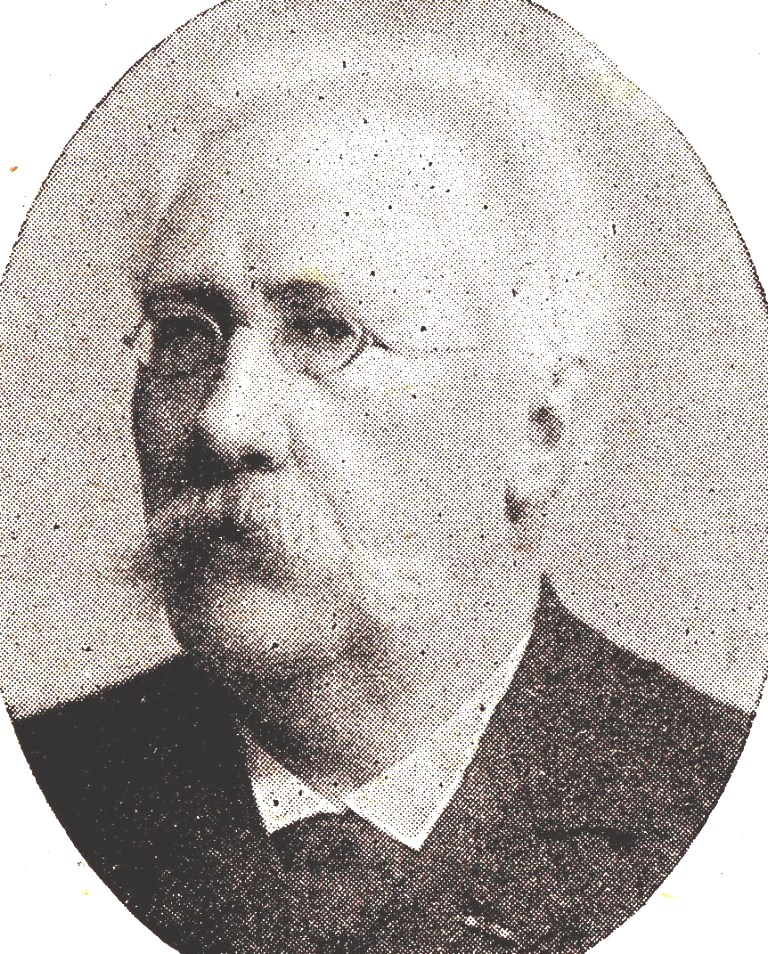
N.P. van der Stok

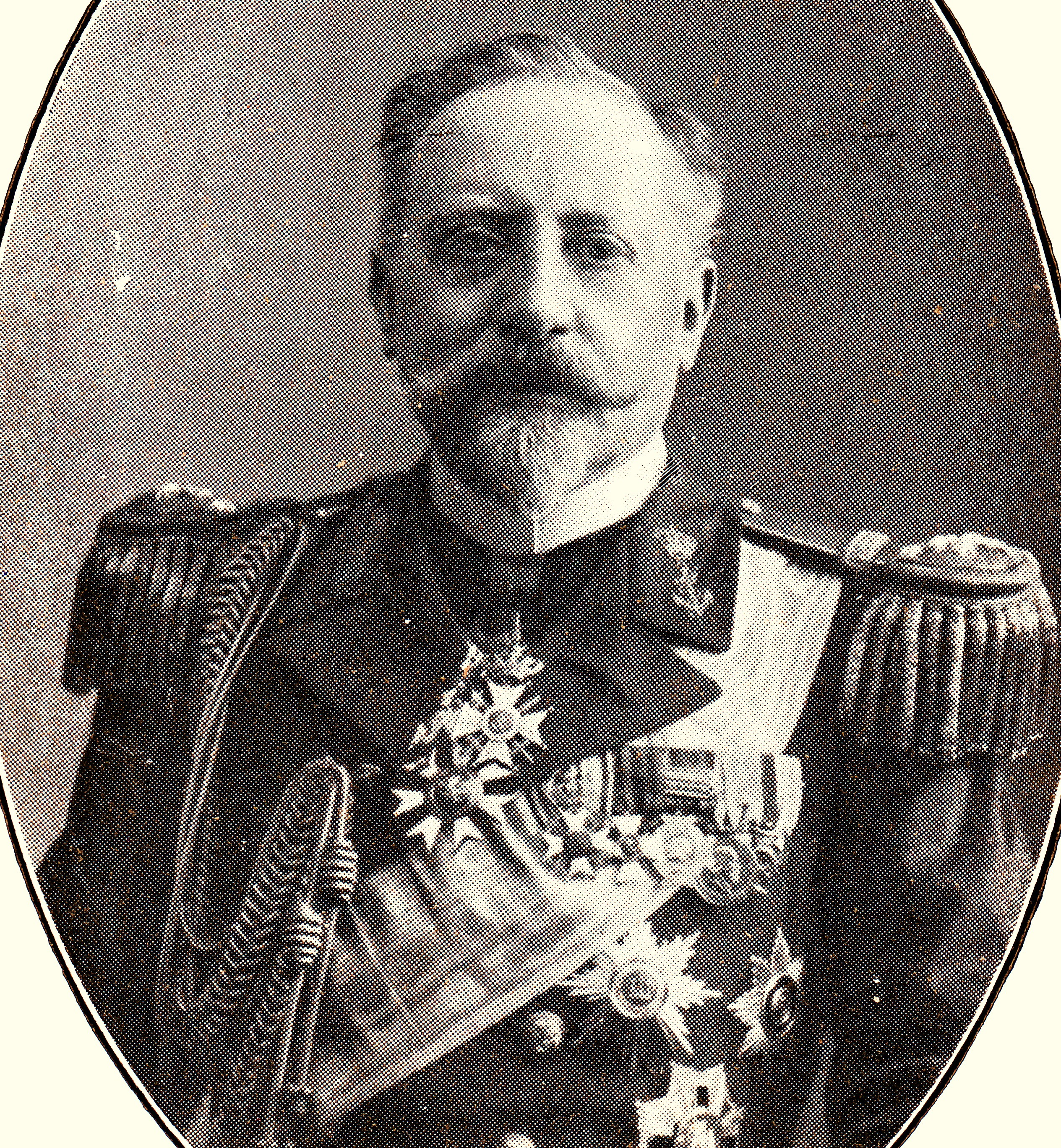
J.H.L.J. baron Sweerts de Landas Wyborgh

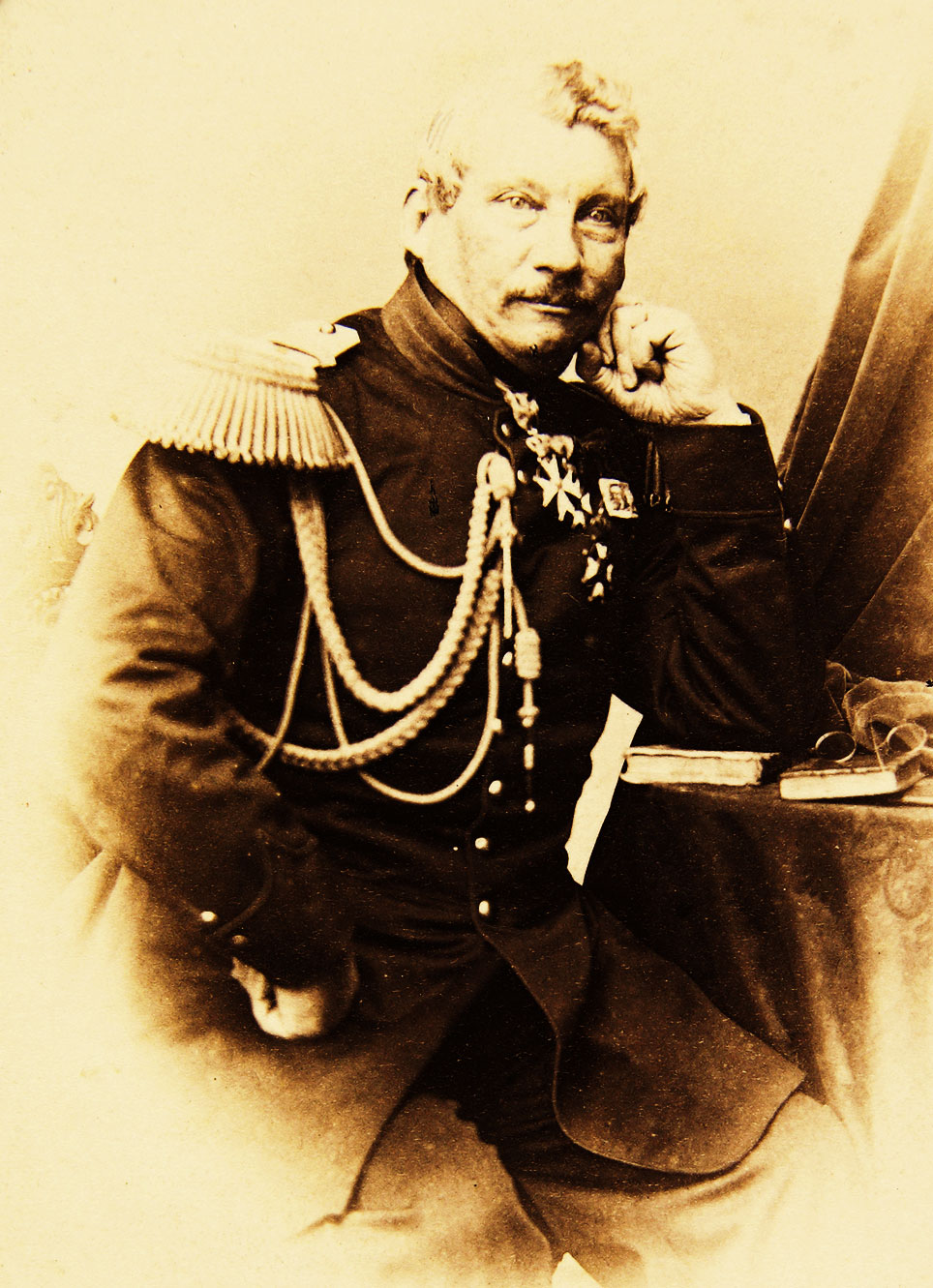
J. van Swieten

== T ==
- Adriën Telders (1843–1913), vice president of the Supreme Court
- Henricus Martinus Tersteege (1828–1916), lieutenant colonel (Military William Order)
- Jaap van Till (1900–1977), banker
- Jan Tinbergen (1903–1994), economist
- Frederik Willem Hendrik Tuinenburg (1857–1921), major Royal Netherlands East Indies Army (Military William Order)
- Ernest Frederik Christiaan Hendrik Joan van Tuyll van Serooskerken (1850–1916), major general
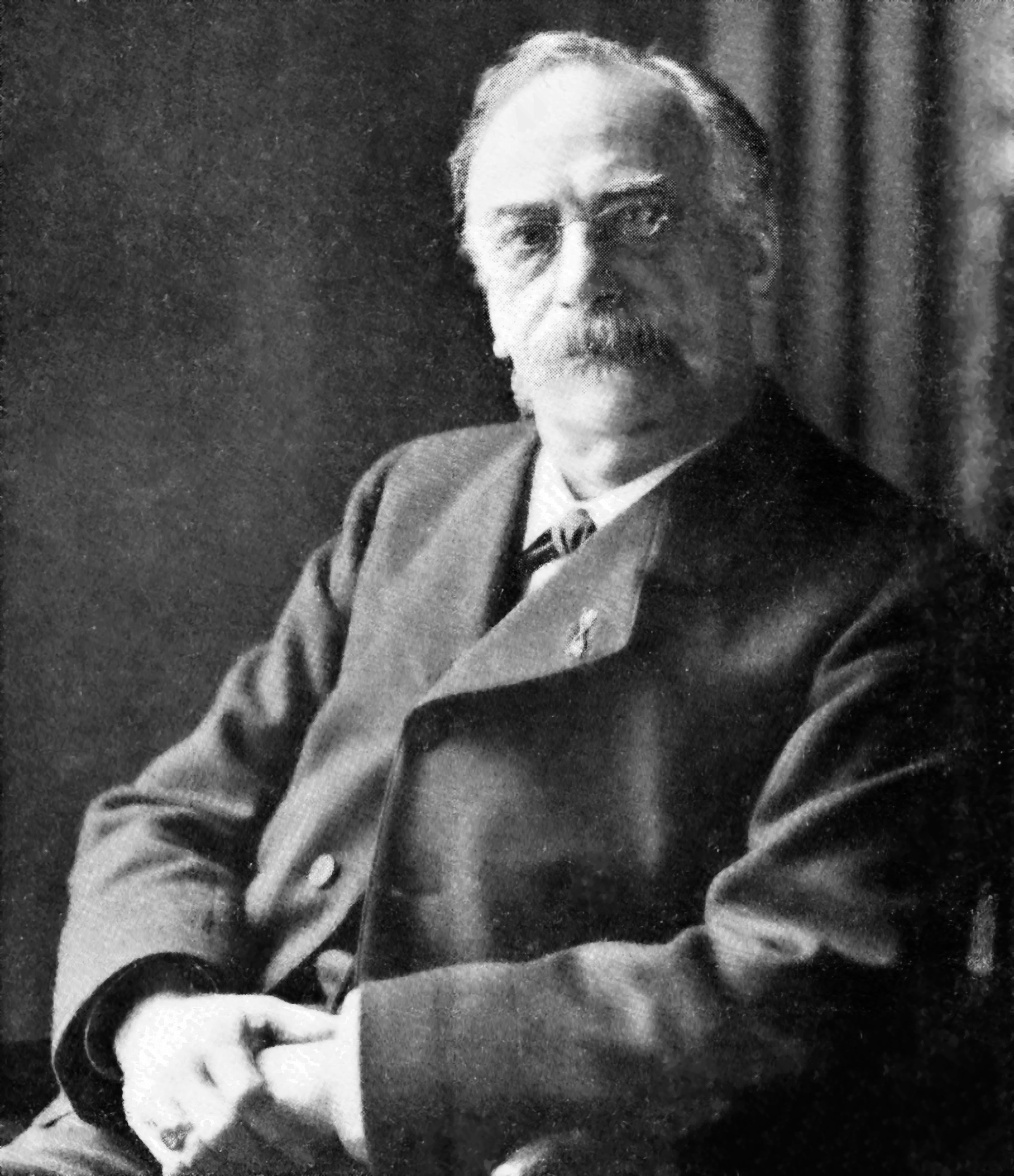
A. Telders

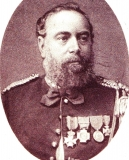
H.M. Tersteege

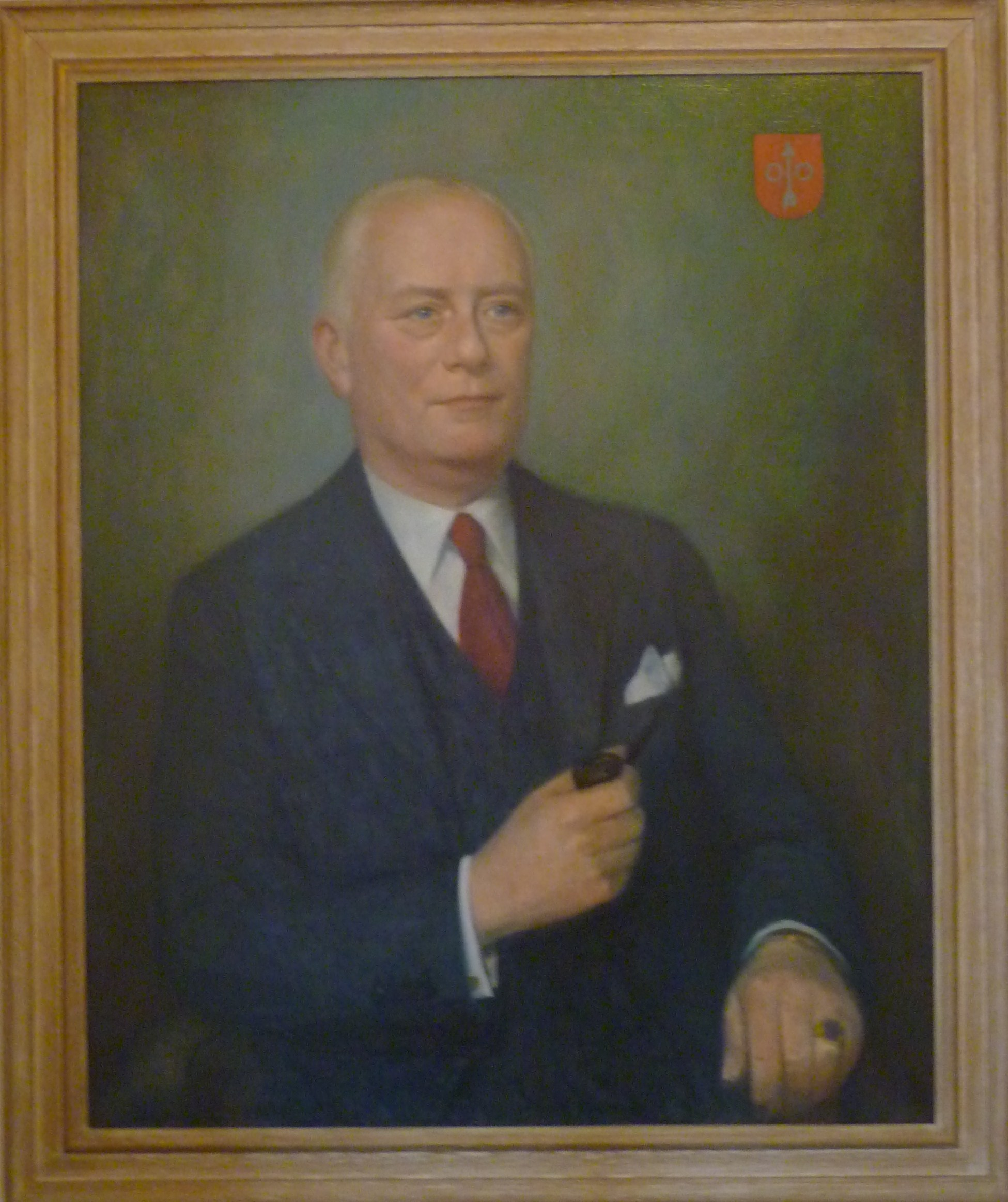
J.C.C. van Till

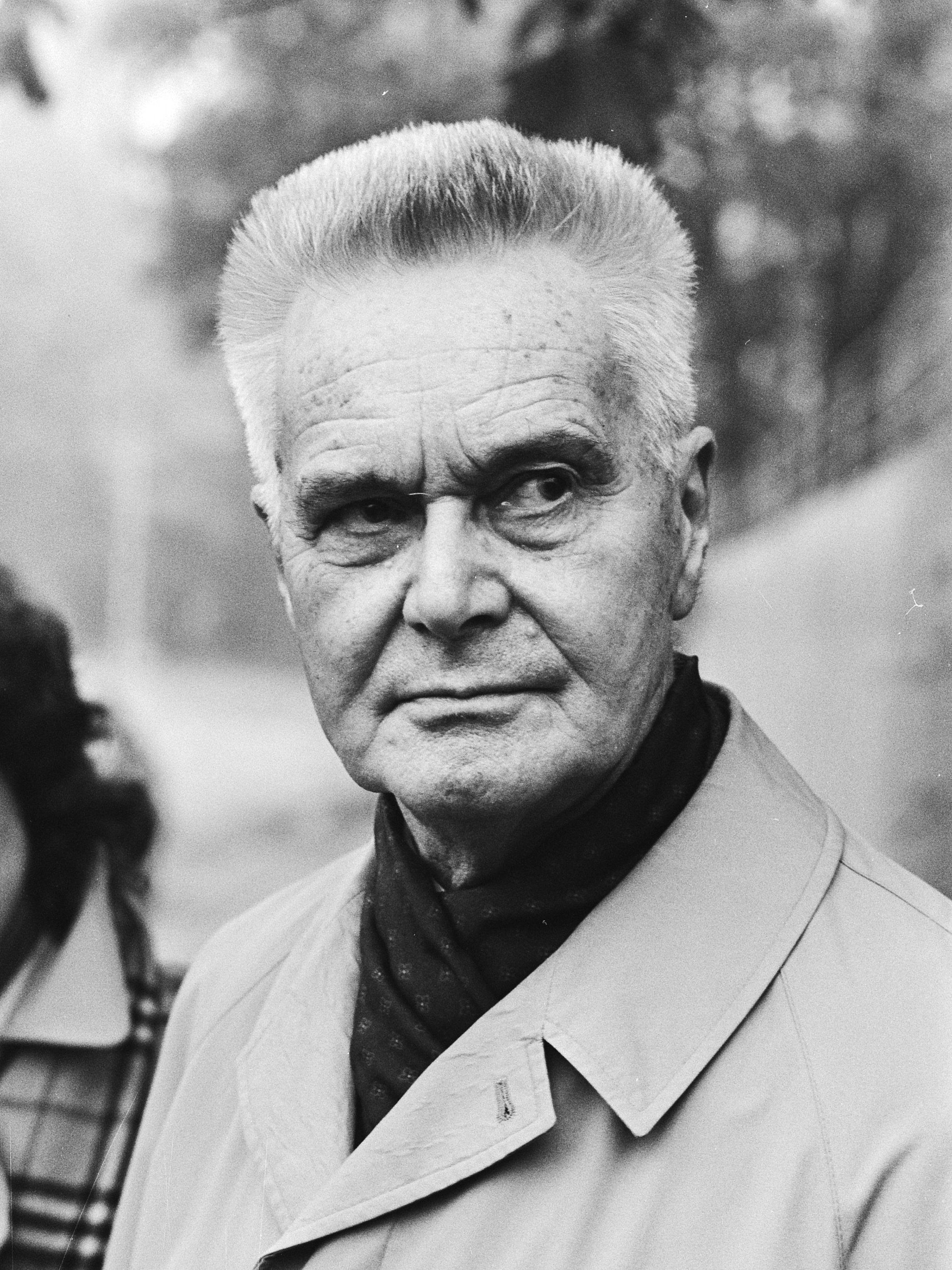
J. Tinbergen

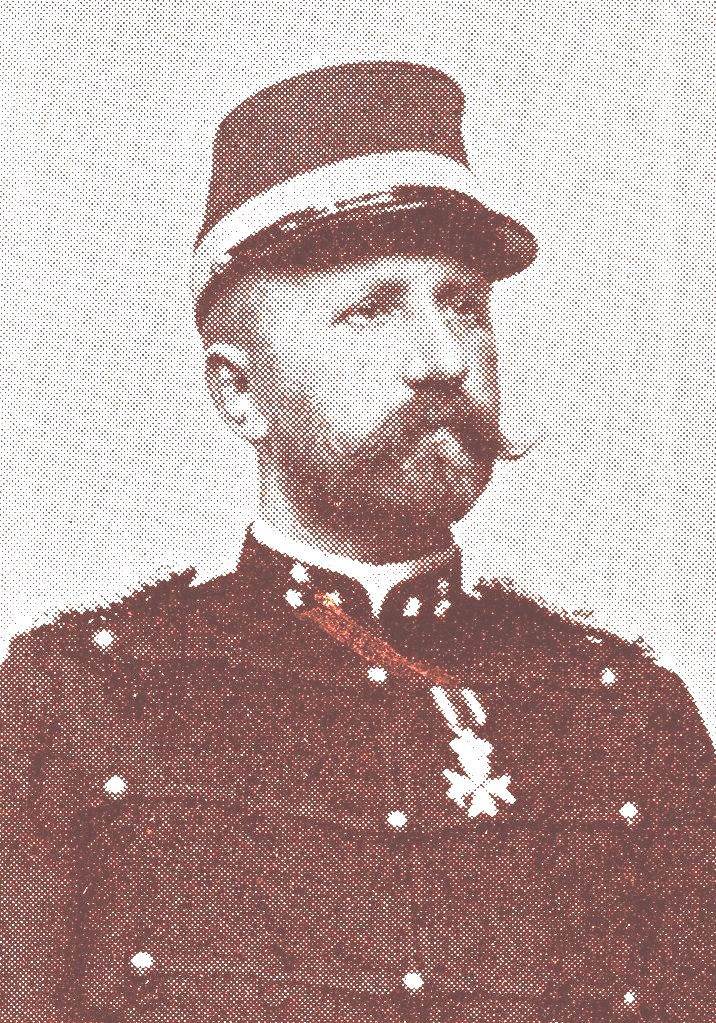
F.W.H. Tuinenburg

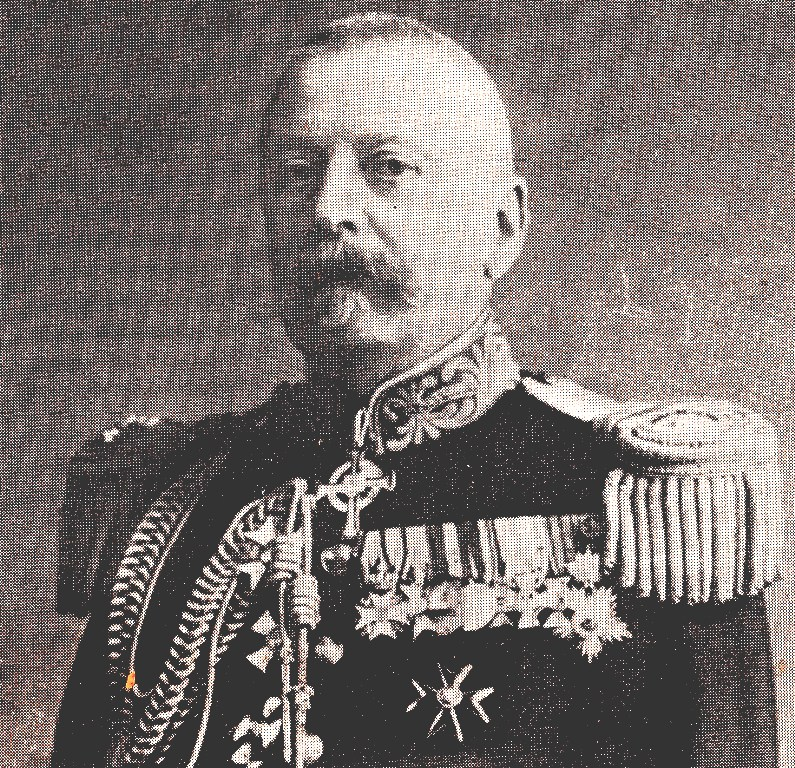
E.F.C.H.J. van Tuyll van Serooskerken

== V ==
- Koen Verhoeff (1928–1989), sports reporter
- Han Voskuil (1926–2008), writer
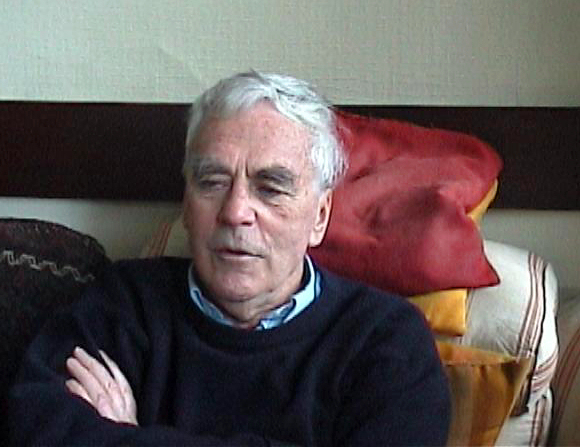
J.J. Voskuil

== W ==
- Davina van Wely (1922–2004) (ashes), violinist
- Johan Lodewijk Leonard Marinus Wittich (1858–1941), first lieutenant, Royal Netherlands East Indies Army
- Albert Willem Frederik Cornelis van Woerden (1851–1914), schout-bij-nacht
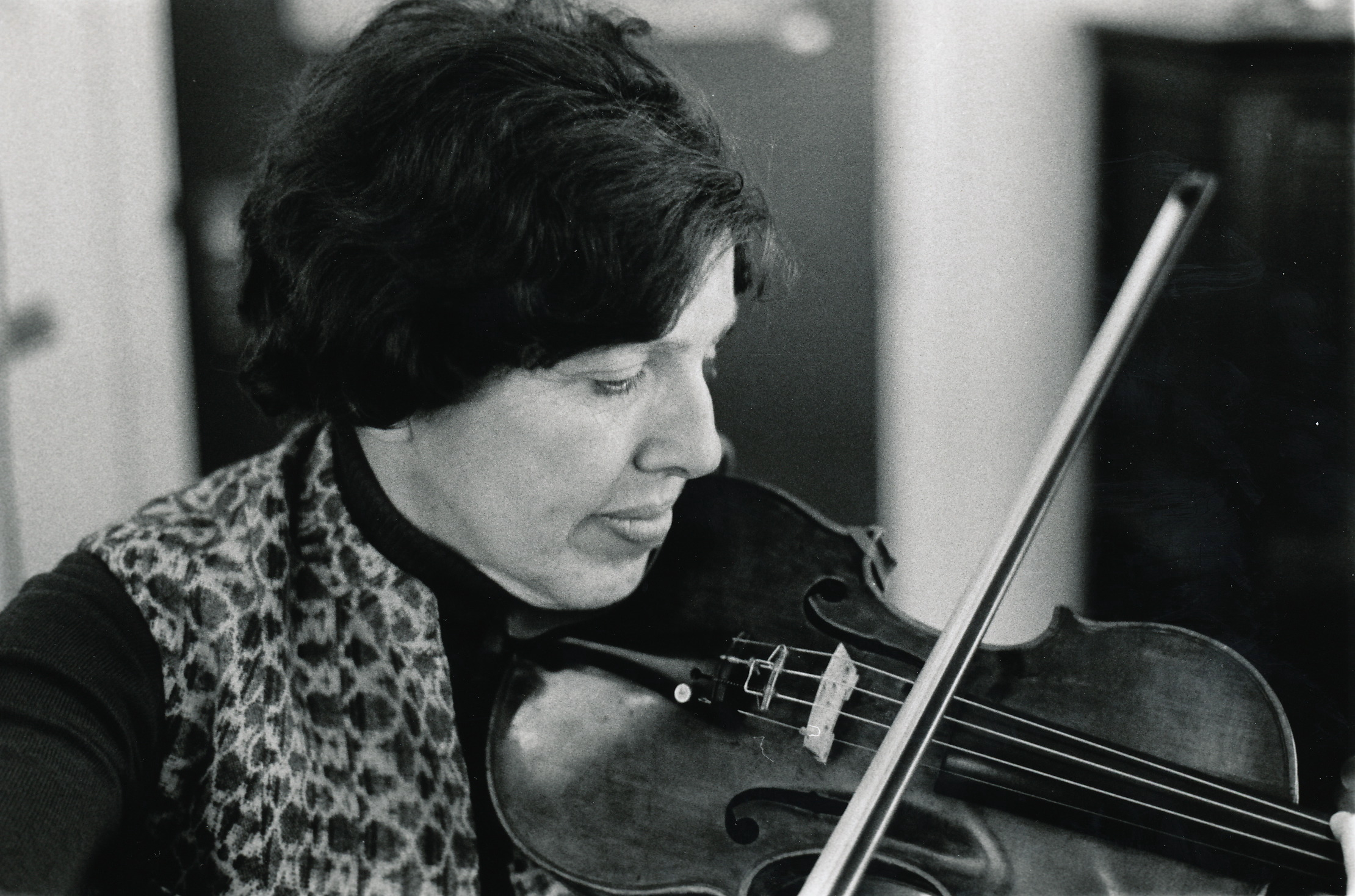
D. van Wely

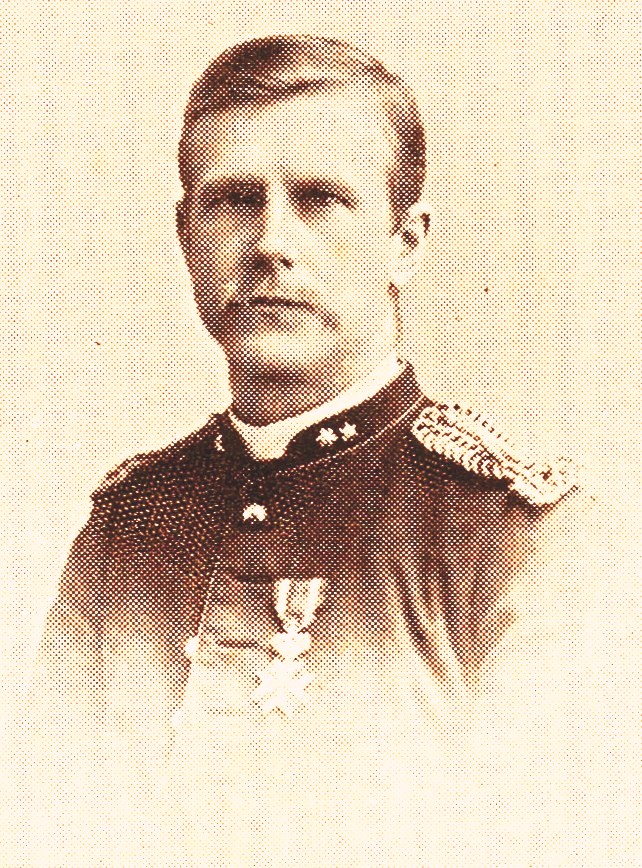
J.L.L.M. Wittich

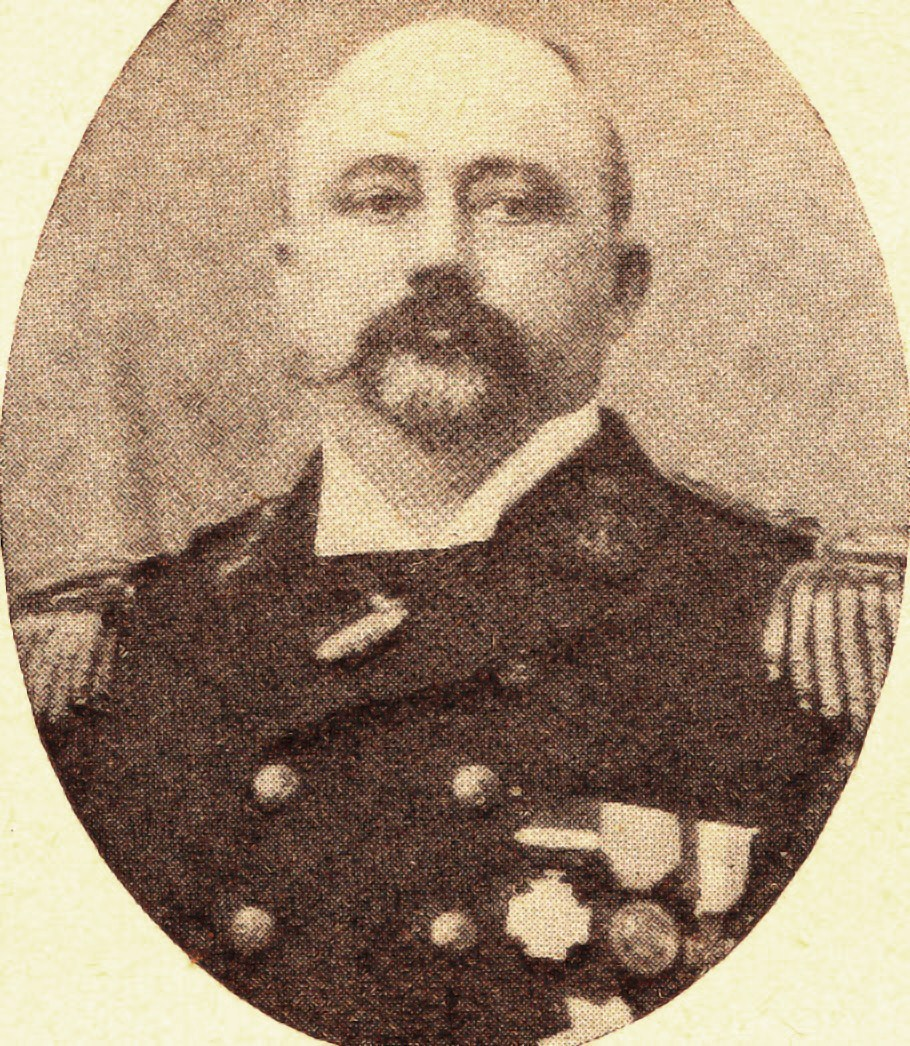
A.W.F.C. van Woerden

== Y ==
- Yi Tjoune (1859–1907), Korean diplomat (reburied in Korea in 1963)
