= Red Week (Netherlands) =

Unsuccessful revolution that occurred November 1918 in the Netherlands

- Part of the revolutions of 1917–23
- Cartoon of the aftermath of the Red Week from De Amsterdammer titled "Revolution hangover". Pieter Jelles Troelstra, David Wijnkoop and Henriette Roland Holst are depicted not feeling well after the Red Week.
- Date: 9–16 November 1918
- Location: Netherlands
- Caused by: Aftermath of World War I
- Goals: Socialist revolution
- Result: No revolution

Parties
Dutch government	Social Democratic Workers' Party	Revolutionary socialists

Casualties
- Deaths: 4

The Red Week (Dutch: Ro(o)de Week) was a period from 9 to 16 November 1918 when a socialist revolution was anticipated in the Netherlands. The anticipation stemmed from revolutions elsewhere in Europe and calls for revolution by some socialists.

The most prominent call for revolution came from Pieter Jelles Troelstra, leader of the Social Democratic Workers' Party (SDAP). However, the majority of his party's leadership opposed a revolution and sought to calm their base. Meanwhile, the government took steps to prevent a revolution by strengthening security and implementing social measures. A counter-movement was formed by Catholic and Protestant groups.

On 13 November, revolutionary socialists led by David Wijnkoop and Henriette Roland Holst organised a demonstration in Amsterdam, which turned violent and resulted in the deaths of four protesters. The protest had no follow-up, and it soon became clear that no revolution was materialising. At the end of the week, Troelstra admitted he had misjudged the situation, which is why it became known as Troelstra's mistake (Dutch: Vergissing van Troelstra).

== Background ==
=== World War I ===
The Netherlands remained neutral during the First World War through careful diplomacy. Despite this neutrality, conscripts were mobilised. Food was rationed due to shortages, occasionally resulting in unrest, such as the 1917 Potato riots in Amsterdam. Unemployment was high, and the country was affected by the global Spanish flu pandemic.

==== Revolutionary wave ====
Starting in 1917, a series of revolutions occurred around the world, most notably the Russian Revolution of 1917. The main inspiration for the Netherlands was the German Revolution of 1918–1919, which began with minor mutinies in the navy on 28 October 1918 and the Kiel mutiny on 3 November 1918. This led to the formation of workers' and soldiers' councils. The abdication of German Emperor Wilhelm II was announced on 9 November 1918. An interim national revolutionary government was formed, led by the Social Democratic Party (SPD), the German sister party of the SDAP.

=== Socialism in the Netherlands ===
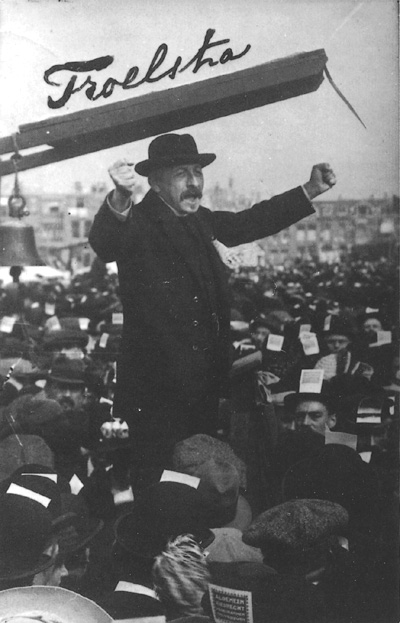
Pieter Jelles Troelstra (around 1912)

The Social Democratic Workers' Party (SDAP) was established in 1894 by a reformist faction that opposed the anarchist majority within the Social Democratic League (SDB). One of SDAP's prominent founders was Pieter Jelles Troelstra, who served as the party's leader from its inception. In 1909, a group of orthodox Marxists led by David Wijnkoop left the party to establish the communist Social Democratic Party (SDP, renamed to Communist Party in 1918). Unlike the SDP and SDB, the SDAP sought to achieve its objectives through parliamentary methods, but did not rule out a revolution.

Most political parties, including the SDAP, set aside their differences to maintain Dutch neutrality in the war. Following the Pacification of 1917, universal male suffrage — a long-standing demand of the SDAP — was introduced. The SDAP had high expectations for the general election of 3 July 1918, but their representation only increased from 15 to 22 seats (out of 100). In contrast, the General League of Roman Catholic Electoral Associations (ABRK) won 30 seats and formed the right-wing first Ruijs de Beerenbrouck cabinet together with the Anti-Revolutionary Party (ARP) and the Christian Historical Union (CHU).

=== Harskamp riots ===
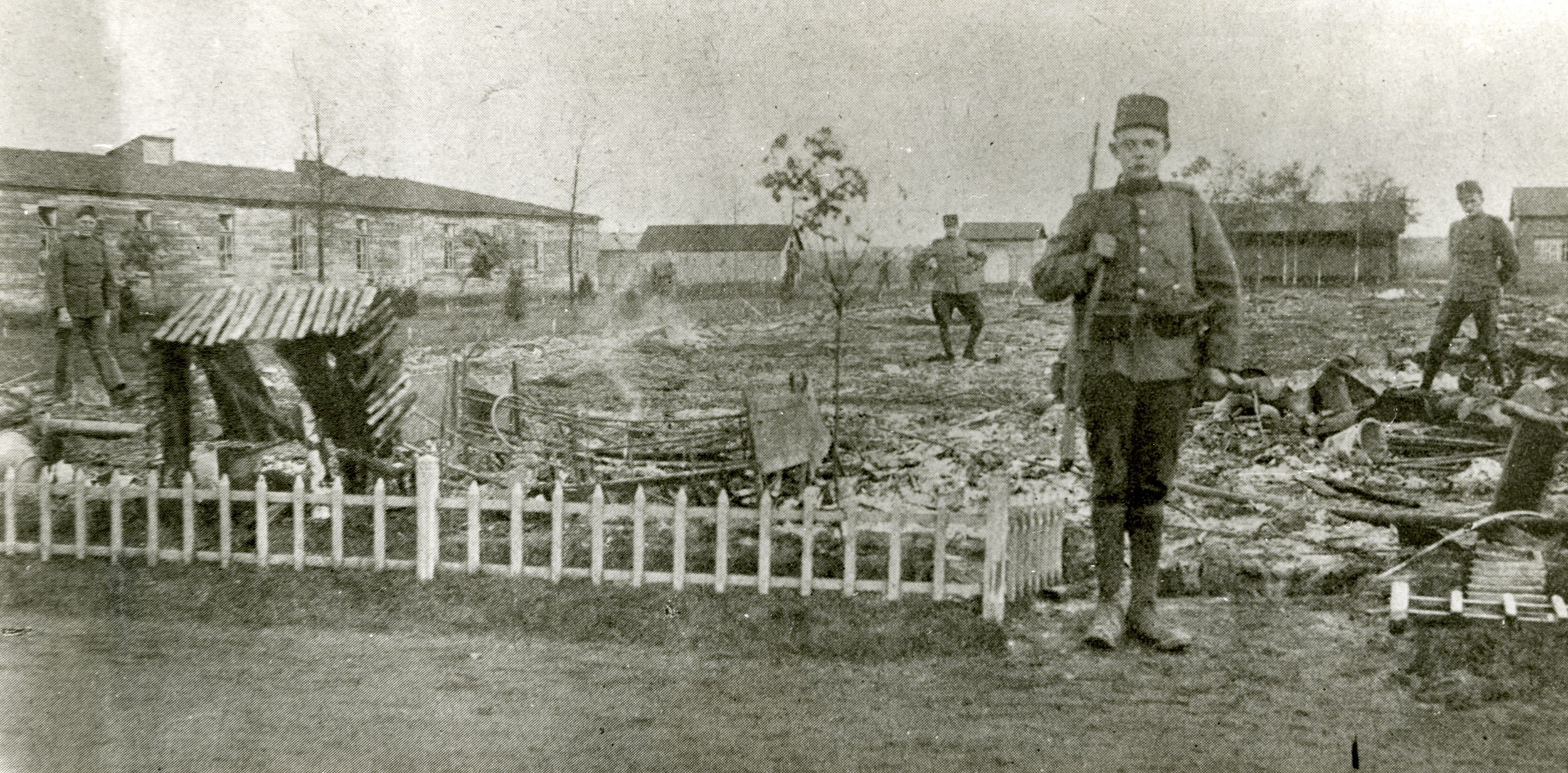
A burned-down barrack after the Harskamp riots

On 22 October 1918, Commander-in-Chief of the Land and Naval Forces Cornelis Jacobus Snijders requested the mobilisation of additional troops and the suspension of periodical leave, fearing that the German retreat from Belgium might lead some German forces to cross the border into Limburg. On 25 October 1918, soldiers at the Harskamp military camp rioted due to their conditions, particularly the withdrawal of leave. The riot was quickly suppressed, although some unrest spread to other military camps, raising concerns about the reliability of the army.

The relationship between Snijders and the cabinet was already bad when another conflict arose over the inquiry into the riots. The cabinet had wanted to fire him for a while, but the queen supported him and prevented his removal. The cabinet finally announced on 6 November that he would step down, after public support for his removal had grown.

== Events ==
=== Internal SDAP discussions ===
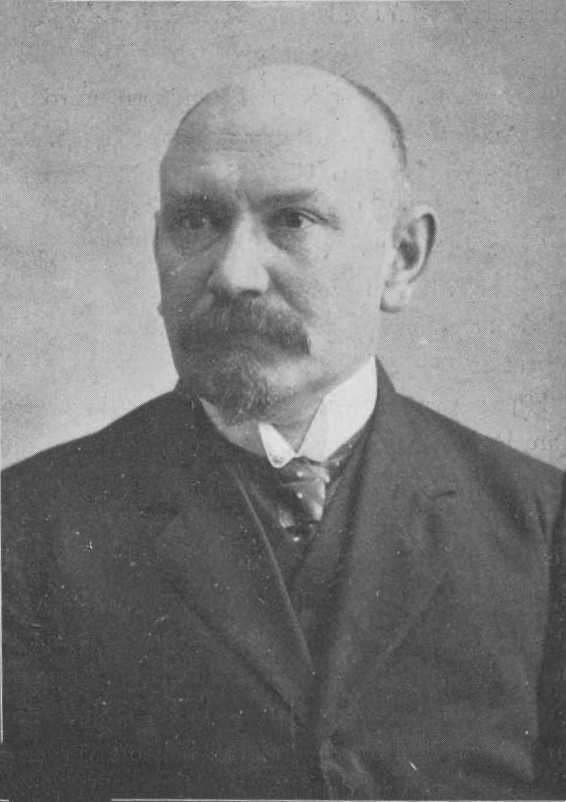
SDAP party chair Willem Vliegen

The SDAP board discussed the national and international events on 2 November. They discussed a manifesto about the events written by Troelstra for an upcoming party conference. The manifesto contained a call to revolution: "that we will accept the revolutionary situation here and in Europe as the basis for our further work". Troelstra no longer believed socialism could be realised by exclusively parliamentary means. Of those present, only Goswijn Sannes and Franc van der Goes supported his proposal. Most others believed it was nonsense to call the situation at that time in the Netherlands revolutionary. Some believed that if a revolutionary situation arose, the SDAP should lead it. Party chair Willem Vliegen called revolution in a democracy foolish and noted "I did not fight for 25 years for universal suffrage, only to abolish it a few months after its introduction."

They decided to meet again the next day with like-minded organisations, including the board of the Dutch Confederation of Trade Unions (NVV) and the editorial board of Het Volk. The trade union supported preparations for a revolutionary situation, but primarily to prevent a destabilising general strike. The other attendees mostly opposed revolutionary language. A meeting with the trade union for conscripts on the same day had also revealed that there was no revolutionary sentiment among conscripts. Consequently, they decided to have a small group$\wedge$including Troelstra, Amsterdam alderman Floor Wibaut and NVV leader Jan Oudegeest – rewrite the manifesto without the controversial passages. The version published on 4 November invited members to attend the conference on 24 November "to determine the stance that the proletariat must adopt in this great struggle".

During a debate about military policy on 5 November, Troelstra had requested Snijders removal. The fact that his removal was announced the next day, was celebrated as a victory for the SDAP. During the debate, Troelstra also said, without coordination with his party:

Are you standing firm? Do you not gradually feel, due to the events of recent times, that you are standing on a volcano? ... Do not forget, when the time comes that you can no longer keep your footing, other forces will come to take your place. Then the time of the bourgeois government system will be over, and the working class, the newly emerged power, will ask you to step down and leave the place that is rightfully hers. ... We are not your friends, we are your opponents, we are, if you will, your most bitter enemies.

Troelstra's revolutionary words initially received little attention. A demonstration in Amsterdam on 7 November led by SDP member Henriette Roland Holst was attended by only a few hundred people and was stopped by the police.

=== Plans for revolution in Rotterdam ===
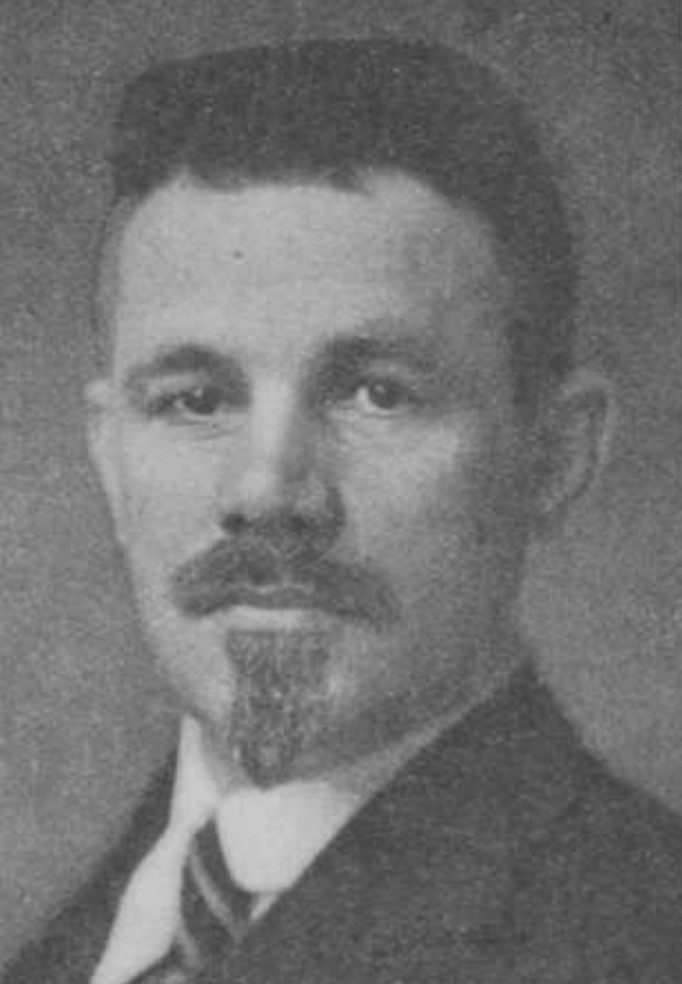
Arie de Zeeuw (1933 or before)

Troelstra's words received more attention after the German Emperor's abdication was announced on 9 November. The liberal leadership, who met with Prime Minister Charles Ruijs de Beerenbrouck on that day, thought that the revolution was unstoppable and that a few socialists should be included in the cabinet.

Fearing a revolution, the chair of the Rotterdam shipping association Paul Henricus Nijgh, who had always been open to dialogue with trade unions, met with trade unionists and SDAP municipal councillors Arie Heijkoop and Johan Brautigam to give the trade union more influence over working conditions. Rotterdam mayor Alfred Rudolph Zimmerman met with Heijkoop and Brautigam as well on the same day. Zimmerman believed the revolution would come to the Netherlands as well and wanted to cooperate with the SDAP to ensure a peaceful transition.

The next day, Troelstra met with Heijkoop and Brautigam, as well as MPs Goswijn Sannes and Willem Albarda, and local SDAP chair Arie de Zeeuw. Together, they devised a plan to initiate a revolution in Rotterdam, aiming to preempt a potential revolution in Amsterdam, where communist influence was stronger. In the afternoon, local SDAP and trade union leaders convened to discuss the plan, which included a list of demands and the proposal for a soldiers' council to assume control of the police, army, and postal services. However, several attendees, including MPs Jan ter Laan and Suze Groeneweg, opposed the plan, arguing that there were no indications of a revolution and that Nijgh and Zimmerman's stance did not suggest they would willingly transfer power. It was decided to review the plan further that evening with local and national leaders of the SDAP and NVV.

In the evening meeting, where at least 64 people were present, De Zeeuw and Troelstra received little support. Local politicians from Amsterdam also saw no revolutionary mood in the capital. The meeting decided that only a party conference could decide on a revolution. The party conference would be brought forward to 16 November. A commission led by Oudegeest would write a manifesto with demands. Troelstra, disappointed by the meeting, decided not to take part in the commission.

=== Demands for reform ===
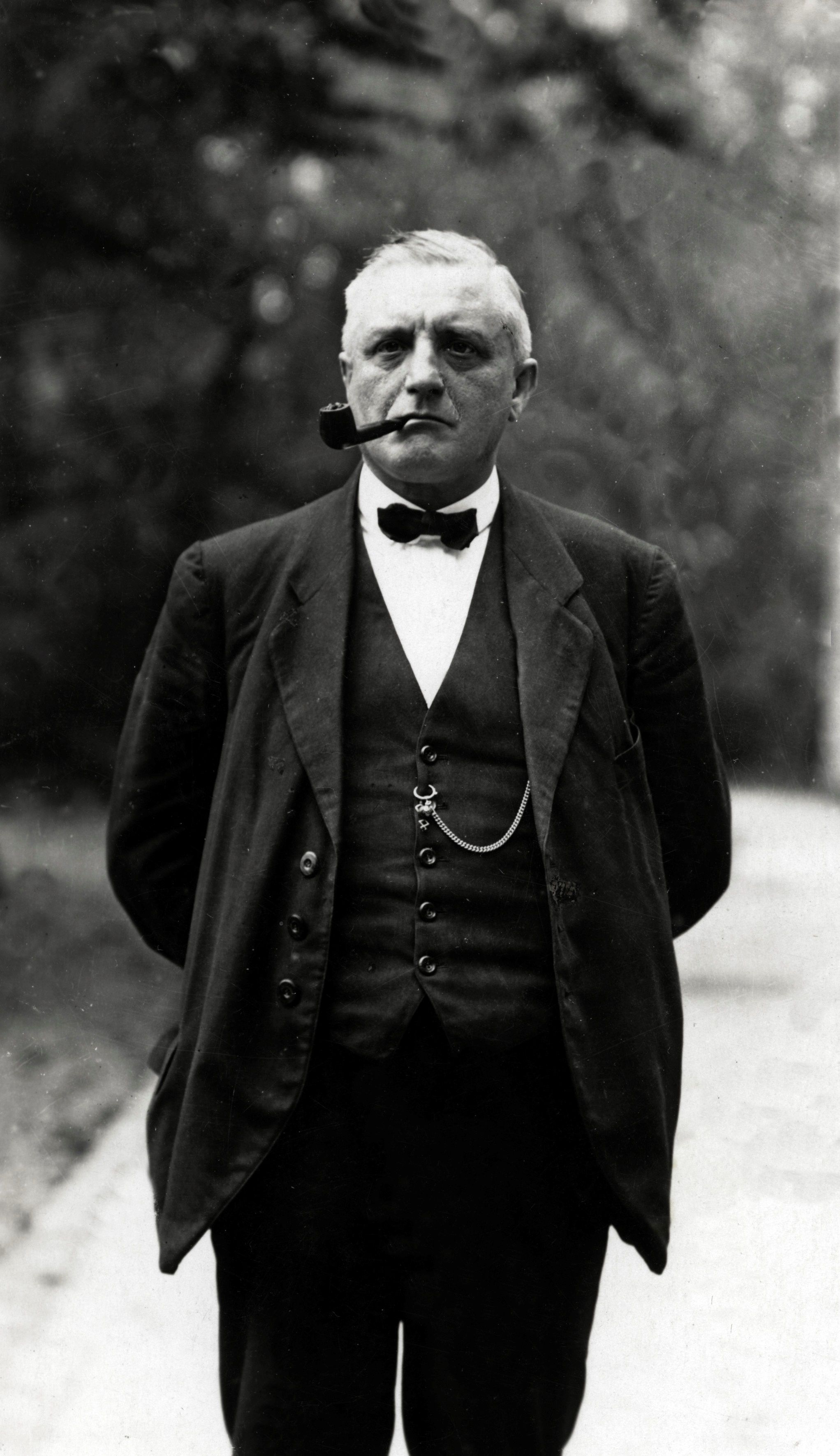
Co-founder of the SDAP, Jan Oudegeest

On 11 November, the commission led by Oudegeest published a list of 15 demands, which included immediate demobilisation, women's suffrage, abolishment of the Senate, eight-hour work days and state pensions at the age of 60. Troelstra said after reading it: "Such a program is a revolution". To which Oudegeest replied that they were reforms, not revolution. De Zeeuw's call for a constituent assembly for new state institutions was not included, nor did the manifesto call for the formation of workers' and soldiers' councils. The liberal Nieuwe Rotterdamsche Courant (NRC) called the demands "not unreasonable" the same day and even supported some reforms.

The Catholic and protestant unions kept supporting the cabinet, but also demanded reforms which they announced on 12 November. These demands partially overlapped with the social democrats, such as legal regulation of collective labor agreements, insurance against unemployment, illness, and incapacity for work, and state pensions.

=== Calls for revolution ===
On the evening of 11 November, meetings were held in Rotterdam, one of which included a speech by Troelstra. Inspired by NRC's positive commentary, Troelstra included revolutionary language in his speech: "Do not tarnish this great time with undignified actions; let it be said once and for all: the Dutch proletariat proved itself capable of its task, the Dutch proletarian revolution was the highlight in the history of the Netherlands!" While newspapers paid little attention to Troelstra's speech, SDAP leaders were concerned about its language. Before the parliamentary session on 12 November, Jan van den Tempel criticised Troelstra's speech in a parliamentary group meeting.

During the parliamentary session, Ruijs de Beerenbrouck officially announced the removal of Snijders and elaborated on the demobilsation which was announced the evening before. He also announced that the daily bread ration would be increased from 200 grams (7.1 oz) to 280 grams (9.9 oz). Ruijs de Beerenbrouck noted that violence would be disruptive to the food supply. In his reply, Troelstra argued that it was too late for small reforms or the increase of bread rations, and that the time had come for political power. In his hours-long speech he said:

I give you my word of honor – I speak on behalf of our entire party and the modern labor movement –: we must have nothing to do with violence. However, it is our duty to use this historic moment for the political elevation of the working class, and whatever personal dedication and self-sacrifice may be required of us, even if it should cost us our lives, we will gladly and jubilantly give it to fulfil the demands of this historic moment.

Despite Troelstra's claims that he spoke on behalf of his party, many of its MPs were shocked. Public criticism was only voiced by Henri Polak, but internally many party leaders criticised Troelstra's words. The party line remained to wait for the conference on 16 November.

=== Countermeasures ===
The Council of Ministers met after the debate. They decided not to give in to the SDAP's demands, although Minister of Justice Theo Heemskerk had proposed to compromise. The Catholic Minister of Labour Piet Aalberse, who had been supportive of social reforms, feared that concessions would make the government look weak and strengthen the revolution. A day later Ruijs de Beerenbrouck nevertheless announced the introduction of women's suffrage, which was celebrated by Het Volk as a concession. In the House of Representatives, there was also great willingness to meet a number of demands from the SDAP. Parties emphasised that this was a matter of democratic politics, and not under the pressure of a revolution.

The cabinet reinforced troops in The Hague, Rotterdam and Amsterdam, the only places where they expected riots. They mobilised the voluntary Landsturm, which were brought to these cities from all across the country. Minister of Finance Simon de Vries Czn was sent to Rotterdam, to prevent Zimmerman from capitulating.

Already on 7 November, Carel Gerretson and Horace van Gybland Oosterhoff, two private secretaries of Bataafse Petroleum Maatschappij CEO and prominent ARP member Hendrikus Colijn, sent a note to CHU leader Alexander de Savornin Lohman urging the government to take precautions against a possible revolution. This note was forwarded to the Minister of War, George August Alexander Alting von Geusau. They had been early advocates for the mobilisation of the voluntary Landsturm. Meanwhile, they had formed their own political and military groups, maintaining contact with the authorities throughout the Red Week.

The Catholics also organised. The Catholic labour leader in Limburg, Henri Poels, organised vigilance committees.

=== Violence in Amsterdam ===
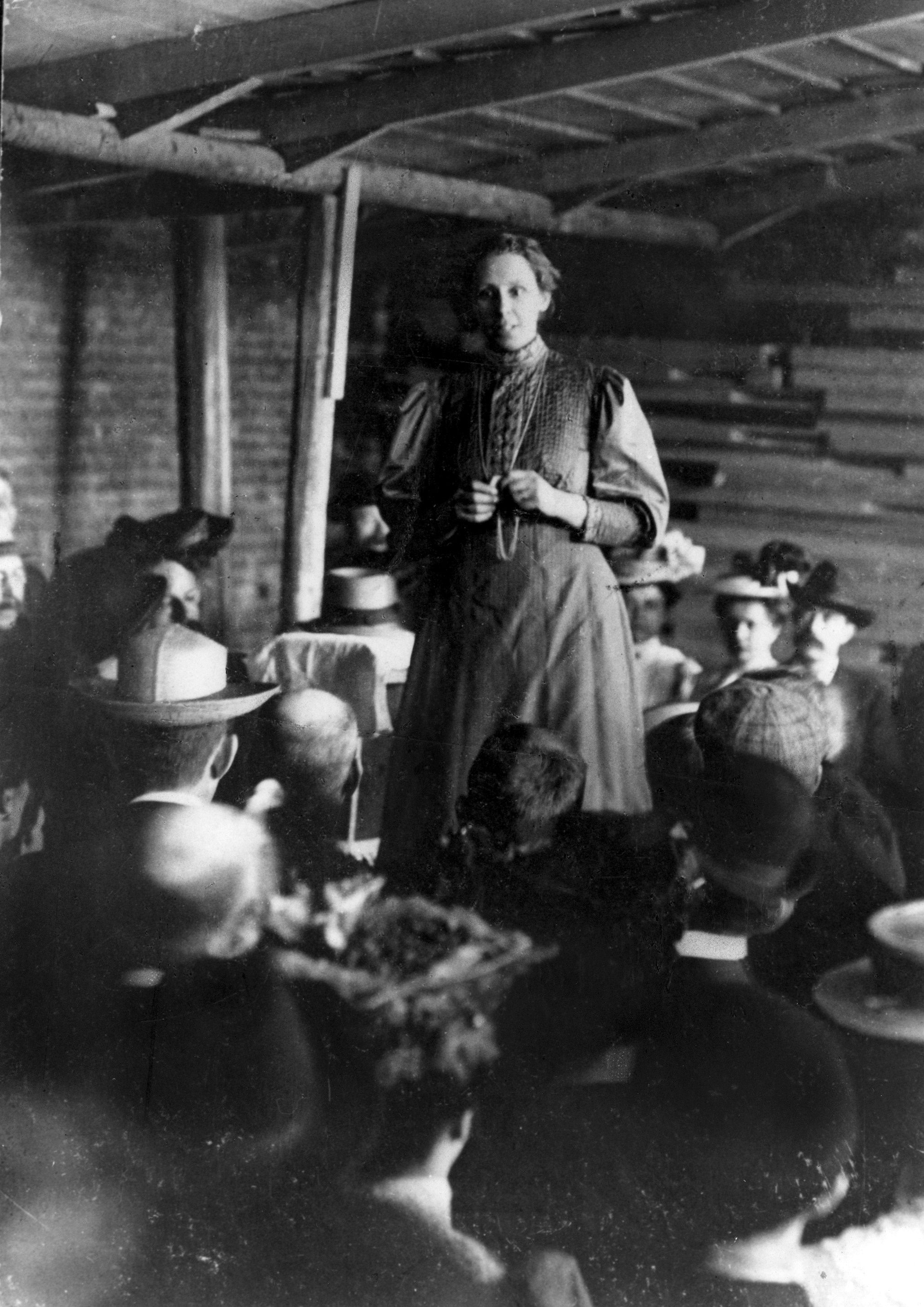
Henriette Roland Holst speaking at an event (1909)

The Revolutionary Socialist Committee, a collaboration of extreme left organisations dominated by the SDP, convened on the afternoon of 13 November at Nieuwe Achtergracht 140 in Amsterdam. Speakers included Roland Holst and the anarchist preacher Nicolaas Jacob Cornelis Schermerhorn. During the meeting, a group of soldiers entered and pledged their support for a revolution. (Note: Reports in newspapers varied on the number of soldiers present, citing figures ranging from 8 to 400.) Afterward, the participants held a demonstration which was dispersed by mounted police.

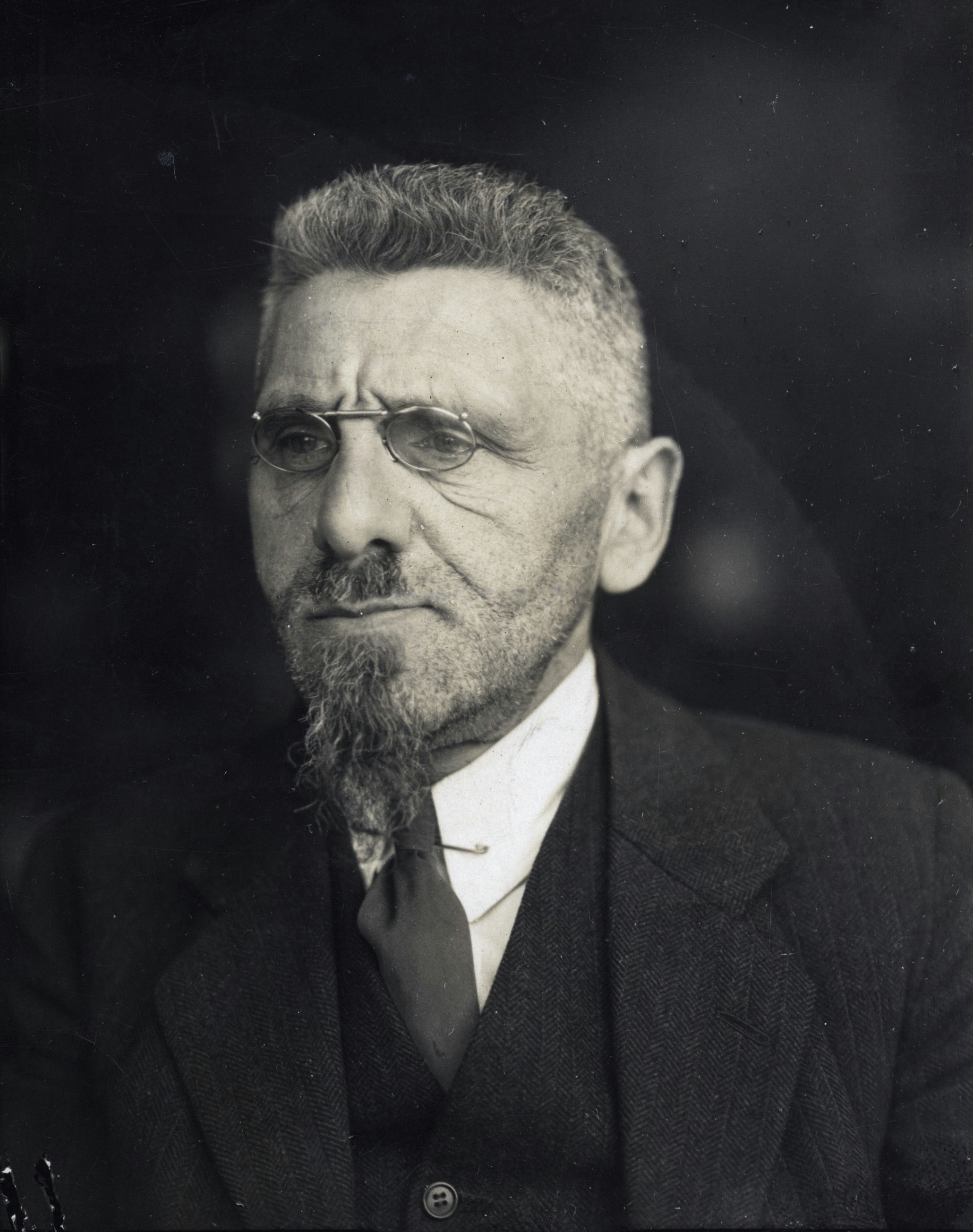
David Wijnkoop (around 1935)

In the evening, the organisations met in the Diamantbeurs in Amsterdam. Former leader of the SDB, Ferdinand Domela Nieuwenhuis, was also present. After this event, they held a demonstration led by Roland Holst, Wijnkoop and leader of the League of Christian Socialists Willy Kruyt. They walked towards the Amsterdam Cavalry Barracks on Sarphatistraat, where they sang and tried to convince the soldiers to join them. A group of anarchists meanwhile tried to enter the barracks by smashing the lock of the gate with an axe. After they had succeeded, lights were turned on at the gate and the gendarmerie opened fire. Four protesters died and sixteen were wounded.

A part of the demonstration then moved to the nearby Oranje-Nassau Kazerne, where soldiers were ordered to fire if protesters wanted to enter. In front of the gate, Roland Holst held a speech, while according to stories, Wijnkoop fainted from shock and asked bystanders for a glass of water. The protest continued to Beursplein, where Wijnkoop called for a general strike and for workers to meet the next morning on Damrak.

That same evening, the SDAP organised two meetings in Amsterdam, one in the Concertgebouw and another in Theater Bellevue. Politicians, including Polak and Vliegen, called for non-violence and warned of scenes like those in Russia. After the SDAP meetings, the social democrats planned to demonstrate. However, upon learning of violence occurring in another part of the city, they ended their demonstration.

When Wijnkoop arrived at Damrak the next day, fewer than 20 people were present. Soldiers' councils were created in some places, but undertook nothing significant.

=== Troelstra backtracks ===
The SDAP held meetings throughout the country where they used radical but not revolutionary language. In the morning of 14 November, the parliamentary group wanted Troelstra to distance himself from calls for revolution, which he refused. However, during a debate in the afternoon Troelstra replied to accusations from other parties:

The word 'coup' was not used by me at all. The gentlemen have spent a few days getting worked up about representations that in no way correspond to what I explicitly said in this House ... I explicitly said several times in my speech that I do not want to know about violence.

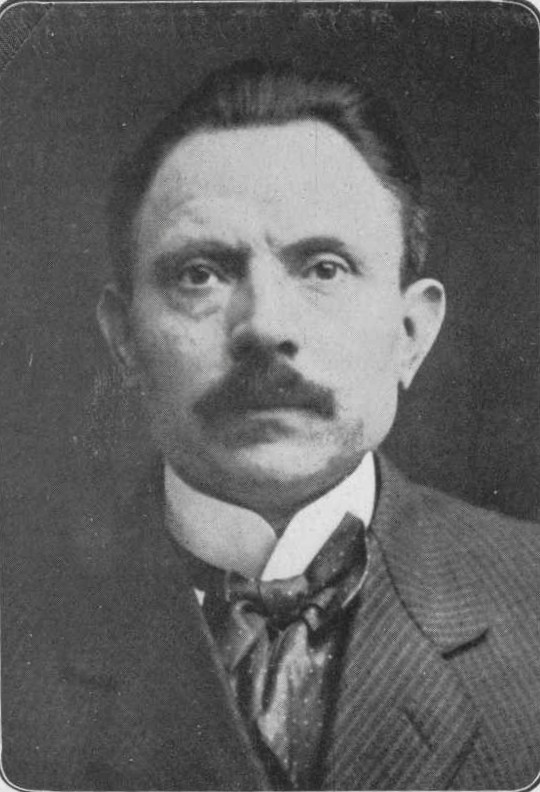
SDAP MP Jan Schaper

The next day, SDAP MP Jan Schaper was tasked with damage control in a debate. He downplayed the most radical statements by Troelstra and emphasised SDAP's democratic character, without abandoning his party leader.

During the party conference in Rotterdam on 16 and 17 November, most speakers made it clear that they did not want a revolution, but they maintained their demands for reform. At times, speakers criticised Troelstra's actions. Troelstra himself was absent in an effort to maintain party unity. However, a telegram was sent on the first day urging him to attend, which he did on the second day, receiving a warm welcome with applause. In his speech, he acknowledged that he had misjudged the power dynamics but stated that he had never intended to seize power through violence or terrorism, against the will of the majority. The conference concluded in the afternoon in a calm and orderly manner.

=== Orange Monday ===
On the last day of the SDAP conference, Queen Wilhelmina visited a church service in the Willemskerk, The Hague. The attendees spontaneously sang the Wilhelmus after the service, and upon arrival at Noordeinde Palace, she and her family were cheered. In the afternoon, more than 40,000 joined a rally at Houtrust Sports Park organised by Catholic organisations opposing the revolution.

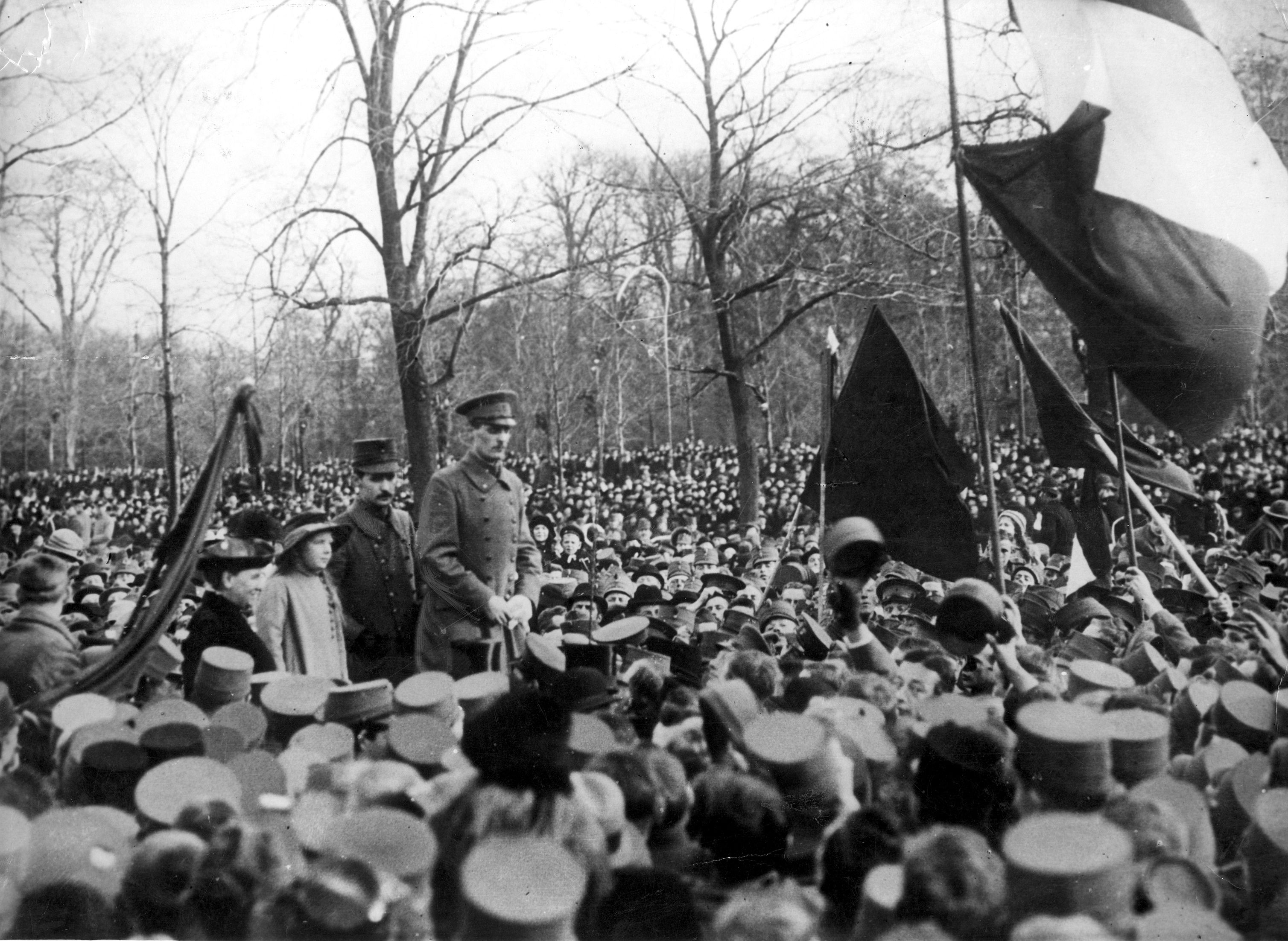
Queen Wilhelmina and her daughter, Princess Juliana at Malieveld on Orange Monday

The next day – 'Orange Monday' (Dutch: Oranjemaandag) – it became clear that there would be no revolution. A demonstration was organised by a group of loyal soldiers on Malieveld to celebrate not only the failure of the revolution, but also the end of the war. The mayor, Jacob Adriaan Patijn, called on all the residents of the city to come. Queen Wilhelmina and her daughter, Princess Juliana, made a tour through The Hague in the royal carriage. When they arrived at Malieveld, the horses were replaced by a group of soldiers, who pulled the carriage through the mass of people. In the weeks after, Wilhelmina toured through the country where she was met with cheers.

== Aftermath ==
Troelstra's mistake enlarged differences between the SDAP and other parties. The board of the ABRK wanted to prohibit government cooperation with the SDAP in 1922, which was changed to only in "utmost necessity" by its parliamentary leader Willem Hubert Nolens (the so-called Nolens Doctrine). The SDAP would therefore not govern for the first time until 1939.

The Central Intelligence Services (CI) was established in 1919 in response to the Red Week. In its early years, it focused on anarchists and communists. The following year, an anti-revolution law was also enacted. Preparatory actions for a revolutionary act were forbidden, including maintaining contacts with foreign countries if it involved preparing for a 'revolution within the empire in Europe.'
