= John Ricus Couperus =

Dutch lawyer (1816–1902)

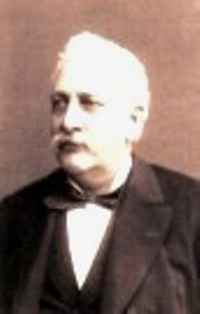
- John Ricus Couperus
- Born: 24 February 1816; Batavia, Dutch East Indies
- Died: 13 October 1902 (aged 86); The Hague, Netherlands
- Occupations: member of the Council of Justice in Padang and member of the High Military Court of the Dutch East Indies.
- Years active: 1837–1860

John Ricus Couperus (1816 – 1902) was a Dutch lawyer, member of the Council of Justice in Padang, member of the High Military Court of the Dutch East Indies and the landheer of Tjikopo. He was also the father of the Dutch writer Louis Couperus and knight in the Order of the Netherlands Lion.

== Biography ==
=== Youth ===
Born into the Indo landed gentry of the Indies on both sides of his family, Couperus was a son of Petrus Theodorus Couperus (1787–1823), the landheer or lord of the private domain (particuliere land) of Tjikopo in Java, and Catharina Rica Cranssen (1795–1845). He was a paternal grandson of Abraham Couperus (1752-1813), Governor of Malacca, and Willem Jacob Cranssen (1762-1821), Governor of Ambon. After the early death of his father his mother remarried general Carel Jan Riesz (1791–1865), who was komtur in the Military William Order and was active during the Battle of Waterloo and during military campaigns in the Dutch East Indies. When Couperus was three years old he and his brothers Henry (5 years old) and Piet (4 years old) were sent to the Netherlands, accompanied by friends of their parents (October 20, 1819). In the Netherlands Couperus was placed under guardianship of a merchant in Amsterdam, called I.W. Bagman, who placed Couperus at the home of C.G. Merkus, a preacher of the Walloon church in Dordrecht. Later this family moved to Amsterdam. In 1826 Couperus was sent to a boarding school in Noordwijk, later in Maarssen. In May 1829 his stepfather, who with his wife had returned to the Netherlands, was appointed colonel in the Dutch East Indian Army and moved with his wife back to Batavia. Couperus was sent to the vicar Koorders and became a student at the Athenaeum Illustre of Amsterdam in 1832.

Couperus was also active as a composer in his youth as well as later in his life; during his time at the Athenaeum Illustre of Amsterdam he visited the French opera, played the piano, sang and took lessons in harmony and composition. He also founded a music group, "Musicae Artis Sacrum". In 1837 two of his compositions, Passy, Paroles de Béranger and Bitte zum Amor were published at C.J. Reinhold jr. (Amsterdam); He also made compositions for family use only and wrote poetry, including but not limited to: Illusions d'un Étudiant and Sea Thoughts (written while on his way to the Dutch East Indies in 1837). Two musical compositions are preserved, Rêverie d’un Grandpère and the Influenza Walse.

=== Career as a lawyer ===
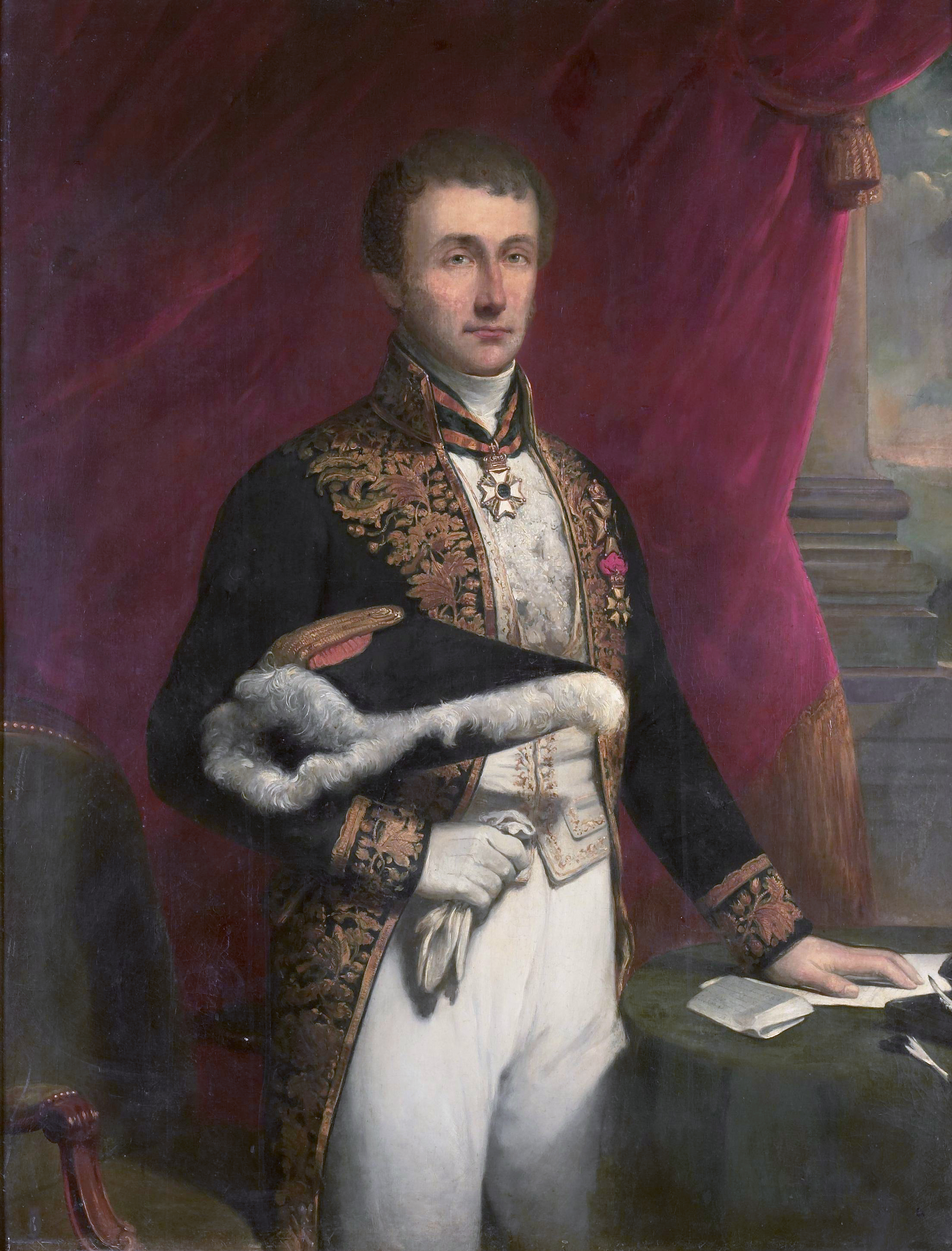
Pieter Merkus (1787–1844), acting Governor-General of the Dutch East Indies had great influence on Couperus

Couperus studied law at the University of Leiden, where he achieved his Master of Laws. He received his PhD on the thesis De conditione servorum apud romanos (Concerning the condition of slaves in the Roman Empire); during this period of his life, acting Governor-General of the Dutch East Indies Pieter Merkus (1787–1844) had great influence on Couperus. The Governor-General was, in fact, Couperus' uncle by marriage as the husband of his aunt, Wilhelmina Nicolasina Cranssen, the legitimated daughter of his maternal grandfather by a native, Ambonese mistress. Couperus left for the Dutch East Indies in 1837 and arrived in November 1837 by steamboat Castor from Batavia at Surabaya. On 1 January 1838 he was appointed tax official in this town. On 20 September 1839 he was made available to the Governmental Commissioner (Pieter Merkus, who then was appointed government commissioner at the Westcoast of Sumatra). In October 1839 Couperus joined the military campaign against Kota Gedang, which was commanded by general Andreas Victor Michiels. He was appointed official ("controleur") third class in April 1840 and was allocated to the Department of Rural Income and Cultures. By Royal Decree of 22 April 1842 Couperus was appointed senior civil officer and appointed secretary and revenue assistant at the court in the Batavia Department. In the position of legal assistant in October 1844 Couperus was placed at the Court of Justice in Padang and also appointed as an official for military affairs. During the time Couperus spent at Padang, he lived in a house at an intersection of three roads, between Padang and Pau. Here he was an eyewitness to a fight where part of an infantry platoon was attacked by a large group of armed natives and killed. Padang was called to a state of emergency and in his position as an official of military affairs Couperus ordered an investigation. It seemed that local people were revolting due to priests who were putting them up against the Dutch government. Additional military troops were ordered and arrived in time to beat the revolt.

In a brochure Couperus wrote about the Dutch presence in the Dutch East Indies: Life for the Dutch in the Indies is not just living like a farmer but also living on the basis of "le droit du plus fort" (the right of the strongest). This situation can only be controlled by a moral and military dominance. It is a domination which places the weaker in an unnatural position and makes it impossible to apply the unconstrained usual Dutch politics in the Dutch East Indies. In August 1846 Couperus was appointed as a member of the Court of Justice in Batavia. In November Couperus temporarily replaced D.A. Junius van Hemert as a tax official in the Western Department of the Dutch East Indies and in May 1848 he was appointed member at the Board of Justice (Raad van Justitie) in Batavia. Couperus was appointed court clerk at the supreme court of the Dutch East Indies in April 1849 and in December 1850 promoted to the position of counselor at the supreme court. In May 1854 he was also appointed member of the supreme court (until July 1859) and obtained a leave for two years to Europe in February 1860. Back in the Netherlands Couperus was appointed knight in the Order of the Netherlands Lion. He was honorably discharged as counselor of the Supreme Court in June 1862 (Royal Order of 23 June 1862 number 51).

=== Politics ===
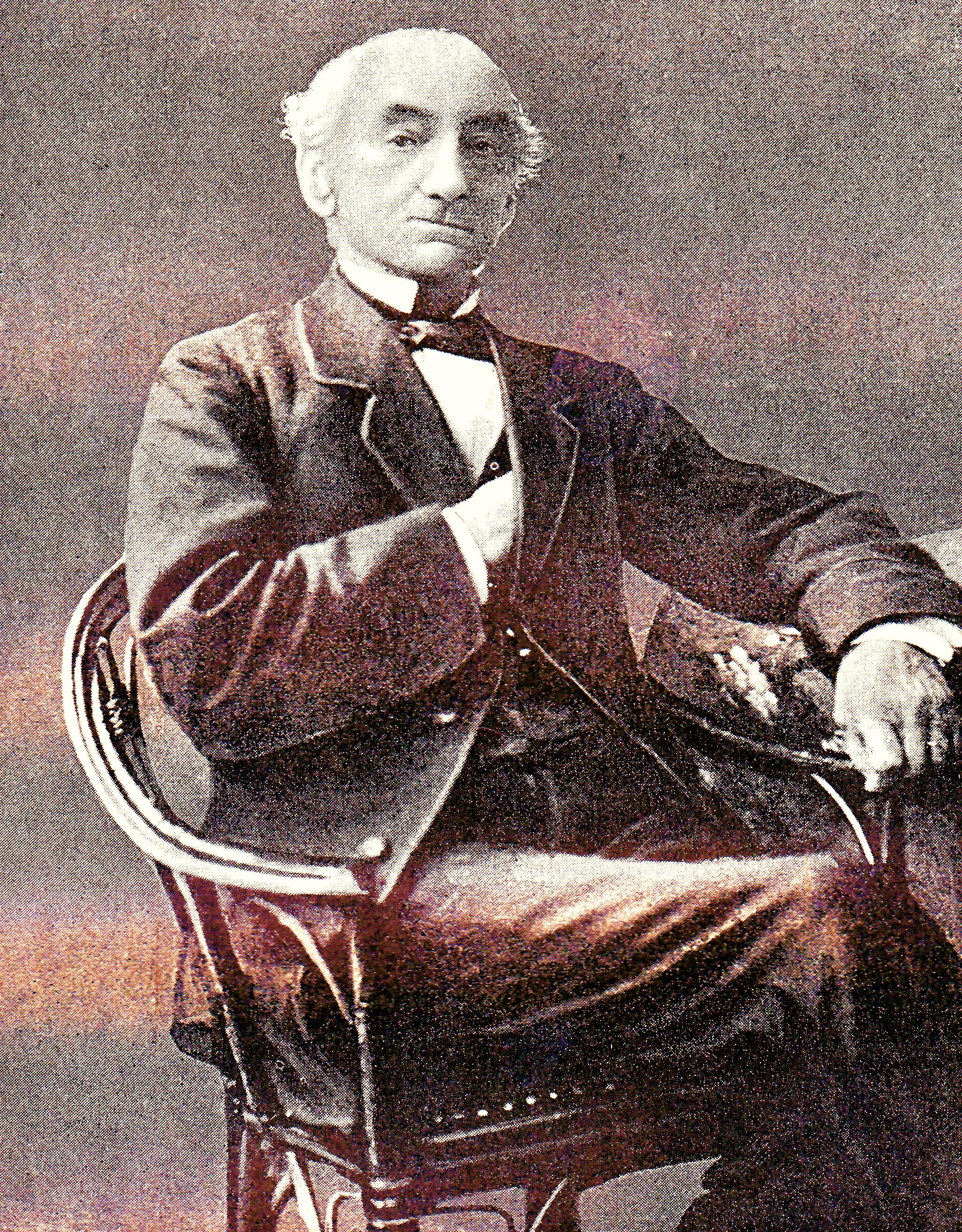
Brother-in-law and former Minister of Dutch Colonies Guillaume Louis Baud, with whom Couperus discussed politics

Couperus and his family travelled to Europe in 1860. They visited Egypt, Marseille, Paris and Brussels on their way to the Netherlands. They settled at the Prinsengracht 4 (7 November 1860) and later moved to Mauritskade 11. Here Couperus wrote a brochure, called Een woord ter gelegenheid der op handen zijnde ontmoeting der oud Gouverneurs-Generaal J.J. Rochussen en Mr. A.J. Duijmaer van Twist op het veld van vrijen arbeid (a contribution on the occasion of the meeting between former Governor-Generals J.J. Rochussen and mr. Albertus Jacobus Duymaer van Twist about free labour). Couperus wrote his brochure on the occasion of the session of the House of Representatives, held 15, 16 and 17 October 1860, where the issue of the regulation of the sugar industry was discussed. Mr. Duymaer van Twist declared here that he wanted to reconsider free labour and free industry. In his brochure Couperus intended to give legal guidelines according to which the transition into free labour and free industry should take place. He also resisted the broad discussions that took place, where the way to follow was, in his view, already recorded in these legal guidelines. Couperus wrote: To what extent will both former Governor-Generals remain into the limits of the already described legal laws? Will they not exceed the regulations? Will they not, as previously seen, prefer their personal views on this subject above the law? He also wrote that the Dutch government only had the objective to terminate the Cultivation System and to proceed with free labour when was proven that by means of five purification measures, determined by the government, and applied during a slow transition state, the Cultivation System was no longer maintainable and inefficient. He ordered a strict and rigorous application of the rules and strict control by the government and rejected a more loose approach, where things such as mutual agreements regarding landownership by natives were no longer clear. This landownership by natives and revision of laws regarding landownership were very important during the transition state into a new economic system.

Couperus wrote in 1870 the brochure De agrarische wet van den minister de Waal, en hare toepassing volgens Fransen van de Putte, ter vierschare gebragt voor de eerste kamer der staten-generaal (the agrarian law of minister Engelbertus de Waal and the use of it according to Isaäc Dignus Fransen van de Putte, submitted to the Senate). He wrote it because a law was introduced, the Agrarian Law of 1870, that was intended to form the legal basis of a system of free cultures in which the private entrepreneur would be leading. In his brochure Couperus rejected this law (which, at that time, already was accepted by the House of Representatives). He wrote: The agriculture grounds which natives at the moment have in hereditary individual use will be given to them at their request! He called this a "chimerical utopia": It will be the end to all private land ownership. In the appendix he wrote: Against the vague and indeterminate of this law it is impossible to fight. There were several reasons why Couperus returned to the Dutch East Indies in 1872 but the consequences of the Agricultural Law of 1870 on his own property were among them. Couperus discussed many of his concerns about his property with his brother-in-law Guillaume Louis Baud (a far relative of Governor-General Jean Chrétien Baud), who was active as Minister of Dutch Colonies in 1848. In his brochures Couperus called Baud an example of the ultra-conservative party who was willing to improve the culture system but who was also determined to maintain it.

=== Last part of his life ===
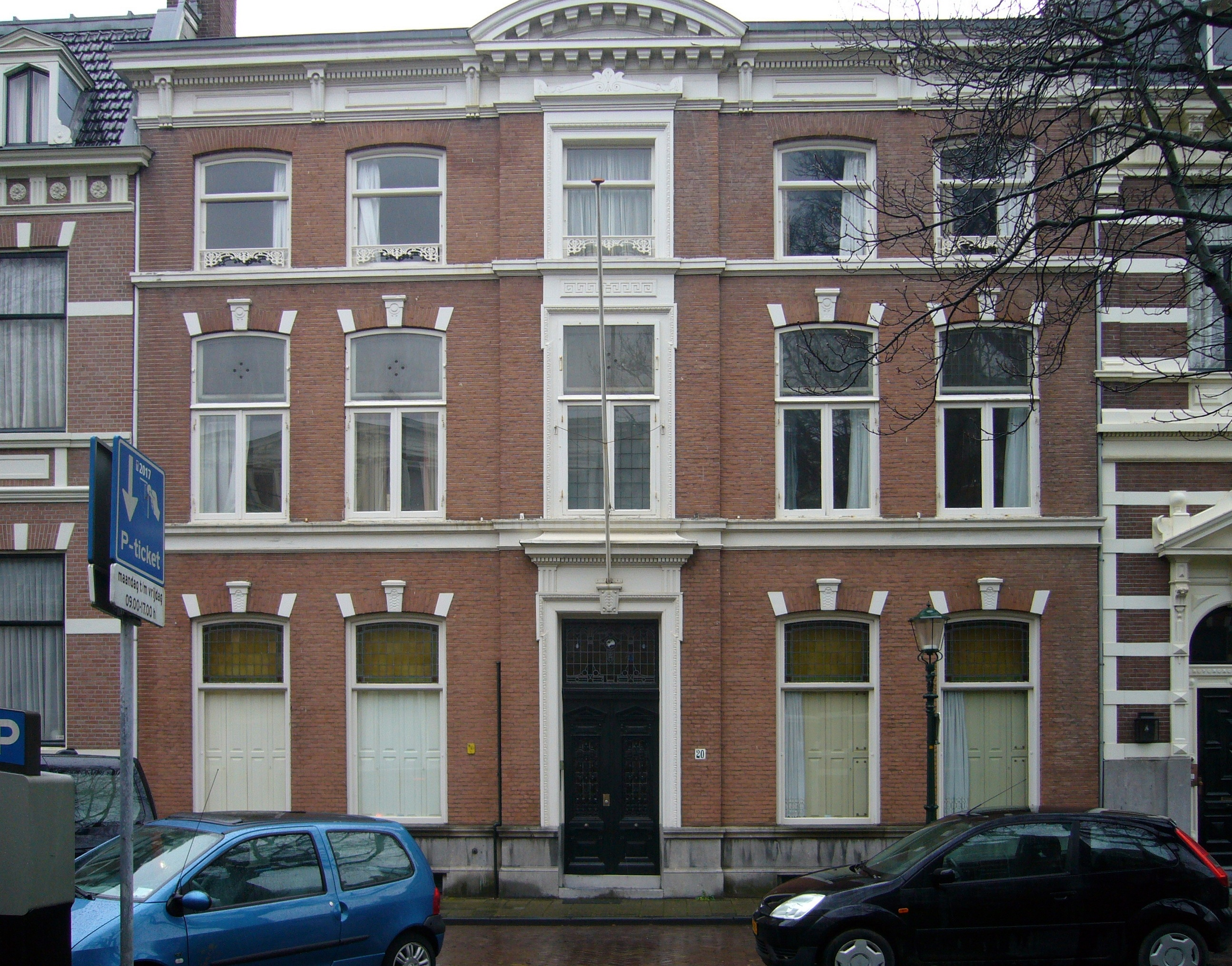
From 1884 until 1902 Couperus lived at Surinamestraat 20, The Hague

Couperus and his family travelled back to the Dutch East Indies by steamboat Prins Hendrik on 7 November 1872 (Couperus, his wife, four sons (including Louis Couperus) and two daughters). The family first settled in Batavia (Koningsplein) while Couperus took the supervision over Tjicoppo, the family estate near Buitenzorg. In the summer of 1878 the Couperus family returned to the Netherlands by steamboat; they settled at Nassaukade 4 in The Hague. In 1883 it was decided to sell the family property of Tjicoppo; with his part of the profits in hand Couperus gave order to build the house at Surinamestraat 20, The Hague. Here, the son of Couperus, Louis Couperus, wrote between 1887 and 1888 his best known novel Eline Vere.

At 15 February 1893 the wife of Couperus, Catharina Geertruida Couperus-Reynst, died at the age of 64. Around this time Couperus wrote a family history, which he ended with the words: Keep your eyes on the past and see to it that the future will never ashame us. According to Henri van Booven Couperus felt that his end was near in the summer of 1902. On 13 October 1902 publisher L.J. Veen received a letter from Louis Couperus, in which he stated that he resided in The Hague because his father was dying. Couperus died that same day and was buried on 15 October 1902 at the general cemetery in The Hague, next to his wife. His house at Surinamestraat 20 was later bought by lawyer and member of the House of Representatives Conrad Theodor van Deventer.

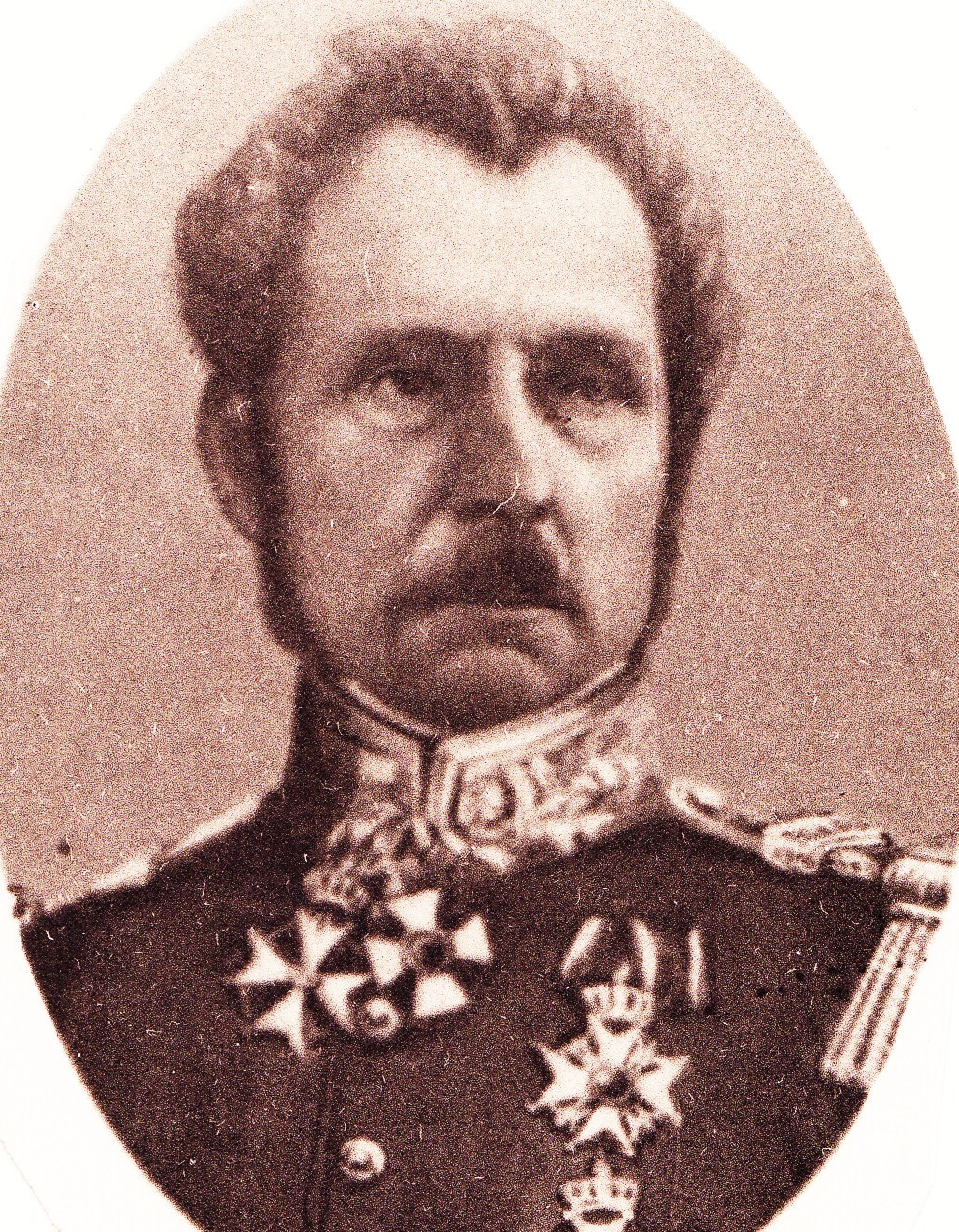
General Carel Jan Riesz (1791–1865) was the stepfather of Couperus

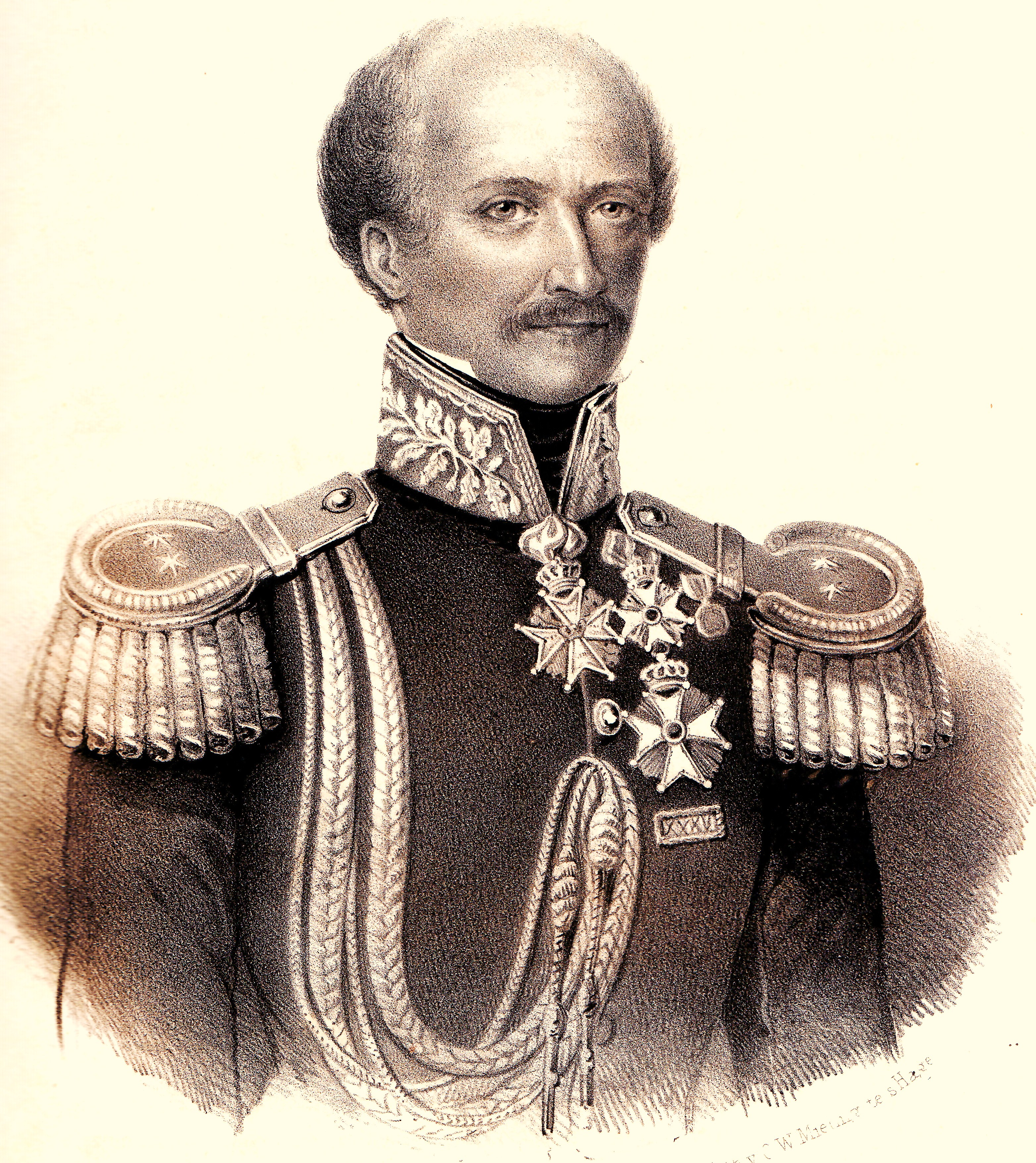
Couperus joined general Andreas Victor Michiels during his military campaign of 1838 in Sumatra

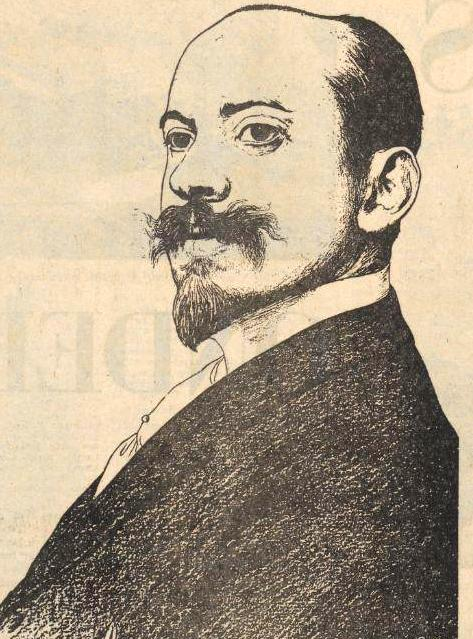
Couperus was the father of writer Louis Couperus

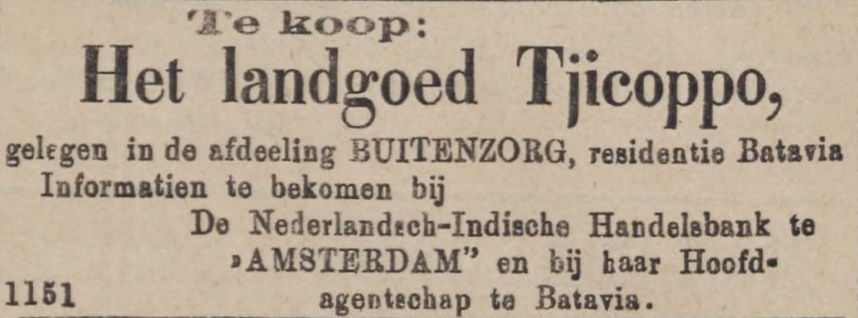
Advertisement by which Couperus tried to sell the estate Tjicoppo

== Works ==
- Dissertatio historico-juridica inauguralis de conditione Servorum apud Romanos. Amsterdam, 1837 (thesis)
- Een woord ter gelegenheid der op handen zijnde ontmoeting der oud Gouverneurs-Generaal J.J. Rochussen en Mr. A.J. Duijmaer van Twist op het veld van vrijen arbeid. 's-Gravenhage, 1860
- De geest van artikel 110 van het Nederlandsch-Indisch regerings-reglement, beschouwd als wettelijke grondslag voor de aanstaande Indische drukpers-wet. 's-Gravenhage, 1862
- Gouvernements-cultures met of zonder stelsel? 's-Gravenhage, 1863
- De agrarische wet van den minister de Waal, en hare toepassing volgens Fransen van de Putte, ter vierschare gebragt voor de eerste kamer der staten-generaal. H.C. Susan. The Hague. 1870
