= Alexander Voormolen =

Dutch composer

Alexander Nicolaas Voormolen
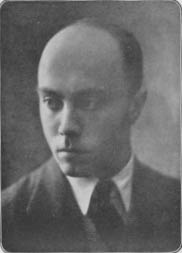
- Portrait, c. 1923
- Born: 3 March 1895; Rotterdam, The Netherlands
- Died: 12 November 1980 (aged 85); Leidschendam, The Netherlands
- Occupations: Composer; music critic; librarian
- Spouses: Marcelle Henriette Chouillet (1918–1920); Alice Clifford Grierson (1928–unknown

Alexander Nicolaas Voormolen (3 March 1895 – 12 November 1980) was a Dutch composer.

== Family ==
Voormolen was the son of Alieda/Aleida Maria Wentholt (distant family of Jean-Philippe Rameau) and the Rotterdam chief of police Willem Voormolen, who died when Alexander was fourteen (1909). His mother died in 1913, when he was 18. In 1918, he married Marcelle Henriette Chouillet, the daughter of a minister; a divorce followed two years later. In 1928, he married Alice Clifford Grierson (portraited by Isaac Israels in the 1920s), daughter of Herbert John Clifford Grierson, professor of English literature at the University of Edinburgh. This marriage also did not last long, as she remarried to physician Frederik van Nouhuijs in 1934. In later years, he became friends with singer/singing teacher Titi Fermin (1903–1994), daughter of concert singer Adelin Fermin and pupil of Berthe Seroen. Voormolen died in the Prinsenhof nursing home in Leidschendam after a long illness. He was cremated at the Ockenburgh Crematorium in The Hague. His daughter from his second marriage, Alice Lucie Adrienne Voormolen, was the goddaughter of Lucie van Dam van Isselt and worked for many years as a secretary at the Netherlands Red Cross.

== Education ==
Voormolen studied piano with Willem and Marinus Petri and composition with Johan Wagenaar at the Toonkunst Musical Academy in Utrecht. His classmates included Willem Pijper and Jacob van Domselaer. He went to Paris in 1915 at the invitation of conductor Rhené-Bâton (who had conducted Voormolen's piece Prelude at the Kurhaus in 1916), where he studied with Albert Roussel and met Maurice Ravel and Frederick Delius, among others.

== Activities ==
He returned to the Netherlands in 1919 and settled in Veere, later in The Hague from 1923. He was a music reviewer at the Nieuwe Rotterdamsche Courant and librarian of the Royal Conservatory of The Hague for many years.

== Compositions ==
Understandably, Voormolen was initially mainly influenced by French impressionism. Later, more Dutch influences were noticeable, for instance in his compositions Tableaux des Pays-Bas, two "children's books" (1920 and 1924), both Baron Hop suites (1924 and 1931, inspired by 18th-century court life in The Hague) and the Pastorale for oboe and string orchestra (1940). Voormolen was an admirer of Louis Couperus. He composed a number of orchestral works inspired by Couperus, such as Eline (1957, from Eline Vere) and the Kleine Haagse suite (1939). The Canzone from the oboe concert was used as a tune for the Dutch TV show De kleine zielen, based on Couperus' novel (De boeken der kleine zielen. De kleine zielen). Finally, the influence of Max Reger and Anton Bruckner can be heard in later works, such as the Sinfonia Concertante (1951) and the Ciacona e fuga (1958).

He dedicated his Manchmal geschieht es in tiefer Nacht (poem by Rainer Maria Rilke) to Lien Korter, and his work Madrigal (1969) to singer Elisabeth Cooymans. His works were performed by major orchestras. For example, the Royal Concertgebouw Orchestra performed Sinfonia under the direction of Willem Mengelberg; this combination also gave performances of De drie ruitertjes and Baron Hop-suite nr. 2. Voormolen also conducted the orchestra himself four times, one of which included a performance of his Concerto for two oboes with Haakon Stotijn and Jaap Stotijn as soloists. The work was also performed in the same combination under the baton of Eduard van Beinum, Willem Mengelberg, Hein Jordans and Jean Fournet. Voormolen's works were performed at 39 of that orchestra's concerts. The Residentie Orchestra, conducted by Willem van Otterloo, and the Radio Symphony Orchestra, conducted by Henk Spruit, also performed his work.

Voormolen destroyed several of his works after World War II, including the aforementioned Sinfonia.

== Awards and honors ==
In 1932, Voormolen received the Muziekprijs ("Music Prize") from the municipality of The Hague for his Air Willem V. In 1961, he received the Johan Wagenaarprijs for his entire oeuvre, and the Visser Neerlandiaprijs for Three songs on British verse (1948). In 1976, he received the Penning van de Rotte from the municipality of Rotterdam. In 1978, he was awarded the honorary membership of the Haagse Kunstkring.
