= Surinamestraat 20, The Hague =

Coordinates: 52°5′23″N 4°18′27″E

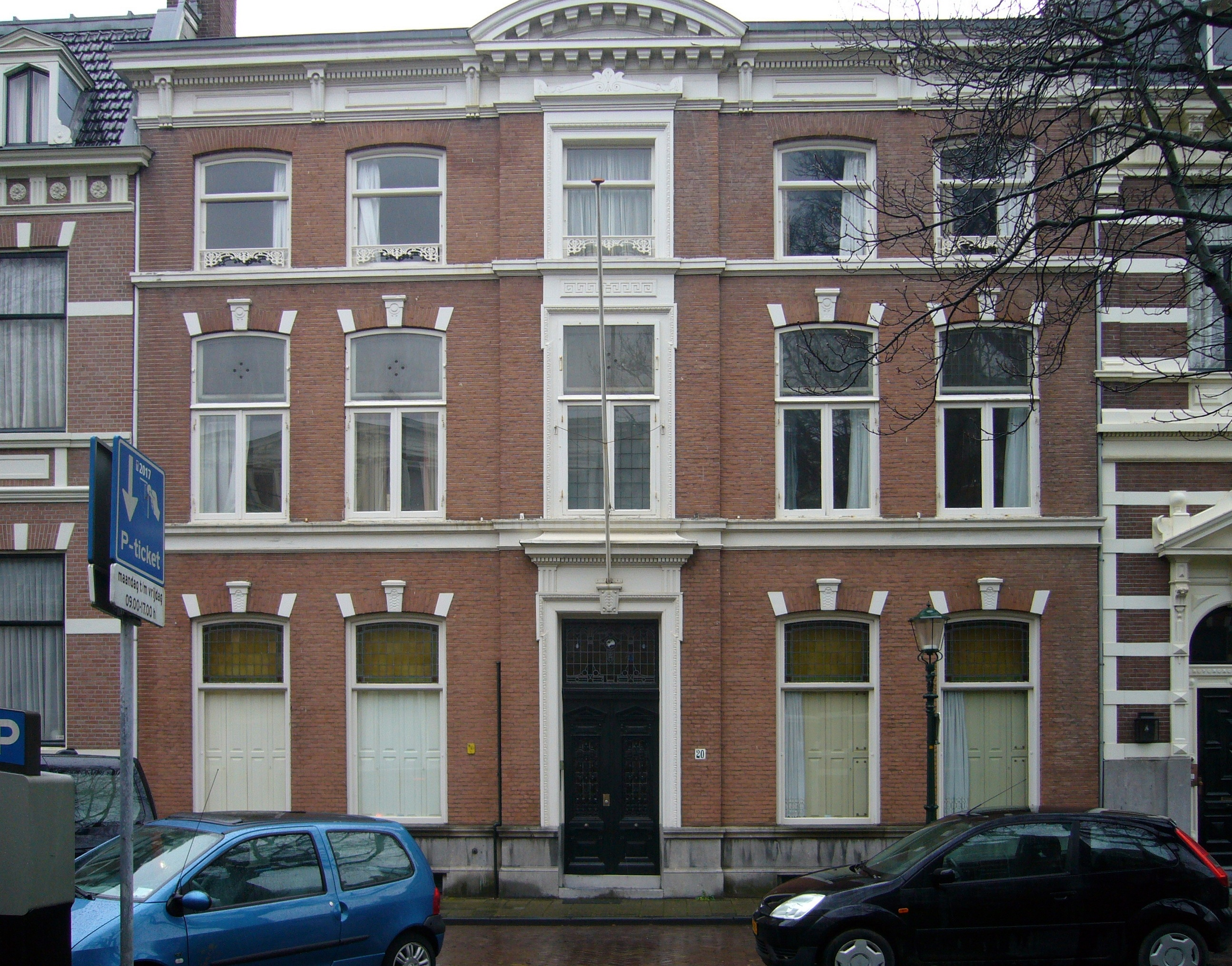
- Established: 1883
- Location: Surinamestraat 20, The Hague
- Type: Townhouse
- Visitors: Not allowed because the building is owned by the government of Egypt

Surinamestraat 20 in The Hague is the location of the house where the Dutch writer Louis Couperus wrote his novel Eline Vere. The father of Couperus, John Ricus Couperus (1816-1902) gave orders to build this house; he first sold his estate "Tjicoppo", which was located near Buitenzorg in the Dutch East Indies and then returned to the Netherlands, where he and his family moved into this house. John Ricus Couperus lived here until his death in 1902 and then the house was put up for sale.

== History ==
The Couperus family started living in this house in 1884 and between 1887 and 1888 this was the place where Louis Couperus wrote his novel Eline Vere. After the death of John Ricus Couperus the house was put up for sale and in 1903 bought by lawyer and writer Conrad Theodor van Deventer. He died in 1915 but his widow lived in the house until 1927, when the house was sold to the Egyptian embassy. From this date until August 2009 the house remained in use as such, when it was put up for sale. Some parts of the house are still authentic and have not been changed over the years.

When the house came on the market in 2006 professor Arnold Heertje, a Dutch economist, the Dutch writers Hella Haasse and Arnon Grunberg and others tried to gather funds to buy the house and keep it for the public. Later a foundation, called Stichting Couperus Surinamestraat was founded; its main aim was to create a Louis Couperus Museum within the house. However the foundation failed to achieve this goal because it could not find sponsors that would donate the 3 million Euro, which was necessary to buy the house. Dutch minister Ronald Plasterk was asked for help but he refused to donate funds to buy the house because he thought that the Nederlands Letterkundig Museum (the Dutch Literature Museum, located at the National library) proved enough honour to support the heritage of Couperus.

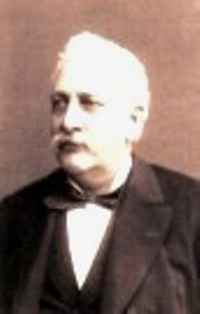
John Ricus Couperus, lawyer and father of Louis Couperus lived here from 1884-1902

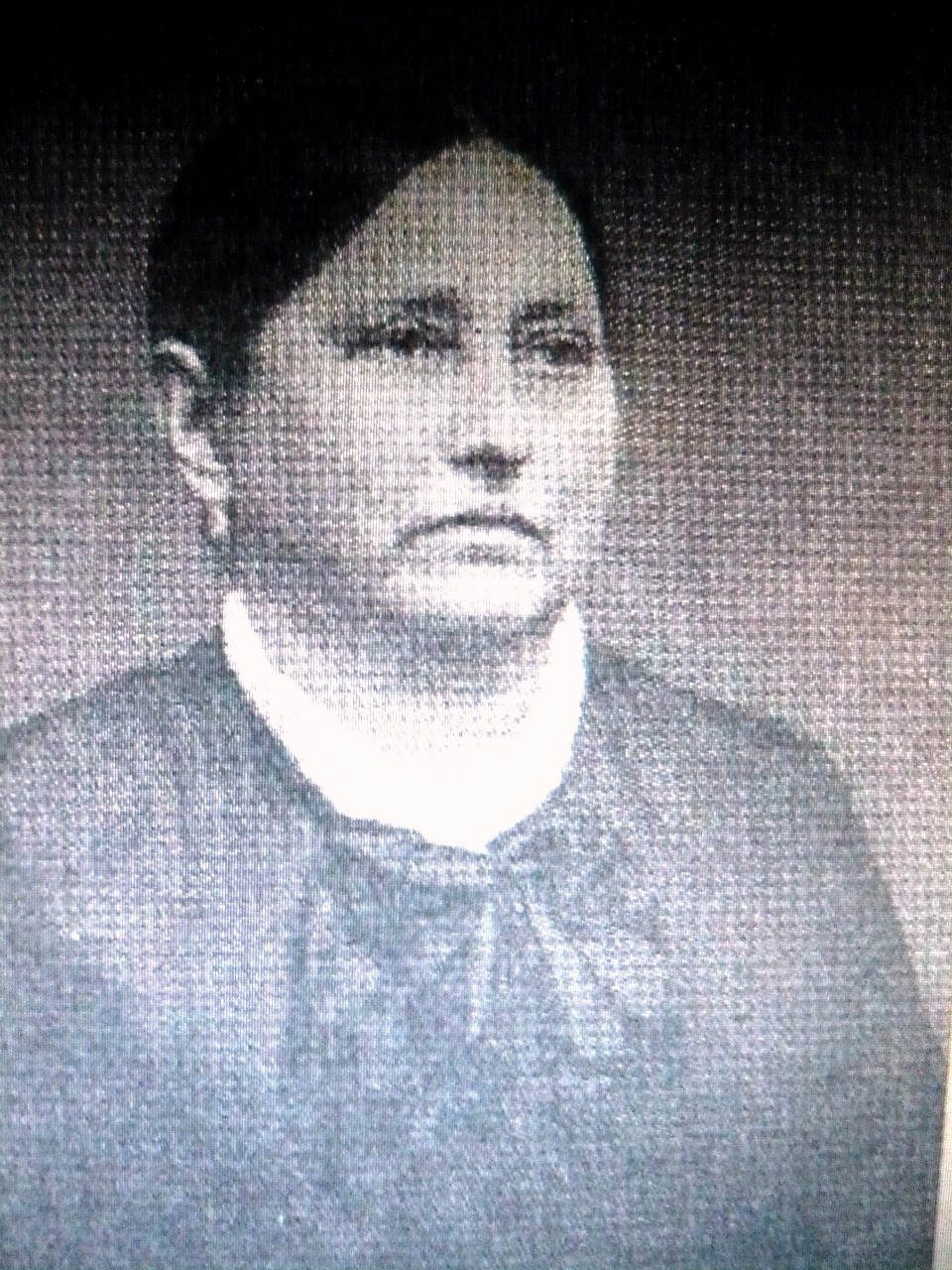
Mrs John Ricus Couperus, mother of Louis Couperus

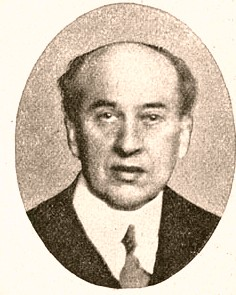
Louis Couperus wrote Eline Vere in this house

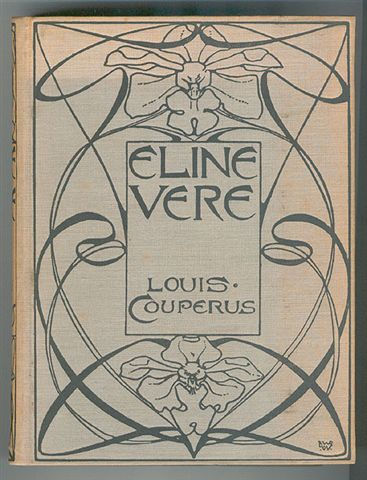
Eline Vere was written in this house in 1887-1888

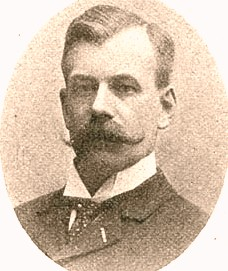
Lawyer and member of parliament Conrad Theodor van Deventer lived here from 1904-1915
