= Conrad Theodor van Deventer =

Dutch politician

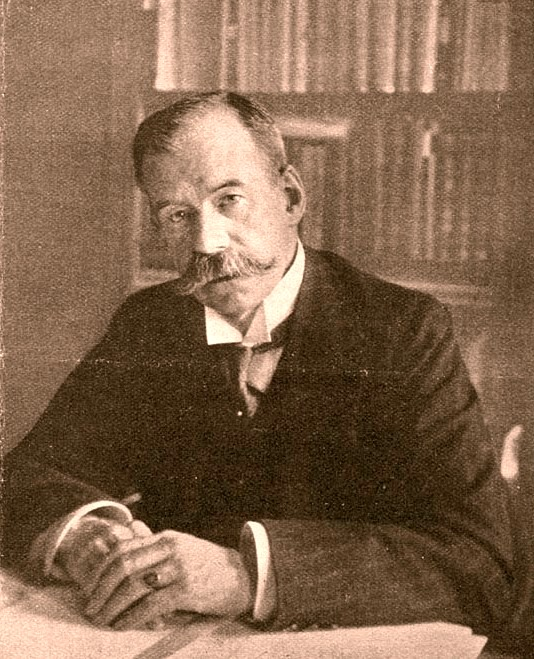
- Conrad Theodor van Deventer in his study (1915)
- Born: 29 September 1857; Dordrecht, Netherlands
- Died: 27 September 1915 (aged 57); The Hague, Netherlands
- Education: Leiden University
- Occupations: Politician, lawyer and writer
- Years active: 1877–1915
- Spouse: Elisabeth Maria Louise Maas

Conrad Theodor "Coen" van Deventer (29 September 1857 – 27 September 1915) was a Dutch lawyer, an author about the Dutch East Indies and a member of parliament of the Netherlands. He became known as the spokesman of the Dutch Ethical Policy Movement. He lived at Surinamestraat 20, The Hague (1903–1915), former residence of John Ricus Couperus, his son writer Louis Couperus and the rest of his family (1884–1902).

== Biography ==
=== Early career ===
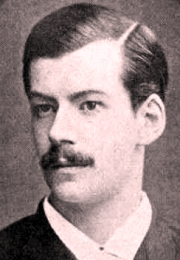
Van Deventer as a young man

Van Deventer was a son of Christiaan Julius van Deventer and Anne Marie Busken Huet. His uncle was the writer Conrad Busken Huet. He married Elisabeth Maria Louise Maas; they had no children. Van Deventer attended the H.B.S. in Deventer and studied law at Leiden University. He achieved his doctorate in September 1879 on the thesis: "Zijn naar de grondwet onze koloniën delen van het rijk" ("are, according to the constitution, our colonies part of the Dutch empire"). On 20 August 1880 he was made available to the Governor-General of the Dutch East Indies by the Ministry of Colonies to be appointed as civil service official. With his wife Van Deventer travelled in September 1880 to Batavia by steamboat Prins Hendrik; he was appointed court clerk at the Raad van Justitie (Council of Justice) at Amboina in December 1880. As early as 1881 Van Deventer was already seen by the public as an authority in the case of the issue of the economic position of the Dutch East Indies in relation to motherland the Netherlands. In lectures held during meetings of the "Indisch Genootschap" ("Indies Institute") his opinion on this matter was presented as very important.

In June 1882 Van Deventer was appointed court clerk at the "Landraden" (land boards) of Amboina, Saparua and Wahoo; he was also appointed auditeur militair (a legal position) at the court-martial in Amboina. In March 1883 he was appointed member of the Council of Justice in Semarang and that same year he wrote a series of articles in the Soerabaijasch Handelsblad, under the title Gedichten van F.L. Hemkes (poetry by F.L. Hemkes; Frederik Leonardus Hemkes was a Dutch poet, who lived in South-Africa (1854–1887)). Van Deventer wrote in February 1884 an article in Het Indisch Weekblad voor het Rech (The Dutch Indies Journal of Law), called "De Indische Militairen en het Koninklijke Besluit van 13 Oktober 1882 nummer 26'" (The military in the Dutch East Indies and the royal order of 13 October 1882), in which he discussed the trial of a Buginese soldier in front of a civil (police) court instead of a military one. In April 1885 Van Deventer quit his job as a member of the Council of Justice in Semarang and was appointed lawyer and attorney at this Council of Justice. In this period of his life Van Deventer was also active as a second lieutenant in the schutterij. That same year, 1885, he quit his job at the Council of Justice and joined the legal practice of LLM B.R.W.A. baron Sloet van Hagensdorp and LLM M.H.C. van Oosterzee; he replaced mr. Van Oosterzee, who would return to the Netherlands.

=== Career as a private lawyer ===
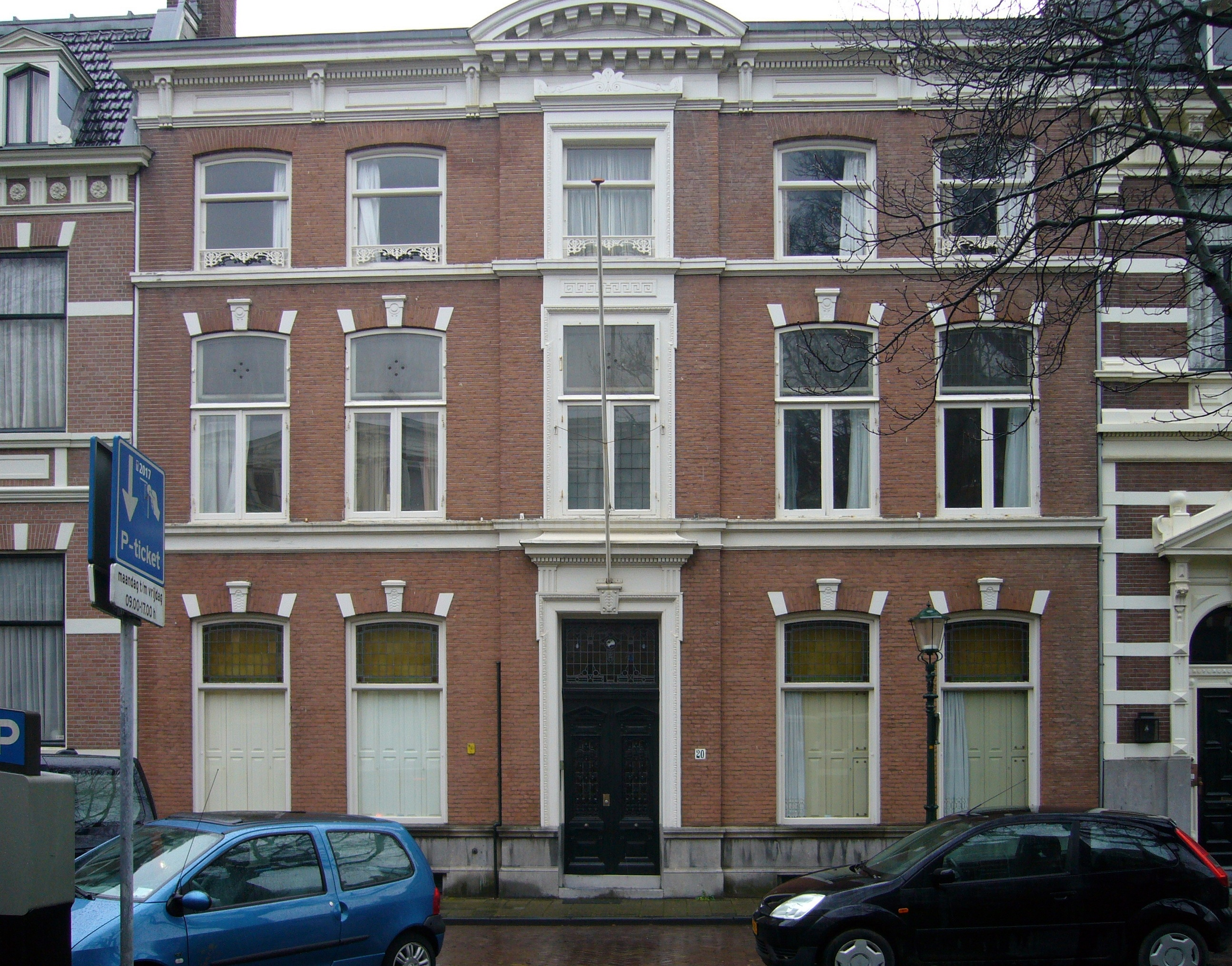
Home of Van Deventer from 1903 to 1915, Surinamestraat 20, The Hague

Van Deventer worked as a private lawyer from 1885 to 1888. In May 1888 he took a leave for Europe and travelled with his wife by steamboat Prinses Amalia from Batavia to the Netherlands. Back in Europe he wrote a series of articles, called "De Wagner-feesten te Bayreuth" (the Wagner festivals in Bayreuth), which he visited for the newspaper De Locomotief; in this period Van Deventer was a permanent employee of this newspaper. He returned to the Dutch Indies on 11 May 1889 by steamboat Sumatra. He resumed his lawyers practice and also became commissioner of the limited liability company "Hȏtel du Pavillon". In September 1892 he was appointed acting member of the Committee of Directors of the Nederlands-Indische Spoorweg Maatschappij (Dutch East Indian Railway Company). In July 1893 Van Deventer was promoted to the military rank of first lieutenant at the Schutterij in Semarang.

He left for a second short stay in Europe in May 1894 and was, after his return, appointed member of the supervisory committee of the HBS in Semarang. In the newspaper Locomotief he wrote an article called "Samarangsche bazar – eigen hulp" (Bazar of Samarang), in which he defended himself against accusations that the prospectus of this firm (Samarangsche bazar), made up by him, was not accurate. He left the Dutch East Indies (permanently) in April 1897 by steamboat Koningin-Regentes; back in Europe he visited the Wagner festivals and wrote about "Wagneriana" in the Locomotief of 11 November and 16 December 1897. In 1898 Van Deventer wrote several articles about the coronation celebrations in the Netherlands, where queen Wilhelmina was crowned, in the Locomotief. He also wrote a series of four articles, called "Het Wilhelmus als Nederlands Volkslied" (the Wilhelmus as the Dutch national anthem), for the Locomotief that year and gave in the Locomotief his perspective on the Zola trial.

=== Early political career ===
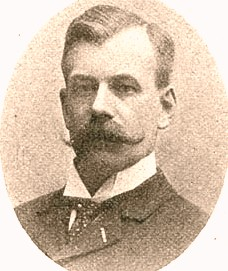
Van Deventer around the time when he became a politician

In 1899 Van Deventer wrote a very influential article, called "Een Ereschuld" (a debt of honour) in the Dutch magazine "De Gids". In this article Van Deventer stated that the Netherlands had a dept of honor of nearly 190 million gulden opposite the Dutch East Indies and had to pay for this dept of honor. When the Dutch East Indian budget was discussed in the House of Representatives a lot of attention was paid to Van Deventer's article, although not all members agreed with the content of the article. Van Deventer was appointed member of the editorial board of "The Gids" as of 1 January 1901. Over the next years until his death he would write numerous articles in this magazine. In June 1901 Van Deventer accepted his candidacy for the electoral association Schiedam (for the Free-thinking Democratic League), located the Schiedam, for the elections for the House of Representatives, but was not chosen. In lectures Van Deventer showed himself a supporter for the installation of a Dutch East Indian House of Representatives in the Dutch East Indies. In June 1902 he was appointed member of the "Algemeen Nederlands Verbond" (General Dutch Covenant) and wrote in het "Tijdschrift voor Nederlands-Indië" (Magazine for the Dutch East Indies) together with others, a concept colonial program; in this program the authors stated that the administrative power should lie more with the residents of the Dutch East Indies and that the government of the Netherlands should limit its interference to general government principles only. It seems contradictory that he also signed the telegram, send to general J. B. van Heutsz, in which he was complemented with the submission of Panglima Polim (a local leader), which was achieved by military force, in Aceh.

Van Deventer became a member of the board of the Royal Netherlands Institute of Southeast Asian and Caribbean Studies (1903) and that same year attended the meeting in London of the "Institut Colonial International". In September 1904 he was appointed knight in the Order of the Netherlands Lion. He kept writing articles in different magazines, other than The Gids; for instance he published a series of four articles in the Soerabaijasch Handelsblad in December 1904, called "Over de suikercultuur- en suikerindustrie" (about the sugar industry). On 19 September 1905 Van Deventer was elected as a Free-thinking Democratic member of the House of Representatives for the constituency Amsterdam IX and as such he emphasized his three focus points regarding Dutch East Indian policy: education, irrigation and emigration. He was also a promoter of the so-called Dutch Ethical Policy but at the same time said in a speech given in the House of Representatives on 16 November 1905, that if persuasion did not work it would be inevitable to use military force. In a series of articles in the "Soerabajasch Handelsblad" in August 1908 called "Insulinde's toekomst" (the future of the Dutch East Indies) he wrote about the importance of education and the creation of new jobs for natives on higher management levels. Van Deventer was not reelected and left the House of Representatives on 21 September 1909.

=== Later political career ===
Van Deventer was elected to be a member of parliament again on 19 September 1911, when he was appointed member of the Senate by the Provincial Council of Friesland. In this period he was also appointed as member of the Max Havelaar Foundation; this foundation was named after the famous book, written by Multatuli, and the aim of the foundation was the material and spiritual upliftment of the natives in the Dutch East Indies. In February 1912 Van Deventer made, as a member of the Senate, a journey of several months to the Dutch East Indies. He visited almost all islands, including but not limited to Sumatra, Java, Celebes and Borneo. He remained a Senate member until 16 September 1913, when he was reelected as a member of the House of Representatives for the constituency Assen. He kept this position until his death, on 27 September 1915. In June 1914 he was appointed official delegate of the Netherlands at the International Opium Conference held in The Hague. In 1913 he founded the Kartini Foundation in order to be able to establish girl schools in the Dutch East Indies. In September 1915 Van Deventer became seriously ill (he suffered from peritonitis) and was nursed at the Red Cross hospital in The Hague. He died at the age of 57 on 27 September 1915 and his body was cremated at Westerveld (Driehuis).

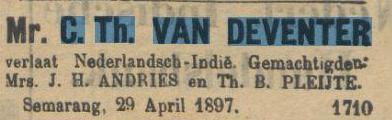
Advertisement in the "Locomotief", in which Van Deventer announces his departure for Europe in 1897

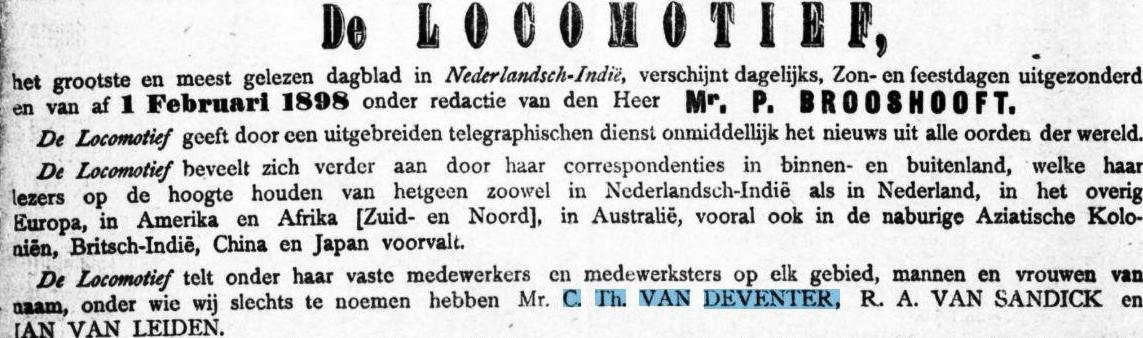
Advertisement in which Van Deventer is named as a permanent employee of the Locomotief

== Works ==
=== Summary ===
For the most part Van Deventer wrote about Dutch East Indian finance, the rights of the native officials and their education and about the sugar industry. When he was active as a journalist for the "Locomotief" he was particularly interested in Wagner and the Wagner Festival. As he was a member of the board of directors of the magazine "De Gids" most of his later articles were published there.

=== In "The Gids" ===
1899. Een eereschuld
1900. De eereschuld in het parlement, Drie boeken over Indië, with Herman Dirk van Broekhuizen and J.D. Baron van Wassenaar van Rosande, Zuid-Afrika,
1901. Uit Multatuli's dienstjaren, Indische decentralisatie-plannen
1902. Een bemiddelingsvoorstel, I.D. Fransen van de Putte, ter nagedachtenis, Indië en de democratie, Parlementaire kroniek, Aanteekeningen en opmerkingen,
1903. Parlementaire kroniek (9 parts),
1904. Koloniale hervorming?, Bibliographie (2 parts), Parlementaire kroniek
1905. Rechtshervorming in Indië, Bibliografie
1906. Bibliografie, Atjeh
1908. Insulinde's toekomst, Indische feiten en cijfers
1909. Verandering?, Amerika in Azië, together with J.N. van Hall, Johan de Meester and R.P.J. Tutein Nolthenius: Bibliographie
1910. Insulinde in het parlement, Hooger onderwijs voor Nederlandsch-Indië, together with Johan de Meester and Carel Scharten: Bibliographie, together with J.N. van Hall, Johan de Meester and Johanna Westerdijk: Bibliographie, together with J.N. van Hall and Carel Scharten: Bibliographie, Havelaar-voorspel, Uit Multatuli's Dienstjaren, Insulinde te Brussel, Multatuli aan den koning,
1911. Van west en oost, Kartini, De oplossing der islâm-quaestie in Nederlandsch-Indië, Aanteekeningen en opmerkingen
1913. Giftvrij lichtgas, Aanteekeningen en opmerkingen, De ijs-steen
1914. Het pijnlijke kwartier, Naar den Indischen schoolvrede,
1915. Indië na den oorlog
1922. (posthumously) Over de getuigstukken voor de dubbele storm, De dubbele storm. Een verhaal van staatkundige beroering

=== In "Neerlandia" ===
1900. Christiaan de Wet, Oost-en-West, Een Stem uit Java
1902. Een belangrijk besluit.
1903. Afdeelingen’, Afdeeling 's-Gravenhage, together with H.D.H. Bosboom, P.J. de Kanter, H. Kern, H.J. Kiewiet de Jonge, J.M. Pijnacker Hordijk and O. van der Wijck: Twee adressen.
1906. Noord-Nederland., Verslag over de Liederenavonden voor het Volk in Den Haag (Winterseizoen 1905–1906)

House of Representatives of the Netherlands
Preceded by Hendrik Bijleveld	Member for Amsterdam IX; 1905–1909	Succeeded by Willem Vliegen
Preceded by Willem Treub	Member for Assen; 1913–1915	District abolished
