= Willem Vliegen =

Dutch politician (1862-1947)

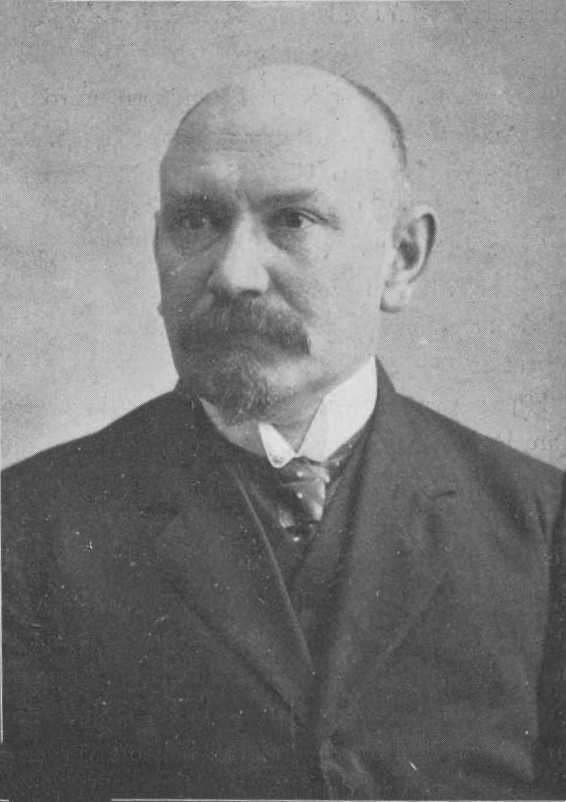
- Vliegen c. 1913

Member of the House of Representatives
- In office 25 July 1922 – 8 June 1937
- In office 21 September 1909 – 1 October 1915
- Preceded by: Conrad Theodor van Deventer
- Succeeded by: Jan van den Tempel
- Constituency: Amsterdam IX

Member of the Senate
- In office 27 November 1917 – 24 July 1922
- Preceded by: Hendrik Lodewijk Drucker
- Constituency: North Holland

Personal details
- Born: Wilhelmus Hubertus Vliegen; 20 November 1862 Gulpen, Netherlands
- Died: 29 July 1947 (aged 84) Bloemendaal, Netherlands
- Party: Social Democratic League (1883–1894); Social Democratic Workers' Party (1894–1946); Labour Party (1946–1947)
- Spouse: Maria Margaretha Hofman (m. 1888)

Wilhelmus Hubertus "Willem" Vliegen (20 November 1862 – 29 July 1947) was a Dutch journalist and politician of the Social Democratic Workers' Party who served as a member of the House of Representatives from 1909 until 1915, and again from 1922 until 1937. He also served as a member of the Senate from 1917 until 1922.

== Early life and career ==
Wilhelmus Hubertus Vliegen was born in Gulpen on 20 November 1862 to Jan Martinus Hubertus Vliegen, a carpenter, and Helena Jacquemin. He attended lower education until the age of 11, and then worked as a typesetter. He was introduced to socialism while working in Liège, and after moving to Amsterdam in 1883, he became a member of the Social Democratic League (SDB). He started working at Excelsior, the SDB's publishing office, in The Hague in 1887, and became a member of the executive board of the party's local branch. In 1889, Vliegen moved to Maastricht, where he established a local SDB branch. He also became editor of the SDB-aligned paper De Volkstribuun the following year.

For some time, Vliegen was conflicted about the party's internal struggle between revolutionaries and reformists, but he ultimately joined the latter in leaving the party, and became one of the twelve founders of the Social Democratic Workers' Party (SDAP) in 1894. In 1897, he became editor of De Sociaaldemokraat and was elected chairman of the SDAP's national party board. He briefly lived in Paris, where he was inspired by the constructive politics of Jean Jaurès, and in 1902 he became editor of Het Volk.

== Political career ==
Starting in 1906, Vliegen served in a number of political offices at the local, provincial and national level. In that year, he was elected to the municipal council of Amsterdam, in which he served until 1924. He also served as a member of the Provincial Council of North Holland between 1907 and 1917, and as a member of the House of Representatives for the district of Amsterdam IX from 1909 until 1915. He served as alderman of Amsterdam twice; he was responsible for finance and municipal companies between 1914 until 1919, and for education, the civil registry and art between 1921 and 1923. He was a member of the Senate from 1917, until going back to the House in 1922, where he would remain until his retirement in 1937.

Within the SDAP, Vliegen was a leader of the moderate wing. Alongside the party's leader, Pieter Jelles Troelstra, he opposed the orthodox Marxist opposition within the party until it broke away to form the Social Democratic Party in 1909. In 1913, however, Vliegen came into conflict with Troelstra by publicly arguing in favour of the party's participation in government, and he strongly disapproved of Troelstra's attempt at revolution in the Red Week in 1918. He maintained his leading role in the party up to the 1930s.

== Private life ==
Vliegen married Maria Margaretha Hofman, who worked as a domestic servant, on 23 May 1888. The couple had two sons and two daughters.

== Legacy ==
The Amsterdam urban green space of Vliegenbos, built between 1909 and 1921, is named after Vliegen. He advocated for a "forest for the workers, in the shadow of Amsterdam, a piece of unspoiled nature that the city so desperately needs". This urban forest was also meant to serve as buffer zone between residential neighborhoods and a chemical factory located on the bank of the IJ river.
