= Amsterdam IX (electoral district) =

Former electoral district of the Netherlands

Amsterdam IX was an electoral district of the House of Representatives in the Netherlands from 1897 to 1918.

== Profile ==
The electoral district of Amsterdam IX was created in 1897, when the district of Amsterdam, like all other remaining multi-seats districts, was split into single-member districts. The territory of Amsterdam IX roughly corresponded with the neighbourhoods of Oud-West, Frederik Hendrikbuurt and Staatsliedenbuurt, all located in the current borough of Amsterdam-West.

Due to Amsterdam's rapid urban expansion into the district's boundaries, its electorate grew rapidly, from just 5,215 in 1897 to 27,317 in 1917, making it the largest electorate of any district at that time.

The district of Amsterdam IX was abolished upon the introduction of party-list proportional representation in 1918.

== Members ==
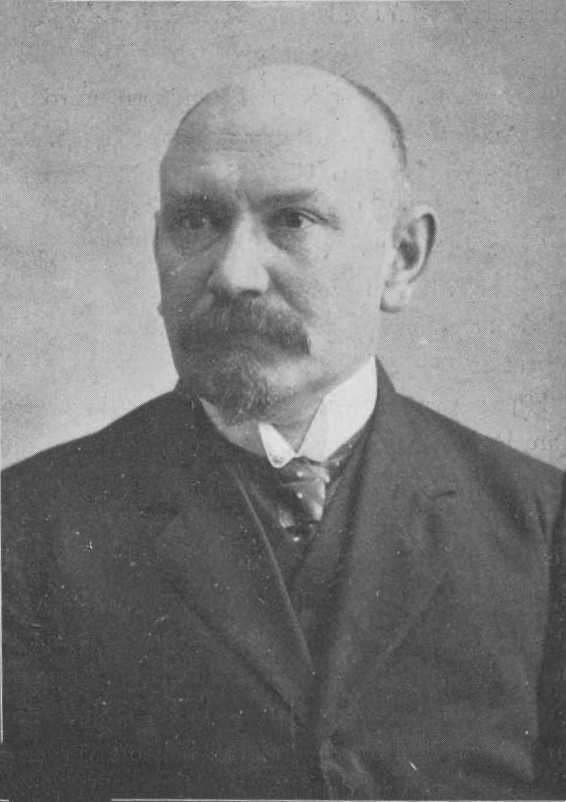
Willem Vliegen

In its inaugural election, the district of Amsterdam IX elected the former Liberal Minister of the Interior Johannes Tak van Poortvliet. However, Tak van Poortvliet was also elected in the district of Beverwijk and opted to represent the latter, thus triggering a by-election in Amsterdam IX in which the Liberals held the seat. In 1901, the district elected Cornelis Lely, but he resigned a year later following his appointment as Governor-General of Suriname. In the subsequent by-election, the Anti-Revolutionary Hendrik Bijleveld narrowly defeated Social Democratic (SDAP) leader Pieter Jelles Troelstra in the runoff, becoming the only representative from the parliamentary right in the district's existence. Amsterdam IX was won by the Free-thinking Democratic League in 1905, and was represented by the SDAP from 1909 until its abolition in 1918.

Election	Member	Party	Ref
1897	Johannes Tak van Poortvliet	Lib	
1897	Arnold Kerdijk	Lib	
1901	Cornelis Lely	Lib	
1902	Hendrik Bijleveld	AR	
1905	Conrad Theodor van Deventer	VD	
1909	Willem Vliegen	SDAP	
1913	Willem Vliegen	SDAP	
1915	Jan van den Tempel	SDAP	
1917	Jan van den Tempel	SDAP	

== Election results ==
=== Elections in the 1890s ===
1897 general election: Amsterdam IX
Candidate	Party	First round		Second round	
Candidate	Party	Votes	%	Votes	%
Johannes Tak van Poortvliet	Lib	1,520	44.90	2,309	63.00
Abraham Kuyper	AR	1,142	33.74	1,356	37.00
Johannes Theodoor de Visser	CHK	472	13.94		
J.A. Fortuyn	SDAP	251	7.42		
Total		3,385	100.00	3,665	100.00
Valid votes		3,385	100.00	3,665	99.84
Invalid/blank votes		0	0.00	6	0.16
Total votes		3,385	100.00	3,671	100.00
Registered voters/turnout		5,215	64.91	5,215	70.39
Liberal gain					
Source: Kiesraad, Huygens Instituut

1897 Amsterdam IX by-election
Candidate	Party	Votes	%
Arnold Kerdijk	Lib	1,229	51.60
Theo Heemskerk	AR	835	35.05
Willem Hendrik de Beaufort	VL	285	11.96
W.J. den Boer	Independent	33	1.39
Total		2,382	100.00
Valid votes		2,382	99.42
Invalid/blank votes		14	0.58
Total votes		2,396	100.00
Registered voters/turnout		5,215	45.94
Liberal hold			
Source: Kiesraad, Huygens Instituut

=== Elections in the 1900s ===
1901 general election: Amsterdam IX
Candidate	Party	First round		Second round	
Candidate	Party	Votes	%	Votes	%
Hendrik Bijleveld	AR	1,532	34.07	2,058	41.76
Cornelis Lely	Lib	1,289	28.66	2,870	58.24
Adriaan Gerhard	SDAP	877	19.50		
Jan van Gilse	VD	799	17.77		
Total		4,497	100.00	4,928	100.00
Valid votes		4,497	96.48	4,928	98.74
Invalid/blank votes		164	3.52	63	1.26
Total votes		4,661	100.00	4,991	100.00
Registered voters/turnout		7,935	58.74	7,935	62.90
Liberal hold					
Source: Kiesraad, Huygens Instituut

1902 Amsterdam IX by-election
Candidate	Party	First round		Second round	
Candidate	Party	Votes	%	Votes	%
Pieter Jelles Troelstra	SDAP	2,050	37.19	3,231	49.25
Hendrik Bijleveld	AR	1,643	29.81	3,330	50.75
Carel Victor Gerritsen	VD	1,016	18.43		
Nicolaas Pierson	Lib	803	14.57		
Total		5,512	100.00	6,561	100.00
Valid votes		5,512	97.75	6,561	97.55
Invalid/blank votes		127	2.25	165	2.45
Total votes		5,639	100.00	6,726	100.00
Registered voters/turnout		9,137	61.72	9,137	73.61
Anti-Revolutionary gain					
Source: Kiesraad, Huygens Instituut

1905 general election: Amsterdam IX
Candidate	Party	First round		Second round	
Candidate	Party	Votes	%	Votes	%
Conrad Theodor van Deventer	VD	3,678	38.48	6,465	64.84
Hendrik Bijleveld	AR	3,456	36.15	3,506	35.16
J.G. van Kuykhof	SDAP	2,318	24.25		
T.B.V. Dill	CHP	107	1.12		
Total		9,559	100.00	9,971	100.00
Valid votes		9,559	98.23	9,971	99.32
Invalid/blank votes		172	1.77	68	0.68
Total votes		9,731	100.00	10,039	100.00
Registered voters/turnout		12,748	76.33	12,748	78.75
Free-thinking Democratic gain					
Source: Kiesraad, Huygens Instituut

1909 general election: Amsterdam IX
Candidate	Party	First round		Second round	
Candidate	Party	Votes	%	Votes	%
T. de Vries	AR	4,516	34.95	6,250	45.32
Willem Vliegen	SDAP	4,421	34.22	7,542	54.68
Conrad Theodor van Deventer	VD	3,792	29.35		
Louis de Visser	SDP	191	1.48		
Total		12,920	100.00	13,792	100.00
Valid votes		12,920	97.89	13,792	99.20
Invalid/blank votes		279	2.11	111	0.80
Total votes		13,199	100.00	13,903	100.00
Registered voters/turnout		18,434	71.60	18,434	75.42
SDAP gain					
Source: Kiesraad, Huygens Instituut

=== Elections in the 1910s ===
1913 general election: Amsterdam IX
Candidate	Party	First round		Second round	
Candidate	Party	Votes	%	Votes	%
Willem Vliegen	SDAP	8,204	46.81	11,038	64.22
Victor Rutgers	AR	5,519	31.49	6,149	35.78
T.B. Pleijte	VD	3,655	20.86		
David Wijnkoop	Independent	147	0.84		
Total		17,525	100.00	17,187	100.00
Valid votes		17,525	95.89	17,187	99.38
Invalid/blank votes		751	4.11	108	0.62
Total votes		18,276	100.00	17,295	100.00
Registered voters/turnout		22,557	81.02	22,557	76.67
SDAP hold					
Source: Kiesraad, Huygens Instituut

1915 Amsterdam IX by-election
Candidate	Party	Votes	%
Jan van den Tempel	SDAP	7,121	52.99
Willem de Vlugt	AR	5,897	43.88
David Wijnkoop	Independent	421	3.13
Total		13,439	100.00
Valid votes		13,439	98.71
Invalid/blank votes		176	1.29
Total votes		13,615	100.00
Registered voters/turnout		24,967	54.53
SDAP hold			
Source: Kiesraad, Huygens Instituut

1917 general election: Amsterdam IX
Candidate	Party	Votes	%
Jan van den Tempel	SDAP	5,880	62.29
J.F. Baerveldt	AG	1,894	20.06
David Wijnkoop	Independent	1,039	11.01
W. Oosterbaan	WK	627	6.64
Total		9,440	100.00
Valid votes		9,440	93.73
Invalid/blank votes		632	6.27
Total votes		10,072	100.00
Registered voters/turnout		27,317	36.87
SDAP hold			
Source: Kiesraad, Huygens Instituut
