= Jan van den Tempel =

Dutch politician (1877–1955)

His Excellency Jan van den Tempel
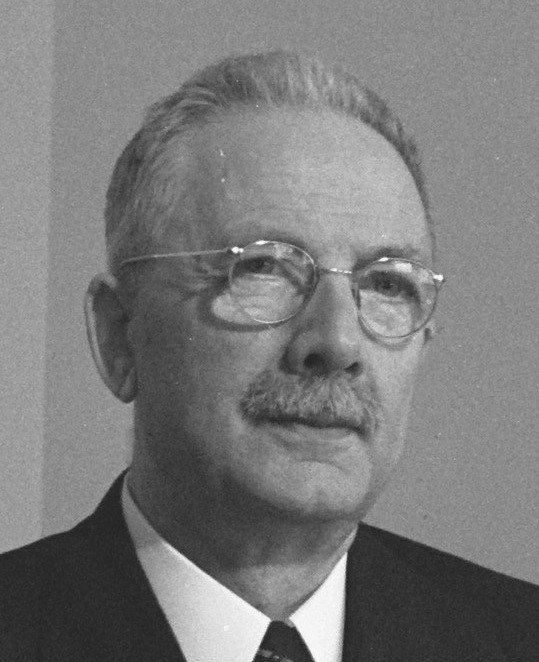
- Jan van den Tempel in 1942

Minister of Commerce, Industry and Shipping
- In office 17 November 1941 – 8 January 1942; Ad interim
- Prime Minister: Pieter Sjoerds Gerbrandy
- Preceded by: Max Steenberghe
- Succeeded by: Piet Kerstens

Minister of Agriculture and Fisheries
- In office 17 November 1941 – 8 January 1942; Ad interim
- Prime Minister: Pieter Sjoerds Gerbrandy
- Preceded by: Max Steenberghe
- Succeeded by: Piet Kerstens

Minister of Social Affairs
- In office 10 August 1939 – 23 February 1945
- Prime Minister: Dirk Jan de Geer (1939–1940); Pieter Sjoerds Gerbrandy (1940–1945)
- Preceded by: Marinus Damme
- Succeeded by: Frans Wijffels

Member of the House of Representatives
- In office 10 November 1915 – 10 August 1939
- Constituency: Amsterdam IX (1915–1918)

Personal details
- Born: Jan van den Tempel; 1 August 1877 Willemstad, Netherlands
- Died: 27 June 1955 (aged 77) Amsterdam, Netherlands
- Cause of death: Peptic ulcer disease
- Party: Labour Party (from 1946)
- Other political affiliations: Social Democratic Workers' Party (until 1946)
- Spouse: Arnolda Jansen (m. 1903)
- Children: Bas van den Tempel (1905–1992); 1 other son and 1 daughter
- Education: Netherlands School of Commerce (Bachelor of Economics, Master of Economics, Doctor of Philosophy)
- Occupation: Politician · Civil servant · Economist · Trade union leader · Nonprofit director · Managing editor · Author

Jan van den Tempel (1 August 1877 – 27 June 1955) was a Dutch politician of the defunct Social Democratic Workers' Party (SDAP).

== Decorations ==
Honours
Ribbon bar	Honour	Country	Date	Comment
	Commander of the Order of Orange-Nassau	Netherlands	6 May 1946	
	Knight of the Order of the Netherlands Lion	Netherlands	30 April 1949	

House of Representatives of the Netherlands
Preceded by Willem Vliegen	Member for Amsterdam IX; 1915–1918	District abolished
Political offices
Preceded by Marinus Damme	Minister of Social Affairs; 1939–1945	Succeeded by Frans Wijffels
Preceded by Max Steenberghe	Minister of Agriculture and Fisheries; Ad interim 1941–1942	Succeeded by Piet Kerstens
Preceded by Max Steenberghe	Minister of Commerce, Industry and Shipping; Ad interim 1941–1942	Succeeded by Piet Kerstens
