= Lucie van Dam van Isselt =

Dutch artist (1871–1949)

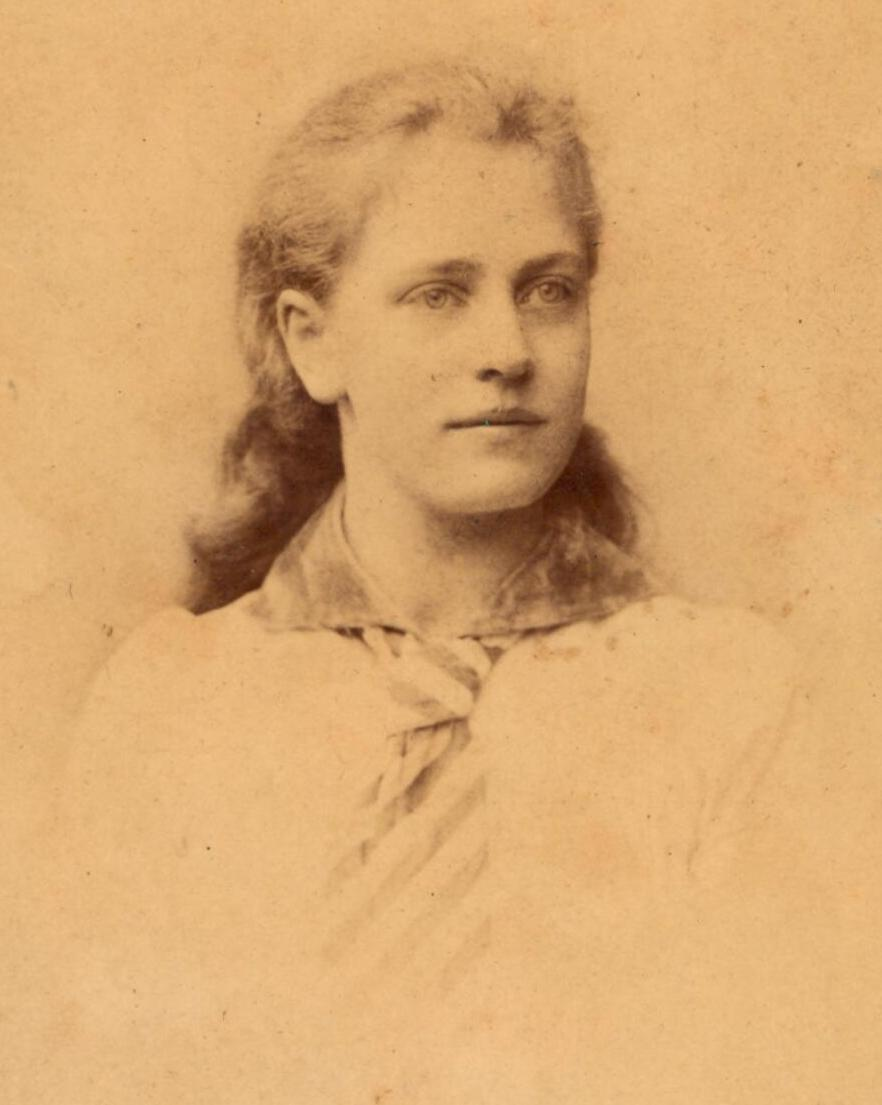
- Born: 15 June 1871; Bergen op Zoom, Netherlands
- Died: 7 June 1949 (aged 77); The Hague, Netherlands
- Other names: Lucie Ekker
- Spouses: Evert Cornelis Ekker (m. 1892; div. 1907) Albert Charles Auguste Plasschaert (m. 1909; div. 1921)
- Children: 2
- Website: lucievandamvanisselt.nl

Lucie van Dam van Isselt or Lucie Dam van Isselt later Lucie Ekker (15 June 1871 – 7 June 1949) was a Dutch artist known for her floral paintings.

== Life ==
Van Dam van Isselt was born in Bergen op Zoom, North Brabant, Netherlands in 1871. Her formal painting education began at the Royal Academy of Visual Arts in The Hague. She learnt about etchings and lithography from Auguste Morisot at the École nationale supérieure des beaux-arts de Lyon.

She traveled through Europe and painted in various places in Belgium, France and Italy. Her oeuvre is varied: portraits, various types of still lifes, genre, figure and animal performances. The Flemish neo-impressionist painter Théo van Rysselberghe was an inspiration for her. She painted in the Zeeland town of Veere and is therefore counted among the Veerse Joffers.

Van Dam van Isselt was the subject of a portrait by Jan Toorop in 1905.

She has paintings in several collections including the Teylers Museum. Isselt's work was included in the 1939 exhibition and sale Onze Kunst van Heden (Our Art of Today) at the Rijksmuseum in Amsterdam.

She married, and divorced, twice. She married in her home town in 1892 to the painter and mechanical engineer Evert Cornelis Ekker. They divorced in 1907 after they had had two children. She remarried on 12 May 1909 in Utrecht to the art critic Albert Charles Auguste Plasschaert. Their marriage was dissolved in 1921.

Van Dam van Isselt died in The Hague in 1949.

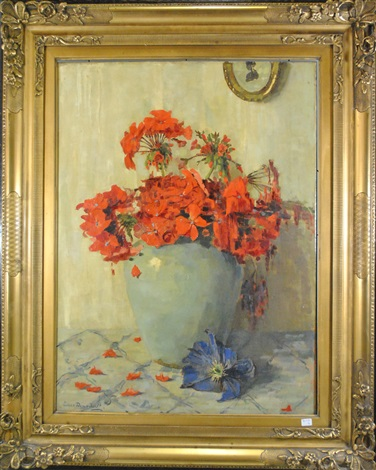
Sans Titre by Lucie van Dam van Isselt

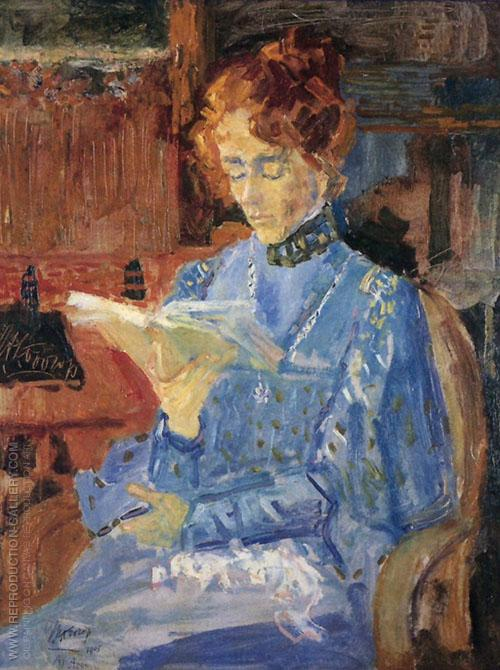
Lucie van Dam van Isselt by Jan Toorop
