= Piet Kerstens =

Dutch politician and educator

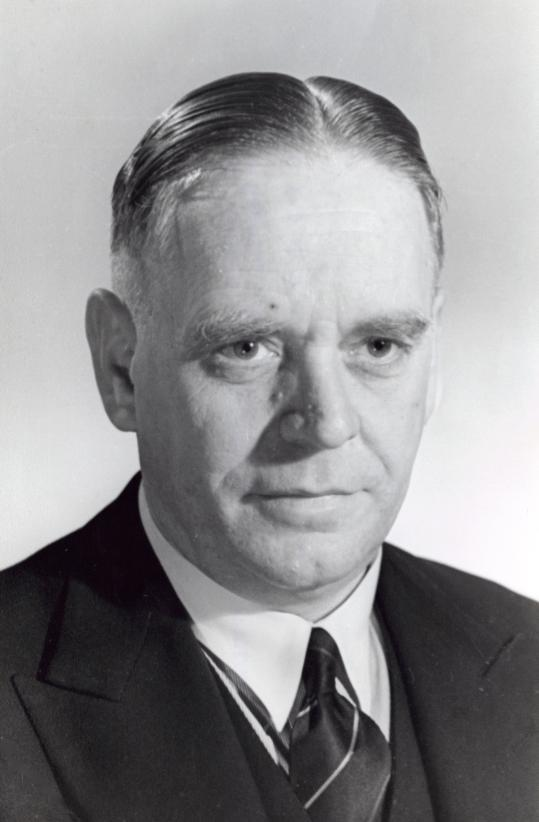
Piet Kerstens

Petrus Adrianus (Piet) Kerstens (born 23 August 1896, in Ginneken – died 8 October 1958, in The Hague) was a Dutch Catholic politician, journalist, and educator who played a significant role in both colonial and postwar Dutch politics. Active in the Dutch East Indies during the interwar period, he served as chairman of the Indische Katholieke Partij (IKP) and as a member of the Volksraad. During the Second World War he was Minister of Trade, Industry and Shipping, and Minister of Agriculture and Fisheries in the Dutch government‑in‑exile. After the war he became editor‑in‑chief of De Tijd and later served in the Dutch Senate, where he was known for his advocacy of European integration.

Early Life and Education Kerstens was born in Ginneken, then part of the municipality of Ginneken en Bavel, in the Dutch province of North Brabant. He grew up in a large Roman Catholic family. After completing teacher training, he taught in Eindhoven and later at the Roman Catholic Commercial School in Amsterdam. In 1921 he married Sybilla van Straaten; the couple had eight children.

During the early 1920s Kerstens was active as a Catholic writer and translator, contributing to journals such as Roeping, Opgang, and Het Schild. He published works on Catholic literature and translated books by G.K. Chesterton.

Career in the Dutch East Indies

Education and Journalism In 1926 Kerstens moved to the Dutch East Indies, where he served as director of the Strada MULO school in Batavia until 1934. He became increasingly active in Catholic journalism, serving as editor‑in‑chief of Sociaal Leven en Streven and founding De Nieuwe Tijd, the organ of the Indische Katholieke Partij. (Dutch Indies Catholic Party)

A critical article in De Maasbode led to the withdrawal of his appointment as MULO inspector, marking his transition from education to political and public affairs.

Indische Katholieke Partij (Dutch Indies Catholic Party) Kerstens chaired the Indische Katholieke Partij (IKP) from 1933 to 1941. Under his leadership the party expanded significantly, establishing branches across Java and in several cities outside the island.

Volksraad From 1935 to 1942 Kerstens served in the Volksraad, the advisory parliament of the Dutch East Indies, representing the interests of European and Indo‑European Catholics. He also sat on the College of Delegates.

Second World War

Minister in the Government‑in‑Exile Following the Japanese invasion of the Dutch East Indies, Kerstens reached London, where the Dutch government‑in‑exile was based. In January 1942 he was appointed Minister of Trade, Industry and Shipping, and Minister of Agriculture and Fisheries in the second Gerbrandy cabinet.

Shipping Policy Kerstens introduced the Vaarplichtbesluit 1942, imposing a compulsory sailing obligation on Dutch seamen until the age of 60. He also implemented the Zeeschepenbesluit, enabling the requisition of merchant vessels. In June 1942 the Dutch merchant fleet was placed under state control.

Conflict and Resignation His efforts to improve conditions for seamen, including wage increases and proposals for worker participation, led to conflict with shipowners and fellow ministers. He resigned on 31 May 1944 after plans emerged to create a separate Ministry of Shipping.

Camp Columbia and Postwar Administration After leaving the cabinet, Kerstens became Indisch Government Commissioner and Director of Education and Worship for the Dutch East Indies (1944–1946). He worked with the exiled Indies administration under Lieutenant‑Governor‑General H.J. van Mook, which operated from Camp Columbia near Brisbane, Australia.

Postwar Journalism From 1946 to 1947 Kerstens served as editor‑in‑chief of the Catholic daily De Tijd. He adopted a progressive stance on the Indonesian independence question, advocating negotiated settlement while maintaining the unity of the kingdom. His position led to conflict with the newspaper’s board, resulting in his departure. He later joined the editorial staff of De Linie.

Senate Career Kerstens was elected to the Dutch Senate for the Catholic People’s Party (KVP) in 1946, serving until 1952. He was vice‑chairman of the KVP Senate faction and focused on colonial, foreign, and defense issues. He played a prominent role in debates on the transfer of sovereignty to Indonesia and served on the Commission of Nine, which prepared constitutional revisions related to the Dutch‑Indonesian Union.

European Integration Kerstens was an early advocate of European cooperation. He chaired the Dutch organizing committee of the Congress of Europe held in The Hague in 1948 and participated in European federalist movements. From 1949 to 1951 he was a member of the Consultative Assembly of the Council of Europe. He co‑founded the Dutch section of the European League for Economic Cooperation (ELEC) and served as its first chairman.

Other Activities Kerstens held various corporate and academic board positions, including as a member of the non-executive board in several companies and membership on the supervisory board of the Catholic Economic University in Tilburg. He was chairman and later vice‑chairman of the program council of Radio Netherlands Worldwide.

Honours

Knight of the Order of the Dutch Lion (1949)

Officer of the Order of Orange‑Nassau

Officer of the French Légion d’honneur (1951)

Personal Life Kerstens remained active in Catholic circles throughout his life. His eldest son, Jan Willem Hendrik Kerstens, died in Dachau concentration camp in 1945. Another son, Piet Kerstens Jr., served as a KNIL pilot in Batavia after the war. Kerstens died in The Hague in 1958.
