= Eline Vere =

Novel by Louis Couperus

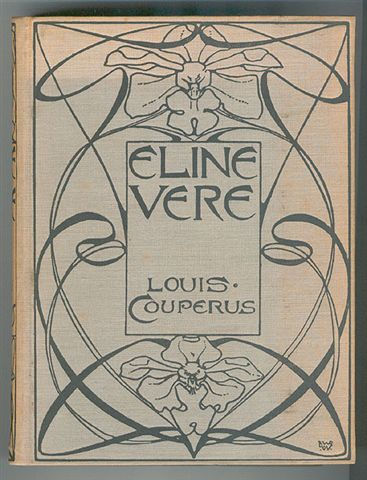
- First edition cover
- Author: Louis Couperus
- Translator: J.T. Grein; Ina Rilke
- Cover artist: L.W.R. Wenckebach
- Language: Dutch
- Publisher: Van Kampen
- Publication date: 1889
- Publication place: Netherlands
- English publication date: 1892; 2010
- Pages: 463

Eline Vere is an 1889 novel by the Dutch writer Louis Couperus. It was adapted into the 1991 film Eline Vere, directed by Harry Kümel. Couperus wrote Eline Vere in the house at Surinamestraat 20, The Hague.

== Reception ==
The naturalistic novel, first published in a daily newspaper (1888–1889), instantly established Couperus as a household name in the Netherlands. It has been in print ever since. In Dutch, there have been about thirty editions until 2010, two adaptations for the theatre and one for film. Composer Alexander Voormolen dedicated his Nocturne for Eline (1957) to the protagonist of the novel. It has been translated into English (twice), into Norwegian and into Urdu.

After the publication of the translation by Ina Rilke, the book was reviewed in The Scotsman in 2010: "Couperus is a fine, driving storyteller even when he's off telling fairy stories in some symbolist landscape as in the rather mimsy Psyche. He wrote Eline Vere for serialisation, so it has the energy of the great Victorian novels without the melodrama, something astounding spread over 600 careful pages. ... Rediscovered novels usually make you realise why they were lost in the first place, but Eline Vere is an exception: a pleasure we've missed for far too long."

== See also ==
- 1889 in literature
- Dutch literature
