= Ecstasy: A Study of Happiness =

Novel by Louis Couperus

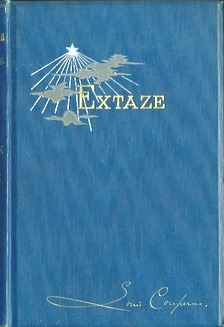
- Cover of Ecstasy: A Study of Happiness
- Author: Louis Couperus
- Original title: 'Extaze. Een boek van geluk'
- Translator: Alexander Teixeira de Mattos
- Language: Dutch
- Publisher: L.J. Veen, in the United States by Dodd, Mead and Company
- Publication date: 1892
- Publication place: Netherlands
- English publication date: 1919

Ecstasy: A Study of Happiness (Dutch: Extaze. Een boek van geluk) is a novel written by Louis Couperus and published in 1892 by L.J. Veen in a first edition of 1,250–1,500 copies. A second edition was printed in 1894 (1,250 copies) and a third in 1905 (2,000 copies). Ecstasy was the first book of Couperus that was published by L.J. Veen, later his regular publisher. Couperus received a wage of 550 guilders for the first edition. Ecstasy was first published in the Dutch literary magazine The Gids. The book was translated into English by Alexander Teixeira de Mattos in 1919 and published by Dodd, Mead and Company.

== Description ==
=== Ecstasy ===
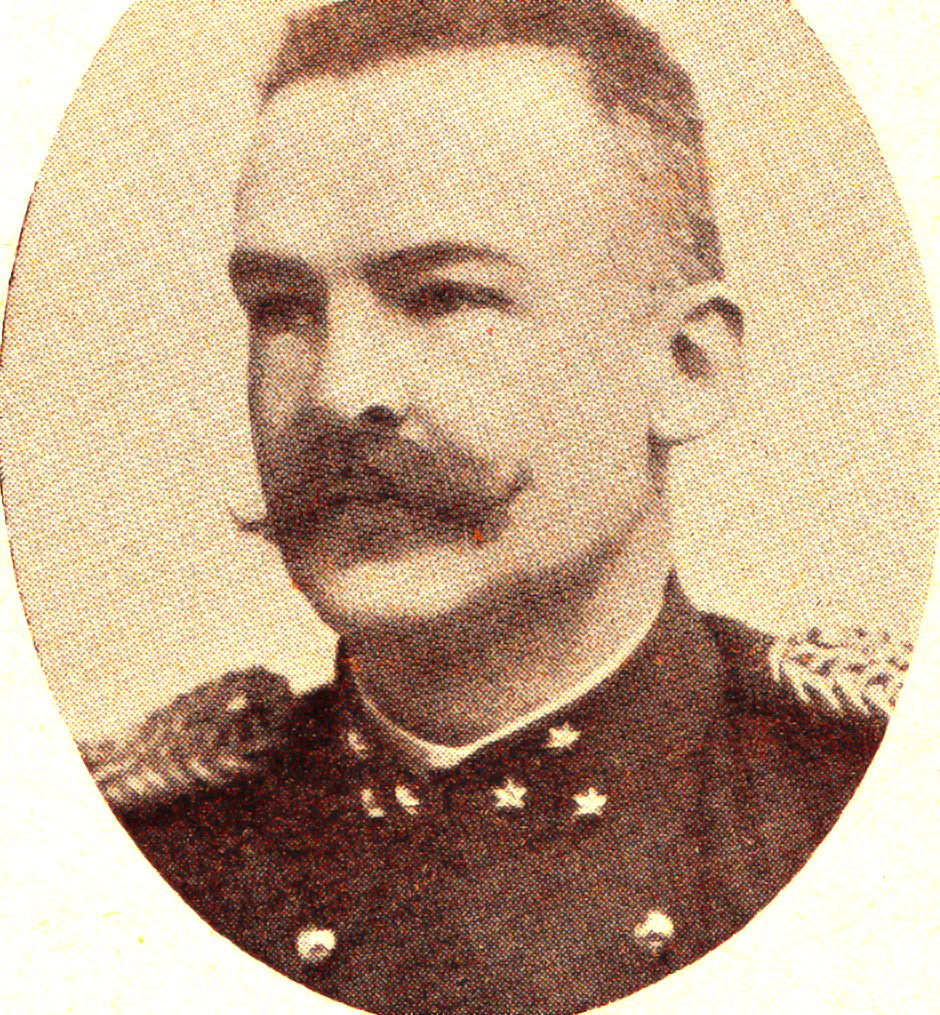
One of the main characters of Ecstasy was based on that of captain Johan Hendrik Ram

Couperus dedicated Ecstasy: A Study of Happiness to happiness and suffering together. The book is a so-called psychological novel and deals with the life of widow Cecile van Erven who meets Taco Quaerts. This Taco Quaerts sees in her an exalted love while Van Erven longs for a more humane role in his life. In 1894 a translation into German was made by Freia Norden, however in the Algemeen Handelsblad it was said that this translation was rather bad. In a book review in The New York Times in 1919 was written that the book was frail, delicate, mystical, written with a light, yet firm touch which saved it from falling into those twin perils of absurdity and pathos which hedged it around. Earlier, Couperus' novel was translated into French by Charles Sluijts (1897) and published as a serial in the magazine Ind. Belge. In a review in the "Tweemaandelijks Tijdschrift" of March 1895 Lodewijk van Deyssel wrote an article about Couperus and praised his book Ecstasy.

In a letter (8 July 1890) Couperus wrote to his friend Frans Netscher that his novel Footsteps of Fate would be published in October in "The Gids" and that he had plans to write a large novel, called Ecstasy. When Couperus wrote Ecstasy he was inspired by the book of Paul Bourget, Un coeur de femme, which was then published as a serial in Le Figaro. The motive of this book (a young heroine meets a profligate man) Couperus mixed with his own favorite theme: caresses without lust, kissing of the soul. A third figure in the book, an androgynous boy, was probably based on himself as a young boy. It is possible that the figure of the male protagonist was inspired by that of Johan Hendrik Ram (a military figure and a close friend of Couperus). During the time Couperus wrote the book he spent a lot of time with Ram who, by that time, had signed up for a period of five years in Aceh. In contrast to Footsteps of Fate in Ecstasy the good triumphs although Couperus' glorified a form of platonic love in which the male figure rejects sexuality and so the heroine must satisfy herself with an incomplete love life.

=== Couperus while writing Ecstasy ===
It took Couperus more time to write Ecstasy than it did to write Eline Vere, although the first novel had fewer pages. While he was still busy writing he and his wife, Elisabeth Couperus-Baud, moved to Hilversum, to Villa Minta (named after Couperus-Baud's sister). By that time autumn had begun and violent storms and rain had set in. During one of these storms Couperus and his wife were forced to flee, while the wind blew the roof tiles off the house. Henri van Booven later recalled that Elisabeth Couperus carried the cash box while Couperus took his most precious possession of that time, being the manuscript of Ecstasy. After Couperus finished Ecstasy it was published in January 1892 in "The Gids". By that time Couperus stayed with his parents, John Ricus Couperus and his wife, at their home in Surinamestraat 20, The Hague. Couperus found the volume of Ecstasy sufficient to be published as a separate book and contacted publisher L.J. Veen. Veen made him an offer, which Couperus first refused but later Veen made a better offer which Couperus accepted.

On 31 January Couperus made a proposal for the book cover of Ecstasy. In a letter to L.J. Veen he wrote: I think of a large star with a single line of a cloud to the upper left and the title should be positioned at the bottom right. Do you happen to know anyone who could make a drawing like that? L.J. Veen thought that Jan Veth could be the right artist to make the book cover but his concept-drawing was rejected by Couperus. Although Lodewijk van Deyssel was very impressed by Ecstasy, Frederik van Eeden was not. Probably in an ironic response to the review of Van Eeden, Couperus wrote him a letter, saying that he knew a lady who was a psychic and asked Van Eeden if he could decipher her handwriting. Meanwhile, Ecstasy was translated in German and other languages and Couperus was rather upset and not amused by the review of Van Deyssel, because, as Couperus later wrote: Van Deyssel claimed that Ecstasy was sublime, but that I had written it by mistake, and that one of them should have written it.

== Gallery ==
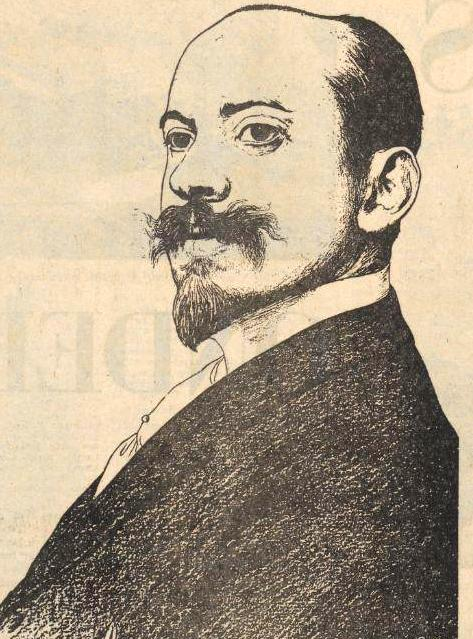
Louis Couperus was the author of Ecstasy: A Study of Happiness

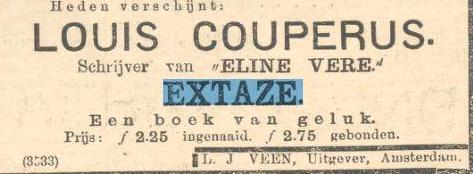
Advert for the book

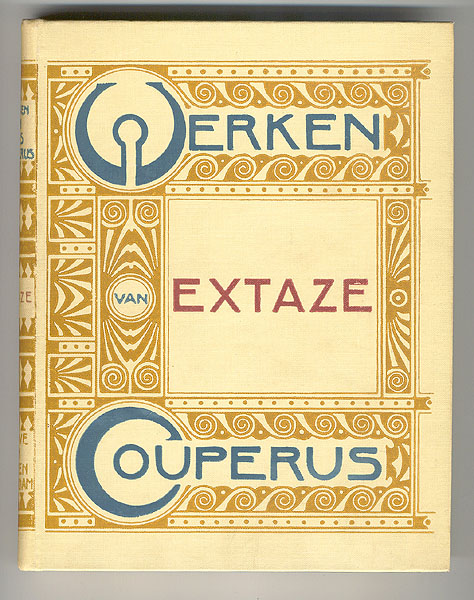
Bookcover of Ecstasy (1905), designed by Hendrik Petrus Berlage

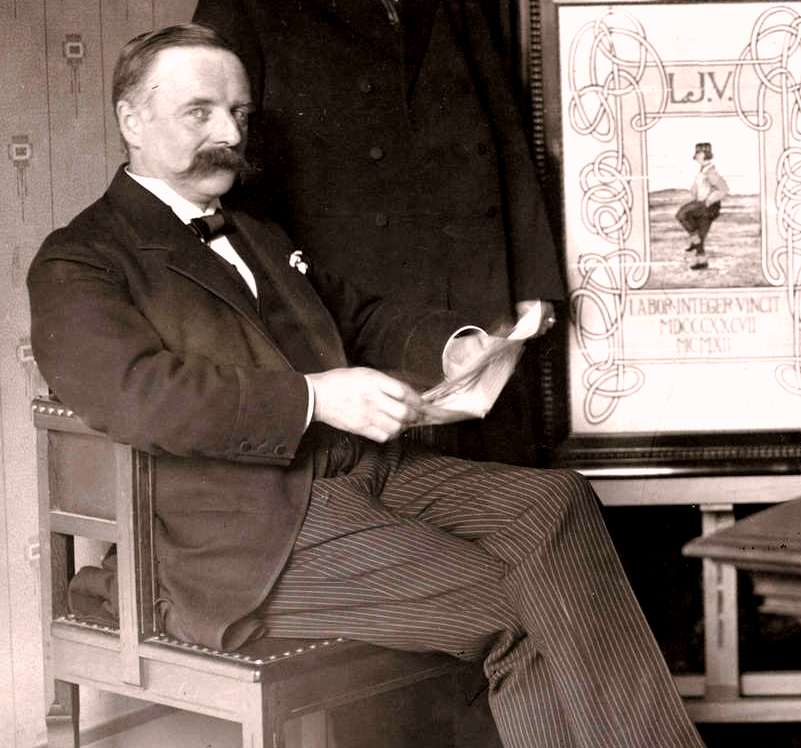
Ecstasy was published by publisher Lambertus Johannes Veen

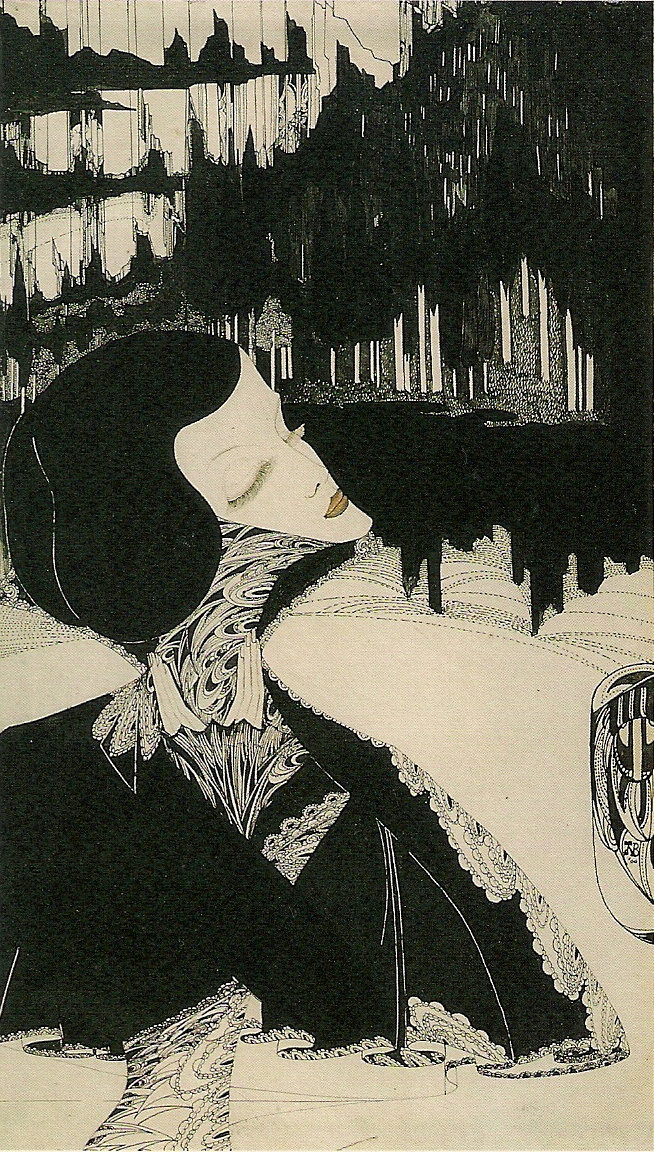
Karel de Nerée tot Babberich made illustrations based on the novel Ecstasy

== Sources ==
- Bastet, Frédéric (1987). Louis Couperus. Een biografie (in Dutch). Amsterdam. ISBN 9021451360.
