= Karel de Nerée tot Babberich =

Dutch painter

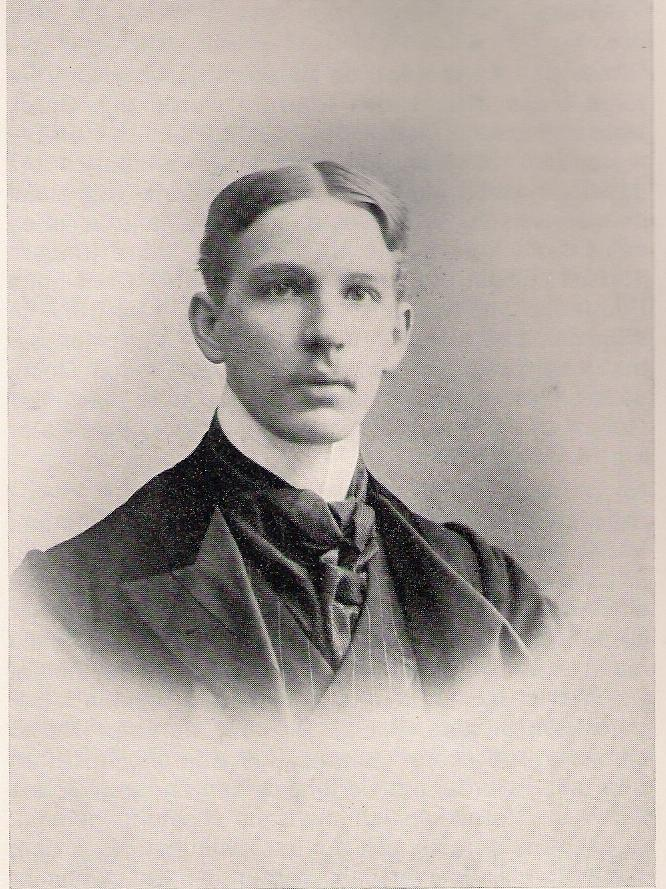
Carel de Nerée in 1901

Christophe Karel Henri (Karel) de Nerée tot Babberich (18 March 1880 – 19 October 1909) was a Dutch symbolist artist who worked in the decadent and symbolist style of Aubrey Beardsley and Jan Toorop.

De Nerée was born in Zevenaar (The Netherlands) on Huize Babberich, the son of Frederick de Nerée tot Babberich (1851–1882) and Constance van Houten (1858–1930).

De Nerée began drawing and writing in 1898. De Nerée's literary writings and art work were very much inspired by decadent and symbolist authors such as Charles Baudelaire, Paul Verlaine or Gabriele d'Annunzio, and artists such as de Feure, Goya, Johan Thorn Prikker, and Jan Toorop. Increasingly he focused on his art rather than poetry. Only posthumously, in 1916, were two of his poems published in a French periodical.

In 1901, De Nerée worked in Madrid as a representative for Foreign Affairs. He caught tuberculosis, a disease that would determine the rest of his life. In Madrid, De Nerée was visited by his friend Henri van Booven, the future biographer of Louis Couperus, who later gave a thinly veiled report of this visit in his novel Een liefde in Spanje ('A Love in Spain', 1928). De Nerée also inspired Van Booven to write his volume of (prose) poems Witte Nachten ('White Nights', 1901) and the novel Tropenwee ('Tropical Agony', 1904), the latter being a Conrad-like report of his traumatic visit to the Belgian Congo. In his turn Van Booven gave De Nerée The Early Work (1899) by Aubrey Beardsley. This was obviously great influence on De Nerée's style of drawing. Later, around 1904-1905, he developed his own unique style. The themes, usually 'femmes fatales' or clownesque figures, gold nuances and symbolism of these works often recall associations with the best wor He is one of the few 'decadent' Dutch representatives of the European symbolist movement.

During his life he did not exhibit; he was a well-known society figure. Sometimes he gave friends drawings and around 1905 he sold several works to collectors, mostly from Germany. Due to his poor health, drawing and painting became ever more difficult after 1906-1907. The little known works from his later period are characterized by their colors and modernist compositions. He died on 19 October 1909 at 29 years of age, in the southern German town of Todtmoos. He was buried in Clarens, near Montreux.

The nature of his work, the Beardsley-imitation and the somewhat 'decadent' character, set de Nerée naturally in a somewhat isolated position in art history. During the twentieth century, however, his work was exhibited several times and he has received a well-deserved small but certain place in European art history around the turn of the twentieth century.

== Works ==
A selection of his works:

- Henri van Booven as a young priest (1900)
- Walden, [not used] book cover (1900)
- The beautiful image (1900)
- Introduction to Ecstasy of Couperus (1900–01)
- Ecstasy, finals (1900–01)
- Self Portrait (1900–01)
- Illustration for Le Jardin des Supplices (1899) by Octave Mirbeau (1900)
- Love Game No. 1 (1900–01)
- Black Swans (1901)
- The Bride (1901)
- Two Women (1901)
- Salome (1901)
- Owl (1903)
- Clowning (1904)
- La Musique (1904)
- La rencontre (1904)
- Sortie (1904)
- Rococo (1904–05)
- Rôdeuse (1904–05)
- Portrait Study / selfportrait (1905)
- Study of a Sulamitic (1905)
- Le mauvais regard (1906)
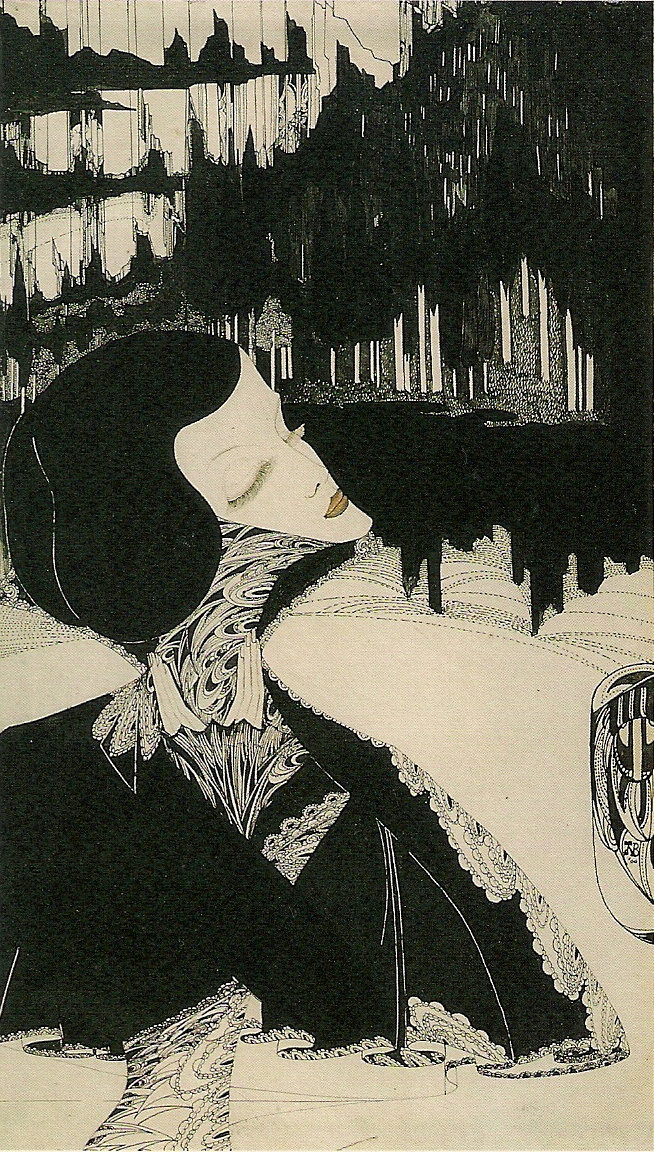
Introduction to Extaze (1900–01)

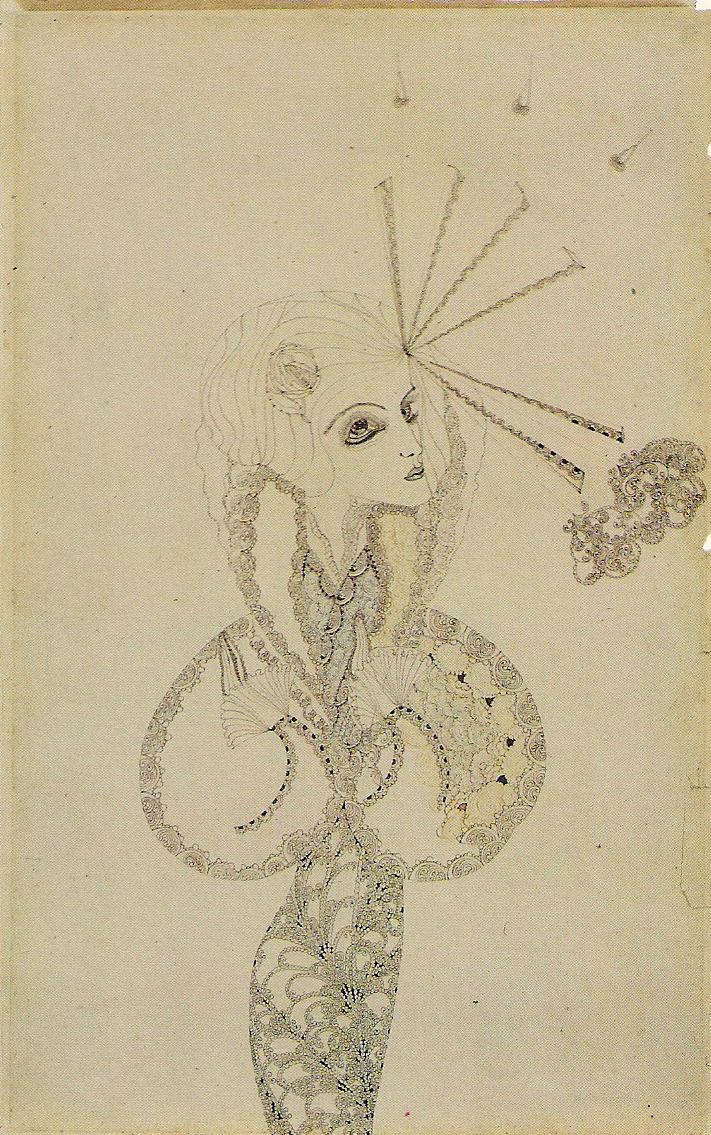
The beautiful Image (1900)

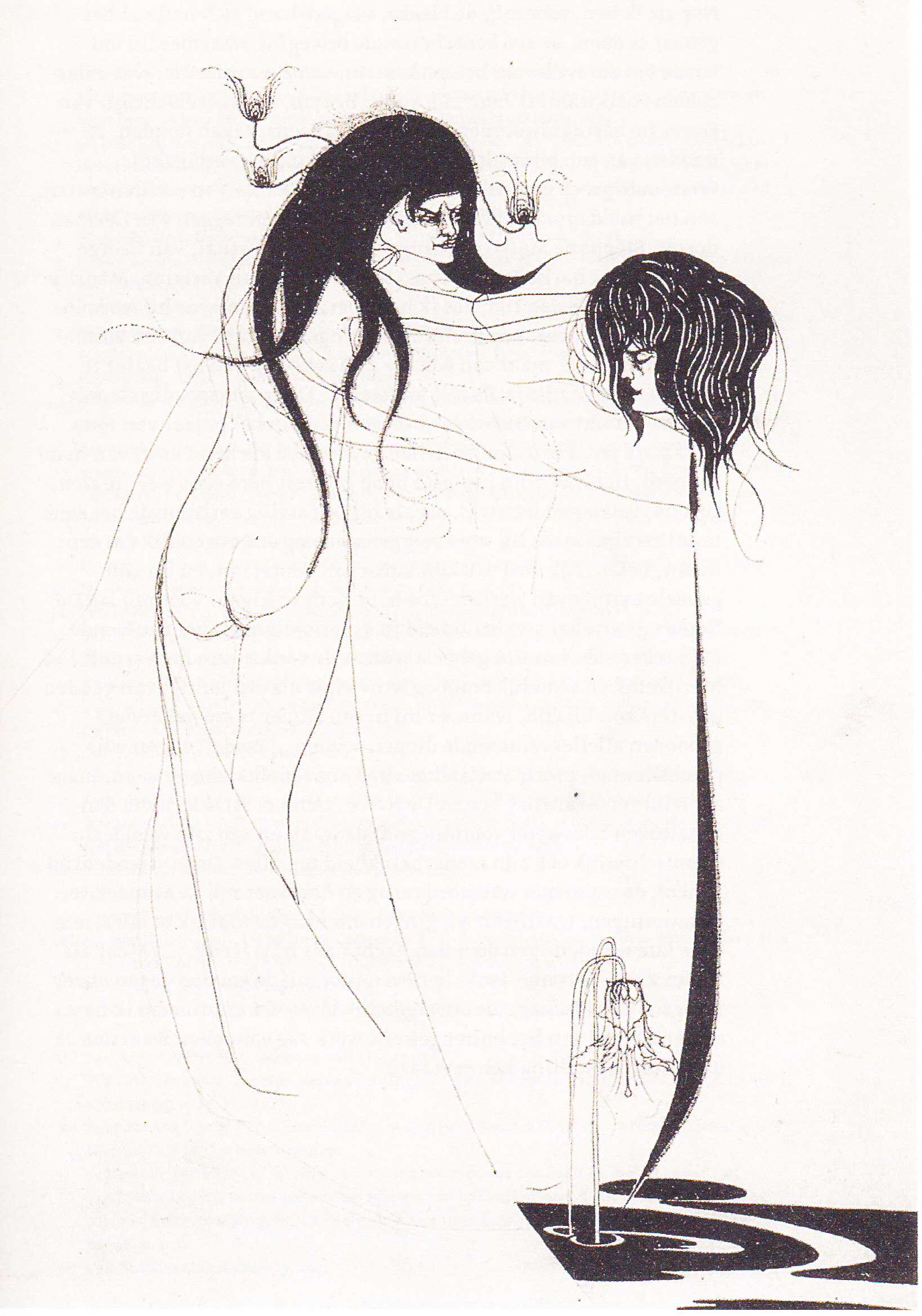
Salome (1901)

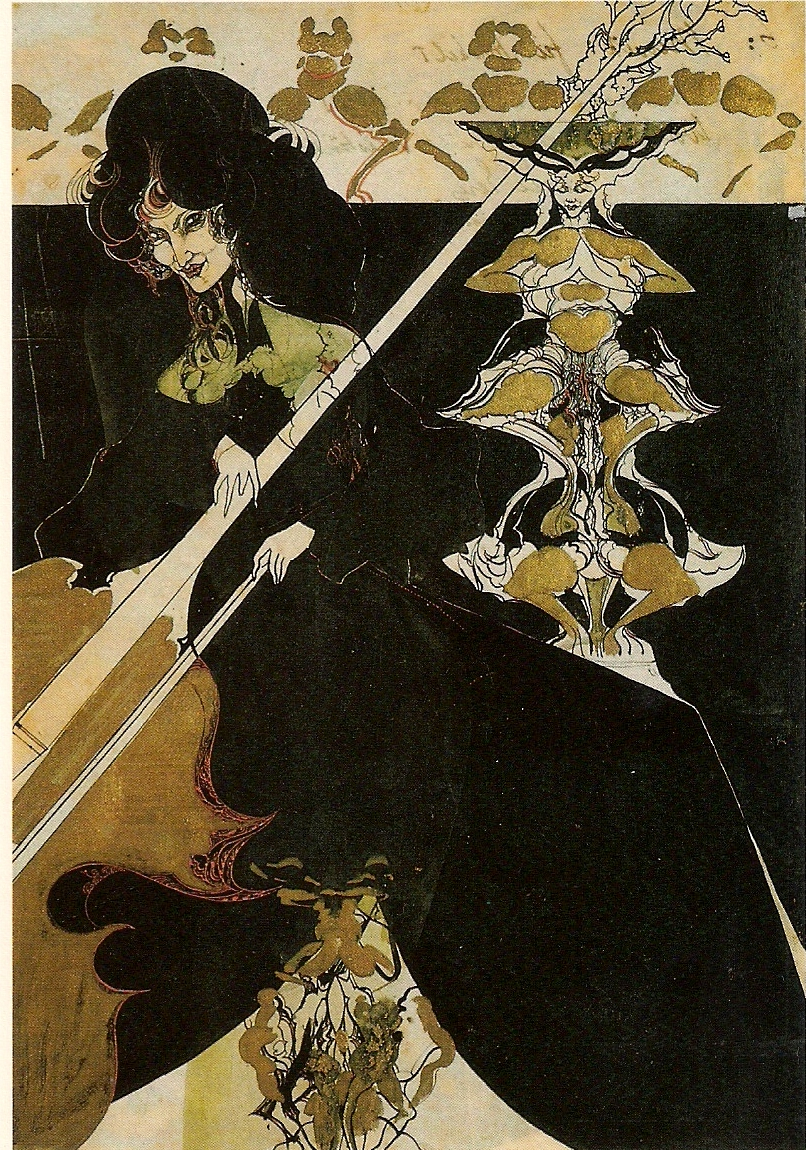
La musique (1904)

== Exhibitions ==
- The Hague, Kunstkring, 1910
- Amsterdam, Arti, 1910
- The Hague, d'Audretsch (with H. Daalhoff a.o.), 1914
- Haarlem, Du Bois, 1936
- Milan & München, Gallery Levante, 1970
- Laren, Singer Museum, 1974
- Kleve, Städtliches Museum, 1975
- The Hague, Staal Banker, 1982
- Arnhem, Gemeentemuseum, 1986
- Arnhem, Gemeentemuseum, 1998
