= SS Aquileia =

Dutch-built ocean liner that became a troopship and hospital ship, and blockship

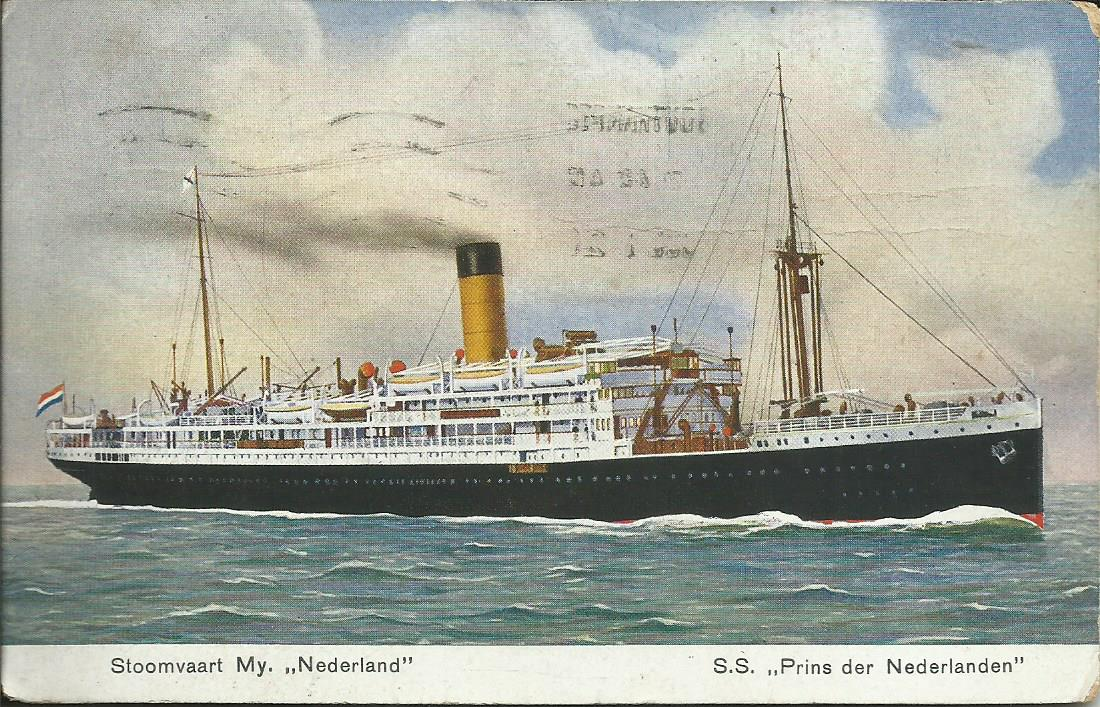
- Postcard of the ship as Prins der Nederlanden

History
- Name: 1914: Prins der Nederlanden; 1935: Aquileia
- Namesake: 1914: Heinrich von Mecklenburg-Schwerin; 1935: Aquileia
- Owner: 1914: Netherland Line; 1935: Lloyd Triestino
- Operator: 1940: Regia Marina; 1943: Kriegsmarine
- Port of registry: 1914: (Netherlands) Amsterdam; 1935: (Kingdom of Italy) Genoa; 1937: (Kingdom of Italy) Trieste
- Route: 1914: Amsterdam – Batavia
- Ordered: 18 November 1911
- Builder: Nederlandsche SM, Amsterdam
- Cost: 2,853,000 guilders
- Yard number: 123
- Laid down: October 1912
- Launched: 20 August 1913
- Completed: January 1914
- Maiden voyage: 31 January 1914
- Out of service: laid up 1930–35
- Identification: 1914: code letters PQMS; 1914: call sign PFQ; 1934: call sign PGVH; 1935: call sign IBEO
- Fate: Scrapped in 1947

General characteristics
- Type: Ocean liner
- Tonnage: 9,322 GRT, 5,689 NRT, 7,150 DWT
- Length: 481.0 ft (146.6 m)
- Beam: 57.2 ft (17.4 m)
- Draught: 26 ft 0 in (7.92 m)
- Depth: 26.8 ft (8.2 m)
- Decks: 2 + shelter deck
- Installed power: 1914: 1,105 NHP, 7,000 ihp; 1927: 1,257 NHP
- Propulsion: 2 × screws; 2 × quadruple expansion engines
- Speed: 15 knots (28 km/h)
- Capacity: passengers: 140 × 1st class, 136 × 2nd class, 34 × 3rd class, 42 × steerage; cargo: 321,000 cu ft (9,100 m^{3}) grain; 296,000 cu ft (8,400 m^{3}) bale
- Sensors & processing systems: 1914: submarine signalling; 1927: wireless direction finding
- Notes: sister ship: Koningin Emma

SS Aquileia was a Dutch-built steamship that was launched in 1913 as the ocean liner and mail ship Prins der Nederlanden for Netherland Line. She ran scheduled services between Amsterdam and the Dutch East Indies until 1930, when she was laid up.

In 1935 Lloyd Triestino bought her and renamed her Aquileia. In the Second Italo-Ethiopian War and the Spanish Civil War she was an Italian troop ship. In the Second World War she was a hospital ship for Italy and then for Germany. In 1944, German forces scuttled her as a blockship. Her wreck was raised in 1946 and scrapped in 1947.

The ship's Italian name is spelt Aquileia. However, Lloyd's Register always recorded her as Aquileja. Prins der Nederlanden has been the name of several ships. The career of this one overlaps with that of a smaller Prins der Nederlanden that was built in 1902 for Koninklijke West-Indische Maildienst (KWIM, the "Royal West India Mail Service") and scrapped in 1927.

== Building ==
In November 1911, Stoomvaart Maatschappij Nederland ("Netherland Line", or SMN) ordered a pair of sister ships from different shipyards. Maatschappij voor Scheeps- en Werktuigbouw Fijenoord in Rotterdam built the first as yard number 254, launched her on 2 July 1913 as Koningin Emma, and completed her on 26 November that year. Nederlandsche Scheepsbouw Maatschappij built the second as yard number 123, launched her on 20 August 1913 as Prins der Nederlanden, and completed her in January 1914.

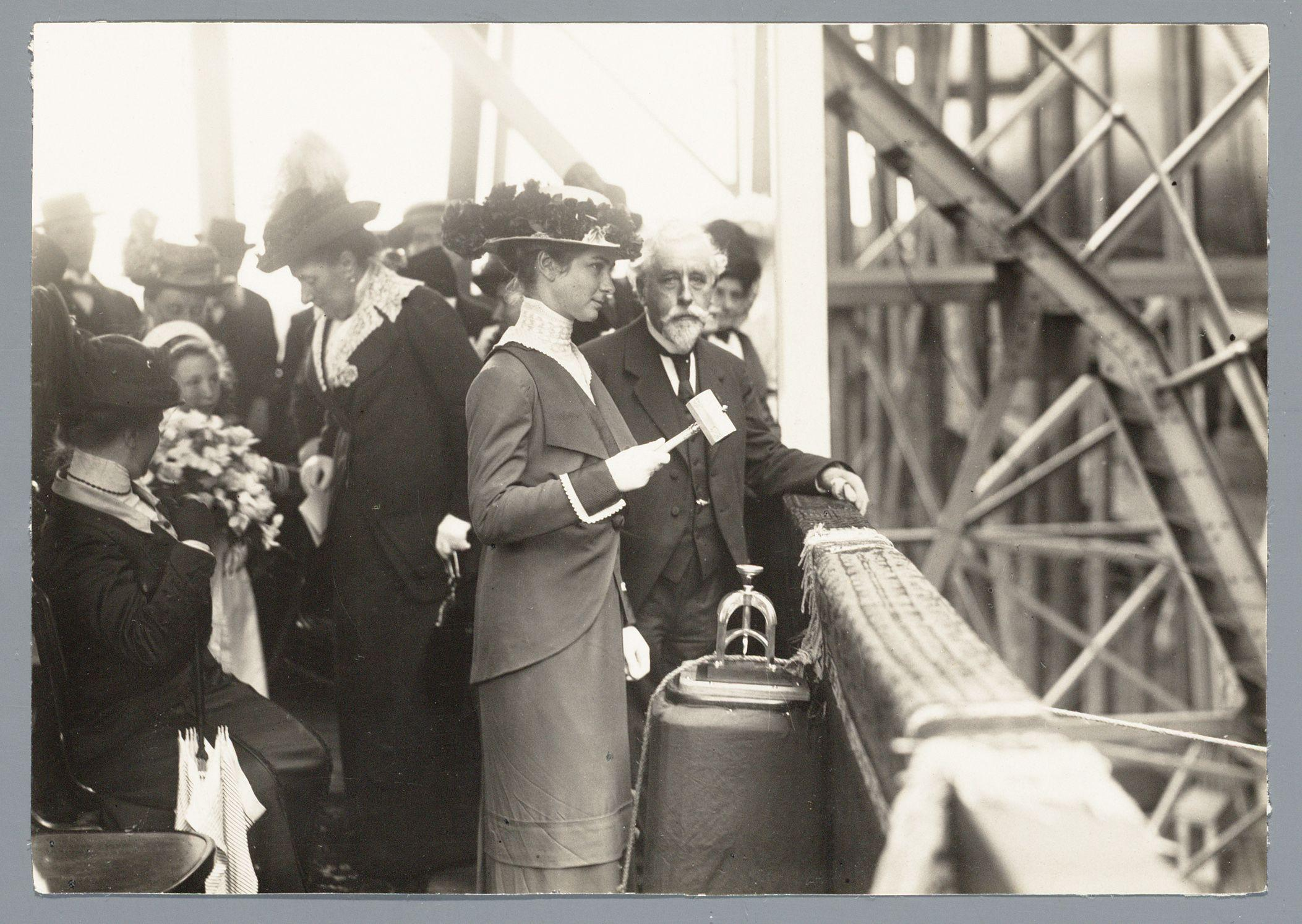
Miss EDW Jonckheere launching Prins der Nederlanden on 20 August 1913

Prins der Nederlanden's registered length was 481.0 ft (146.6 m), her beam was 57.2 ft (17.4 m) and her depth was 26.8 ft (8.2 m). Her tonnages were 9,322 GRT, 5,689 NRT, and 7,150 DWT. She had berths for 352 passengers: 140 in first class, 136 in second class, 34 in third class, and 42 in steerage. Her holds had capacity for 321,000 cubic feet (9,100 m^{3}) of grain, or 296,000 cubic feet (8,400 m^{3}) of baled cargo.

The ship had twin screws, each driven by a four-cylinder quadruple expansion steam engine built by Nederlandsche Fabriek van Werktuigen en Spoorwegmaterieel. The combined power of her twin engines was rated at 1,105 NHP or 7,000 ihp, and gave her a speed of 15 knots (28 km/h).

Koninigin Emma and Prins der Nederlanden were very similar to SMN's Prinses Juliana completed in 1910, and sister ship Koningin der Nederlanden completed in 1911. The two new ships were 8 feet (2.4 m) longer and had a beam 5 feet (1.5 m) greater, they had berths for more first- and second-class passengers, and their passenger superstructure was slightly larger.

== Prins der Nederlanden ==
SMN registered Prins der Nederlanden at Amsterdam. Her code letters were PQMS. She was equipped for submarine signalling and wireless telegraphy. Her wireless call sign was PFQ. Prins der Nederlanden joined Koningin Emma, Koningin der Nederlanden and Prinses Juliana on SMN's route between Amsterdam and Batavia via Southampton, Lisbon, Tangier, Algiers, Genoa, and the Suez Canal.

On 22 September 1915 a German mine sank Koningin Emma in the North Sea. On 21 March 1918 the Entente Powers seized Prinses Juliana and Koningin der Nederlanden under angary and had them converted into troop ships. The United States Customs Service also seized KWIM's Prins der Nederlanden. SMN's Prins der Nederlanden was not seized, although some sources confuse the two ships. KWIM's Prins der Nederlanden was 2,287 GRT, and like most of the smaller Dutch ships seized by the USCS, she was assigned to the United States Shipping Board's Emergency Fleet Corporation. Had the USCS seized SMN's Prins der Nederlanden, she would have been assigned to the United States Navy as a troop ship.

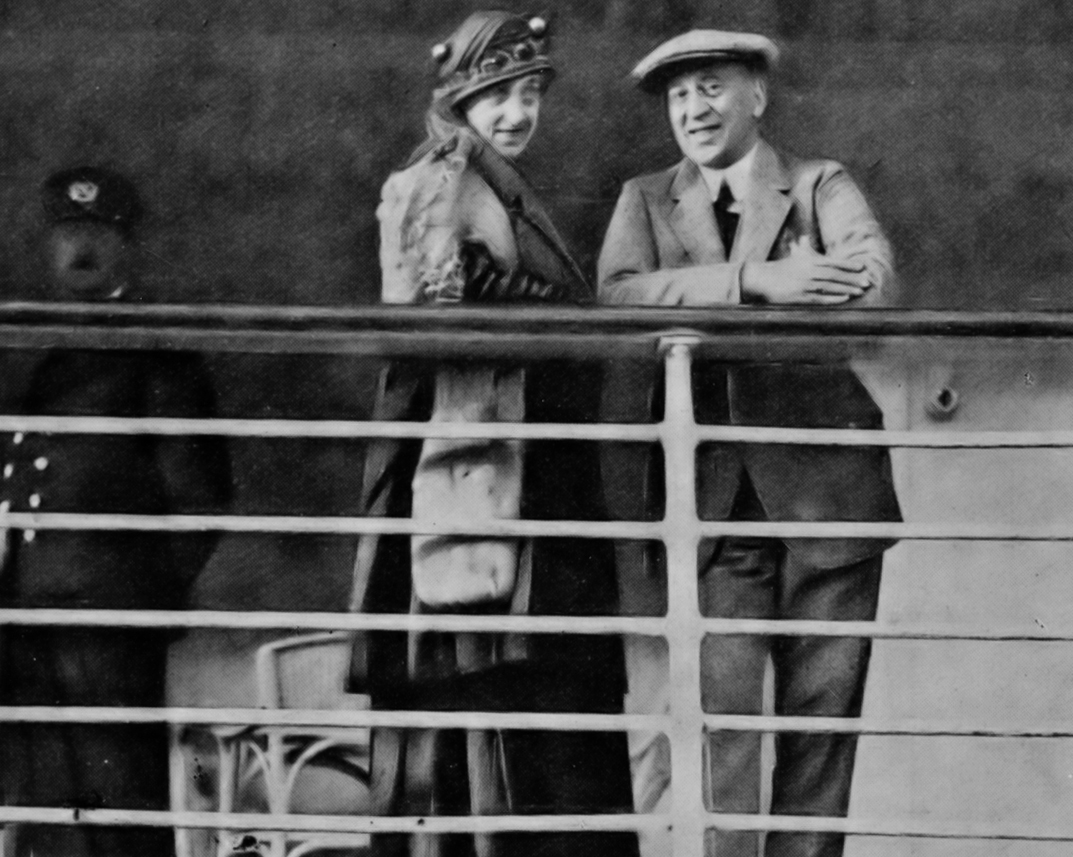
The Dutch writer Louis Couperus and his wife Elisabeth Couperus-Baud aboard Prins der Nederlanden in 1921

By 1927 the ship was equipped with wireless direction finding. As built, she had three double-ended and two single-ended boilers, with a total heating surface of 16,411 square feet (1,525 m^{2}). They were heated by a total of 24 corrugated furnaces, with a combined had a grate area of 400 square feet (37 m^{2}). However, in 1927 or 1928 this was increased to three double-ended and three single-ended boilers, with a total heating surface to 19,898 square feet (1,849 m^{2}). Her corrugated furnaces were increased to 27, with a total grate area of 465 square feet (43 m^{2}). These increased raised her power to 1,257 NHP.

By January 1928, Prins der Nederlanden's route between Amsterdam and Batavia was via Southampton, Algiers, Genoa, the Suez Canal, Colombo, Sabang, Belawan and Singapore. By May 1929, regular ports of call had been reduced to Amsterdam, Southampton, Algiers, and Genoa.

Between 1926 and 1930, SMN took delivery of a set of new motor ships: Pieter Corneliszoon Hooft in 1926, Christiaan Huygens in 1927–28, and Johan van Oldenbarnevelt and Marnix van Sint Aldegonde in 1930. This made older ships such as Prins der Nederlanden redundant, so she was laid up at Amsterdam. However, in November 1932 Pieter Corneliszoon Hooft was destroyed by fire in Amsterdam, despite the Amsterdam Fire Service's best efforts to save her. Hence from about 1933, the fire service used Prins der Nederlanden as a training ship, to learn how better to fight fires on ships.

In 1934 the call sign PGVH superseded Prins der Nederlanden's code letters PQMS.

== Aquileia ==
On 25 June 1935 Lloyd Triestino bought Prins der Nederlanden and renamed her Aquileia. She was registered in Genoa, and her call sign was IBEO. She was converted for use in the Italian invasion of Ethiopia, which began on 3 October that year. Between 1935 and 1937 she took 4,138 troops to Italian Eritrea and Italian Somaliland, and repatriated 4,473 wounded or sick to Italy.

In 1937 or 1938 Lloyd Triestino re-registered the ship in Trieste. In 1938 she was requisitioned again, this time for the Italian military intervention in Spain. Between March 1938 and June 1939 she made 11 voyages from Naples to Cádiz and back. She took 2,063 Corpo Truppe Volontarie troops to Spain and repatriated 5,571 wounded or sick.

=== Italian service in the Second World War ===
On 24 May 1940 Italy requisitioned Aquileia into the Regia Marina as a hospital ship, in preparation for Italy's entry into the Second World War on 10 June. Sources differ as to her capacity, but at this stage it may have been 670 beds.

On 9 December 1940 Aquileia was arriving in Bari from Albania. As she manoeuvred to moor, a strong wind blew her off-course. She collided with the Italian troop ship Sardinia, which in turn collided with the German cargo ship Ruhr. Aquileia's starboard side was badly damaged, and she spent 24 days being repaired.

On 3 December 1941, British torpedo bombers attacked Aquileia at sea. She narrowly avoided a British torpedo by turning sharply to starboard. On 3 September 1942, Allied torpedo bombers attacked her again, but she was undamaged. On 26 and 29 April 1943 she was attacked from the air again, this time by four-engined US aircraft. She sustained minor damage in both attacks.

Also on 29 April 1943, Allied air attacks cripped the German destroyer Hermes. Aquileia rescued 111 members of her crew.

On 7 May 1943, Aquileia and another Italian hospital ship, Virgilio, were evacuating wounded and medical personnel from Kelibia in Tunisia when twin-engined US aircraft attacked them. Later that day, the Royal Navy destroyers HMS Jervis, Nubian and Paladin stopped her. A boarding party inspected her and found no irregularities, but a Royal Navy officer advised Aquileia's Master that his ship "not be seen in these parts".

In August 1943 Aquileia and other Italian hospital ships made five voyages to evacuate Italians and Germans wounded in the Allied invasion of Sicily. British and US aircraft attacked her off Ganzirri in the Strait of Messina on 6 or 7 August, strafing the motor boats that were ferrying wounded from the beach to the ship. On 16 August, Allied aircraft strafed her off Gioia Tauro in Calabria.

By September 1943, Aquileia had made 84 voyages, which was more than any other Italian hospital ship. She had steamed 63,000 nautical miles (117,000 km), and carried a total of 12,799 wounded or shipwrecked personnel and 38,303 sick.

=== German service in the Second World War ===
When the Armistice of Cassibile in was announced on 8 September 1943, the ship was in La Spezia, in what became the Italian Social Republic. German forces seized her and used her as a hospital ship, with 200 medical personnel, and beds for 860 patients.

In October 1943 Aquileia took part in prisoner exchanges, sailing to Oran in Algeria, and taking hundreds of New Zealand prisoners from Marseille to Barcelona in Spain. She also carried troops between Italy and German-occupied France.

On 15 December 1943 Aquileia was in Marseille during an air raid. She was hit, caught fire, and sank at her moorings. On 16 February 1944 German forces raised her and began to recondition her. However, on 6 June 1944 the Allies landed in Normandy, and on 26 June the Germans scuttled Aquileia as a blockship in Marseille. In 1946 her wreck was raised, and in 1947 she was scrapped.

== Bibliography ==
- Cernuschi, Ernesto; Brescia, Maurizio; Bagnasco, Erminio (2010). Le Navi Ospedale Italiane 1935–1945 (in Italian). Albertelli. ISBN 978-8887372861.
- Lloyd's Register of Shipping. Vol. I.–Steamers. London: Lloyd's Register of Shipping. 1914 – via Internet Archive.
- Lloyd's Register of Shipping. Vol. II.–Steamers and Motorships. London: Lloyd's Register of Shipping. 1927 – via Internet Archive.
- Lloyd's Register of Shipping (PDF). Vol. II.–Steamers and motorships of 300 Tons Gross and Over. London: Lloyd's Register of Shipping. 1934 – via Southampton City Council.
- Lloyd's Register of Shipping (PDF). Vol. II.–Steamers and Motorships Over 300 Tons. London: Lloyd's Register of Shipping. 1936 – via Southampton City Council.
- Lloyd's Register of Shipping (PDF). Vol. II.–Steamers and Motorships of 300 Tons Gross and Over. London: Lloyd's Register of Shipping. 1937 – via Southampton City Council.
- The Marconi Press Agency Ltd (1914). The Year Book of Wireless Telegraphy and Telephony. London: The Marconi Press Agency Ltd.
- Mason, W Wynne (1954). Prisoners of War. Official History of New Zealand in the Second World War 1939-45. Wellington: Department of Internal Affairs – via Victoria University of Wellington.
