= Footsteps of Fate =

Novel by Louis Couperus

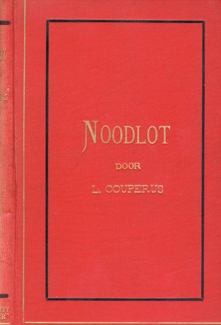
- Book cover of Footsteps of Fate
- Author: Louis Couperus
- Original title: 'Noodlot'
- Translator: Clara Bell
- Language: Dutch
- Publisher: Elsevier, in England with Heinemann's International Library
- Publication date: 1891
- Publication place: Netherlands
- English publication date: 1891

Footsteps of Fate (Dutch: Noodlot) is a novel written by Louis Couperus and published in 1891. Footsteps of Fate was first published in the Dutch magazine "De Gids" (October 1890). In 1891 the novel was translated into English by Clara Bell and published under the title Footsteps of Fate. The first two Dutch editions were published by Elsevier (in 1891 and 1893); the second to eighth editions were published by L. J. Veen, except for the sixth edition, which was published by De Samenwerkende Uitgevers. The English translation was published with Heinemann's International Library, under the authority of Edmund Gosse. His attention was drawn to this book by Maarten Maartens.

== Book and play ==
The novel tells the story of two lovers, Frank and Eve. They become separated as a result of the intrigues of Frank's childhood friend, Bertie. Bertie, who has become down and out, has met Frank again in London by coincidence and now lives together with him. Because Bertie is afraid of losing Frank's attention, he makes Frank believe that Eve is no longer true to him by hiding the letters Eve writes to Frank. When Frank finally finds out the truth, he kills Bertie in a fit of anger, after which he is imprisoned for several years. Eventually, Frank and Eve commit suicide together by taking in poison.

The story in part takes place in Trondheim and surroundings.

== Publications ==
Footsteps of Fate was published by Elsevier after publisher P.N. van Kampen refused the novel. The reason for this refusal was that the owner of P.N. van Kampen found the content of Footsteps of Fate not consistent with his religious belief. After an English translation was made by Clara Bell, Footsteps of Fate got a bad review in the English newspaper "Saturday Review". In the review, it was said that Louis Couperus was a typical sensitivist. The murder scene of the book was described as: One eye was a shapeless mass, half pulp and jelly; the other stared out of the oval socket, like a large dull melancholy opal. We presume that the account of the shapeless eye avoids the vagaries of impressionism and that of the opal eye the brutality of naturalism. A more morbid, an uglier or a sillier story we have not read for a long time.

== Adaptation ==
Footsteps of Fate was made into a play (drama in three acts) by Gerrit Jäger and performed on stage at the Tivoli-Theater in Rotterdam in 1892. In 1893, it was performed at the Van Lier Theater in Rotterdam. The reviewer in "Het Nieuws van de Dag" was not amused by the play and wrote: it may be fashionable for moonstruck youngsters and abnormal young and old ladies; those who still have some common sense will be cured after they have seen this theatrical performance of "Footsteps of Fate". The Dutch stage critic A.C. Loffelt wrote that if he had been responsible for the dramatization of Footsteps of Fate he would have bought a gun and shot himself morally.

== Other reviews ==
Not only the play received a bad review; a critic wrote in the "Leeuwarder Courant" about the book: The book made me resentful and when I finished it I felt like someone who had scrupulously fulfilled a heavy-duty until the end. Another critic wrote: I feel aversion when I read about young people in an area of weakness and effeminacy, spiritual opium smokers, who love each other as women do, put their head into each others lap and call that weakness faith. On the occasion of the publication of Eline Vere and Footsteps of Fate in February 1891 in an extraordinary meeting of the Association of Dutch Teachers, a lecture was held about fatal determinism. In this meeting, J. van Loenen Martinet described the fatalism in the novels of Couperus as a symptom of a disease that consisted of a determinism that denied the facts of moral life.

Oscar Wilde however was very impressed by Footsteps of Fate and wrote Louis Couperus a letter to compliment him with his novel. As a result of this contact the wife of Couperus, Elisabeth Couperus-Baud, received an order to translate Wilde's The Picture of Dorian Gray into Dutch. Present-day literature scientists believe that Couperus was inspired by Henrik Ibsen's Gespenster when writing Eline Vere and Footsteps of Fate. They also think that the character of Frank was based on that of Johan Hendrik Ram, a military figure Couperus knew very well (assumptions have been made, in particular by Frédéric Bastet, that Couperus and Ram once had a love affair).

== Gallery ==
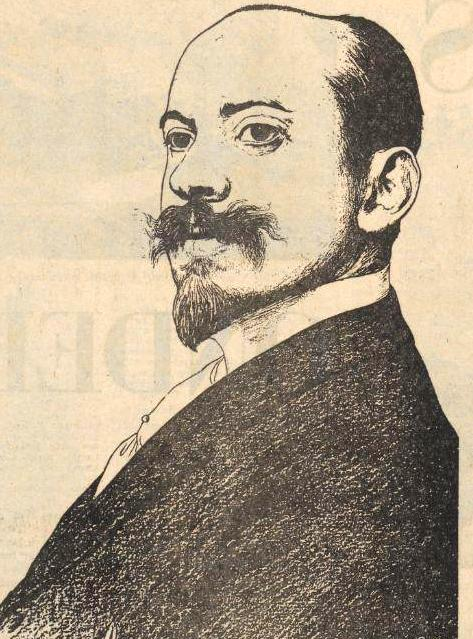
Louis Couperus was the author of Footsteps of Fate

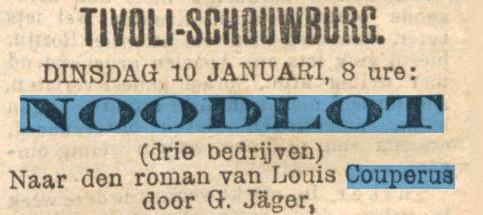
Advert for the play

Bookcover of the fifth edition (1918)

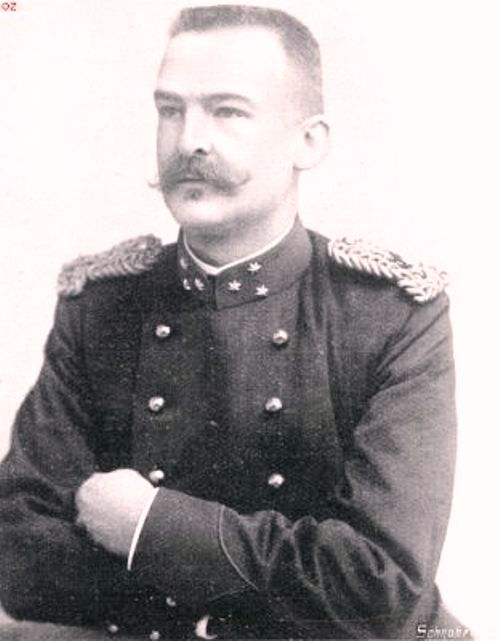
Johan Hendrik Ram; present day scientists believe that the character of Frank was based on that of Ram
