= Schimmen van schoonheid =

Book by Louis Couperus

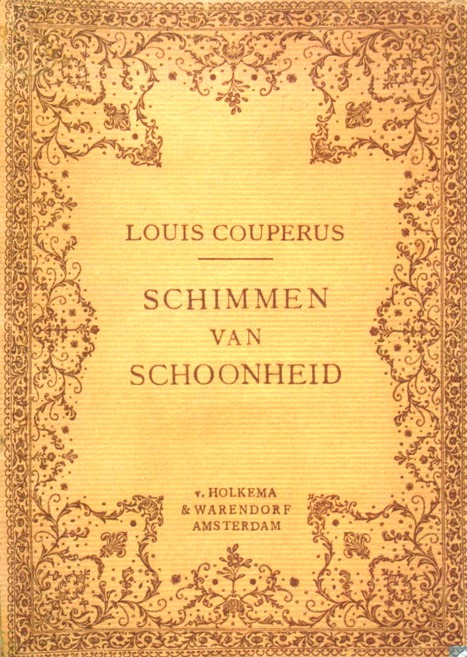
- Cover of Schimmen van schoonheid
- Author: Louis Couperus
- Original title: 'Schimmen van schoonheid'
- Language: Dutch
- Publisher: Van Holkema & Warendorf
- Publication date: 1912
- Publication place: Netherlands
- Pages: 236

Schimmen van schoonheid (English "Shades of beauty") is a collection of short stories, written by Louis Couperus and published by Van Holkema & Warendorf in 1912. It is not known how many copies were printed for the first edition, but this edition was in any case sold out by 1929. The second edition was published in 1962 by Querido in the so-called Salamander series (number 71).

== Description ==
For the stories in Couperus' book Schimmen van schoonheid Couperus was inspired by classical antiquity and classical mythology. The story De Nacht van Ishthâr is about an Assyrian relief, such as that of Ashurbanipal in the British Museum, which comes to life. The story Frynè represents the triumph of the sensuous beauty, as personified in Phryne. The short story De Doop deals with the conversion of emperor Constantine the Great to Christianity, while De Gladiator takes place in the gladiator school in Ravenna. These two were first published in Het Vaderland. The short story De Obsessie deals with Otto III, who longs for his bride and Het Raadsel is about the visit of the Queen of Sheba to King Solomon. Couperus first offered many short stories, to be published in two books, Schimmen van schoonheid and De zwaluwen neêrgestreken, to his publisher L. J. Veen. When Veen refused to accept Couperus' proposal these books were finally published by Van Holkema en Warendorf.

== Critical reception ==
Couperus' book received a good review by the critic of Het Nieuws van de Dag: "Nobody else but Couperus knows how, by the sound of language and the color of description, to bring life into his characters and stories. He remains a virtuous in the use of words, unique in the Netherlands." In the Algemeen Handelsblad another critic wrote: "It is written down with smooth routine, bitter false and rotten of humanity." In De Gids a very negative review was published and Couperus was called "a mediocre student of Lawrence Alma-Tadema".

In 1965, when the second edition was published, a critic of the Gereformeerde Gezinsblad wrote: "As soon as one reads the first sentence of the story one is placed in a completely different time. The world of the literature of Couperus is refined and somewhat decadent." The Leeuwarder Courant wrote that same year: "All the characteristics of his gentleman style are present here. He is airy, lighthearted and ironic." In 1930 actrice Ellen Verano read out the story De Naumachie during a meeting of the Louis Couperus Genootschap. In 1952 Albert Vogel jr, son of Albert Vogel sr., read out Couperus' story De Naumachie during a meeting in Groningen, on the occasion of the publication of the Collected Works of Louis Couperus. In 1953 during a meeting of the Dutch association of housewives Mrs. A.C. Bleeker also read out some stories from Couperus' book.

== Stories ==
- De Nacht van Ishthâr ("Night of Ishtar")
- Het Raadsel ("The puzzle")
- Frynè ("Phryne")
- De Apotheoze ("The apotheosis")
- De Gladiator ("The gladiator")
- De Naumachie ("The Naumachia")
- De Doop ("The baptism")
- De Meditatie ("The meditation")
- De Obsessie ("The obsession")
- Uit de jeugd van San Francesco van Assisi ("From the youth of Francis of Assisi")
- De Bezitting van Messer Donato ("The estate of Messer Donato")
- De Samenzwering ("The conspiracy")
- Benvenuto
- Maskers ("Masks")
- Liefde, Wraak en Bloed ("Love, revenge and blood")
- Lucrezia
- Het Laatste Venijn ("The last venom")
- De Laatste Ure ("The last hour")
