= Inevitable (novel) =

Novel by Louis Couperus

The Inevitable, The Law Inevitable or Inevitable, (Dutch: Langs lijnen van geleidelijkheid, literally Along lines of graduality) is a novel by Dutch author Louis Couperus, published in 1900. It was first translated into English by Alexander Teixeira de Mattos and published in New York in 1920 by Dodd Mead and Company, and in London ('The Law Inevitable', 1921) by Thornton Butterworth. Both editions were reprinted once in 1921. In 2005, a new edition was published by Pushkin Press, New York, titled 'Inevitable' without the definite article.

It tells the story of a 23-year-old Dutch divorcee, Cornélie de Retz van Loo, from an upper-class The Hague background who seeks to start a new emancipated, culturally fulfilling life in Italy.

In Britain the novel's erotic explicitness and the social issues it deals with provoked significant criticism upon its publication.
