= Elisabeth Couperus-Baud =

Dutch translator

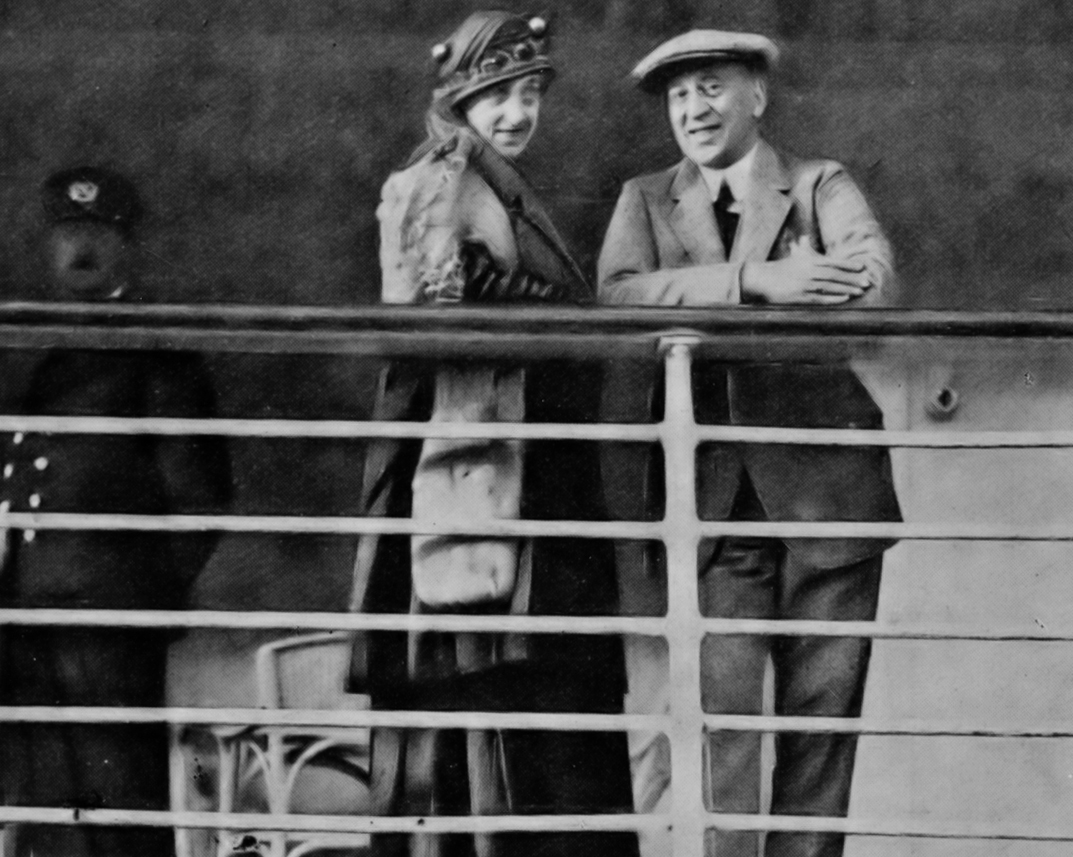
- Elisabeth Couperus-Baud with her husband Louis Couperus in 1921
- Born: Elisabeth Wilhelmina Johanna Baud; 30 October 1867; Batavia, Dutch East Indies
- Died: 18 March 1960 (aged 92); The Hague, Netherlands
- Occupation: Translator
- Years active: 1887–1940

Elisabeth Wilhelmina Johanna (Betty) Couperus-Baud (Batavia, 30 October 1867 – The Hague, 18 March 1960), was a Dutch translator. She was the wife of the Dutch writer Louis Couperus (1863–1923).

== Biography ==
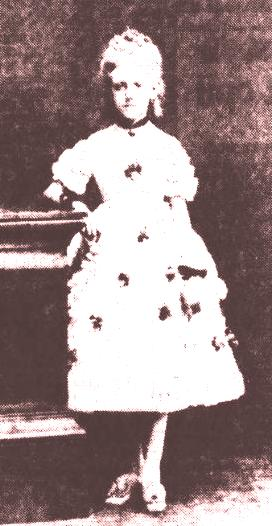
Elisabeth Couperus-Baud as a child

Couperus-Baud was the daughter of Jan Carel Willem Ricus Theodore Baud (1838–1883), an assistant resident at Meester Cornelis (Dutch East Indies) and his cousin Johanna Wilhelmina Petronella Steenstra Toussaint (1844–1927). In 1890 she published, in the Dutch magazine "Nederland", a short story called Een galavoorstelling. She married in 1891 her cousin, Louis Couperus, son of John Ricus Couperus (1816–1902) and jkvr. Catharina Geertruida Reynst (1829–1893). Louis Couperus wrote about Elisabeth Couperus-Baud in his novel De zwaluwen neergestreken: We are cousins and played together as children. We still own photographs of ourselves together, when we were young. In 1893 Louis Couperus received a letter from Oscar Wilde, in which he was complemented with his novel Noodlot; this book was translated into English by Clara Bell.

As a result of the correspondence Elisabeth Couperus-Baud was asked to translate Wilde's book The Picture of Dorian Gray. After her marriage to Louis Couperus, Couperus-Baud was active as a critic of her husband's work and made readable copies of his handwritings. In time Couperus-Baud made numerous translations; she translated French, German, English, Spanish and Italian manuscripts. To her publisher, L.J. Veen, she wrote: everything you want ("Comme vous voulez"). In 1899 she wrote the first of what had to become a series of travel letters in the Dutch magazine Hollandia, however only one letter was published. From 1915 onwards, when she and her husband had returned from their stay abroad, Couperus-Baud edited manuscripts and changed them into plays that could be performed on stage.

After the death of Louis Couperus the "Louis Couperus Genootschap" was founded in 1928 (in Hilversum). Chairman of the foundation was writer Henri van Booven, while Elisabeth Couperus-Baud was appointed chairman of honor. After the death of her husband she took his place as a member of the board of directors of the Dutch magazine "Groot Nederland". She died as a poor widow in a pension in The Hague, owned by Mrs. Stracker and Mrs. Teillers and her ashes were buried at the cemetery Oud Eik en Duinen in The Hague.

From October 2001 – April 2002 an exhibition about Elisabeth Couperus-Baud was held in and organized by the Louis Couperus Museum. Special attention was paid to Couperus-Bauds marriage with a suspected gay husband and her way of dealing with this. In 2007 a novel, written by Sophie Zijlstra, called Mevrouw Couperus, was published. Dutch writer Gerard Reve wrote about her: She had to endure quite a lot (in a lecture he held called "Het geheim van Louis Couperus" (The secret of Louis Couperus)) and Frédéric Bastet, biographer of Couperus, said: Zij kwam veel tekort (she could not live life to the fullest).

== Work ==
=== Letters ===
- (in Dutch) Dear sir. Brieven van het echtpaar Couperus aan Oscar Wilde (Dear Sir, letters from mrs. and mr. Couperus to Oscar Wilde), edited by Caspar Wintermans. Woubrugge, 2003
- (in Dutch) Een brief aan W. J. Simons (A letter to W.J. Simons), edited by Menno Voskuil. Woubrugge, 2010

=== Translations ===
- (in Dutch) Oscar Wilde, Het portret van Dorian Gray (The picture of Dorian Gray). Amsterdam, 1893 (under the name of mrs. Louis Couperus)
- (in Dutch) George Moore, IJdel geld (Idle money). Amsterdam, 1895 (under the name of mrs. Louis Couperus; with a foreword from Louis Couperus)
- (in Dutch) A.T. Quiller-Couch, De schoone slaapster en andere sprookjes (Sleeping Beauty and other fairytales). Amsterdam, 1911 (under the name of Elizabeth Couperus)
- (in Dutch) Hermann Bahr, Principes (Principles) (1913) (a play)
- (in Dutch) Carl Sternheim, De snob (The snob) (1915) (a play)
- (in Dutch) Pio Baroja, Op een dwaalweg (On a crossroad) Amsterdam, 1915 (under the name of Elizabeth Couperus; with a foreword from Louis Couperus)
- (in Dutch) Valentino Soldani, Nacht van laag en list Tragikomedie in drie bedrijven (Night of intrigues). Amsterdam, 1915 (under the name of Elizabeth Couperus)
- (in Dutch) J. Hartley Manners, Peggy, mijn kind (Peggy, dear child) (1915) (a play).
- (in Dutch) Horace Annesley Vachell, Wie is het? Een spel voor jongeren (Who is it? A play voor boys) (1916) (a play).
- (in Dutch) Giovanni Papini, fragments of his work Un uomo finito (as Een man die op is) (A man who is at his end) (1917); the fragments were published in the newspaper Het Vaderland
- (in Dutch) Albert M. Treynor, Op patrouille. (On patrol), Rotterdam, 1931
- (in Dutch) Stanislas-André Steeman, De nacht van 12 op 13 (The night of the 12th to the 13th). Rotterdam, about 1932

=== Other ===
- (in Dutch) Een galavoorstelling (A gala evening), published in 1890 (under the name of "Betty") in "Nederland" (Dutch magazine)
- (in Dutch) Psyche. Een spel van de ziel in tien tafereelen (Psyche, a play of the soul). Amsterdam, 1916 (after Louis Couperus' Psyche)
- (in Dutch) Eline Vere. Toneelspel in vier bedrijven. Naar den roman van Louis Couperus. Amsterdam, 1918
