= Henri van Booven =

Dutch writer and journalist

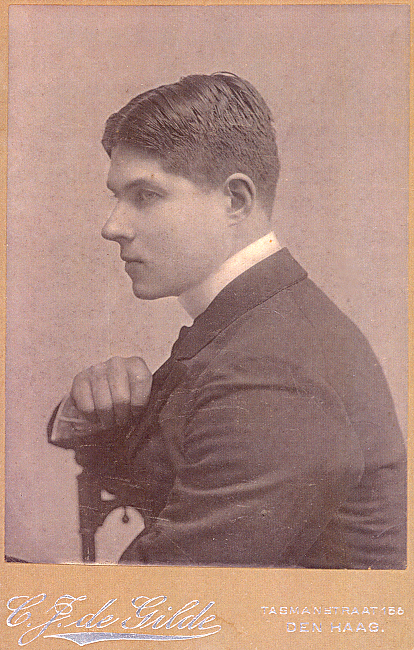
Henri van Booven

Hendrik Cornelis Alexander (Henri) van Booven (17 July 1877 in Haarlem – 31 January 1964 in The Hague) was a Dutch writer and journalist. His most successful work was the novel Tropenwee (Tropical agony, 1904), a thinly veiled autobiographical literary report of a mission to Congo in 1898, somewhat similar to Heart of Darkness.

Friend of the symbolist artist Karel de Nerée tot Babberich and the writer Louis Couperus, whose biography he would write (Leven en werken van Louis Couperus, 1933), he was also an important sportsman, especially in rugby, cricket, and hockey.

== Works (selection) ==
- Witte Nachten (1901) ('White Nights')
- Tropenwee (1904)
- Van de Vereering des Levens (1906)
- Sproken (1907)
- De Fraaie Comedie (1912)
