= Clara Bell =

English translator

Clara Courtenay Bell (née Poynter; 1835–1927) was an English translator fluent in French, German, Danish, Dutch, Italian, Norwegian, Russian, and Spanish, noted for her translations of works by Balzac, Casanova, Huysmans, Ibsen, and Maupassant, as well as by Louis Couperus, Georg Ebers, Benito Pérez Galdós, Ernst Haeckel, Pierre Loti, Helmuth von Moltke, and others. She was educated in France, where she became fluent in French and German; she did not acquire her knowledge of the other languages until after her fortieth birthday. She spent most of her life in London.

Clara Poynter was born in Westminster to architect Ambrose Poynter and Emma Forster; her brother was Sir Edward Poynter, a director of the National Gallery. She was a distant relation of Edward Burne-Jones and Rudyard Kipling. She was married to banker Robert Courtenay Bell (1816–1896), with whom she had six children. One of her sons was Charles Francis Bell, who oversaw the Fine Art Department of the Ashmolean Museum in Oxford and another was Edmund Hamilton Bell, first curator of the John G. Johnson Collection at what is now the Philadelphia Museum of Art.

Under the direction of George Saintsbury, Bell, Ellen Marriage, and Rachel Scott were responsible for translating the vast majority of Balzac's Human Comedy into English, superseding earlier translations that had generally been regarded as stilted. The low pay that translators received at that time required Bell and her colleagues to complete work quickly, but her translations have nonetheless been noted for their close adherence to the source texts, and their high degree of readability.

According to an entry in Book News in 1890: "The productions [i.e. translations] she values most are her scientific works, much of which she did for Professor Thistleton Dyer and other English botanists, and for Professor Richter's great work of the notebooks of Leonardo da Vinci, until then unpublished. This had to be done from the original MSS [manuscripts] in the cramped and minute handwriting of the great artist, all of which, to add to the difficulty, was written backwards."
