= A ribbon of poems =

Poetry collection by Louis Couperus

A Ribbon of Poems
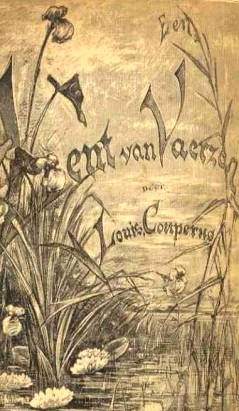
- Cover of A Ribbon of Poems made by Ludwig Willem Reymert Wenckebach
- Author: Louis Couperus
- Original title: Een lent van Vaerzen
- Language: Dutch
- Publisher: J.L. Beijers (Utrecht), second edition L.J. Veen (1893)
- Publication date: 1886
- Publication place: Netherlands
- Pages: 96

A ribbon of poems (Dutch: Een lent van vaerzen) was the literary debut of Dutch writer Louis Couperus. The collection of poetry A ribbon of poems (23 poems) received a good review by critic J.H. van Hall in the Dutch literary magazine "The Gids"; Van Hall compared Couperus' poetry with those written by Heinrich Heine, Everhardus Johannes Potgieter and Pieter Corneliszoon Hooft; Jan ten Brink, Couperus' teacher and later professor at the University of Leiden drew comparisons with Constantijn Huygens. Not every critic however was that positive; Couperus' debut was also termed "contrived and effeminate".

== Description ==
=== History ===
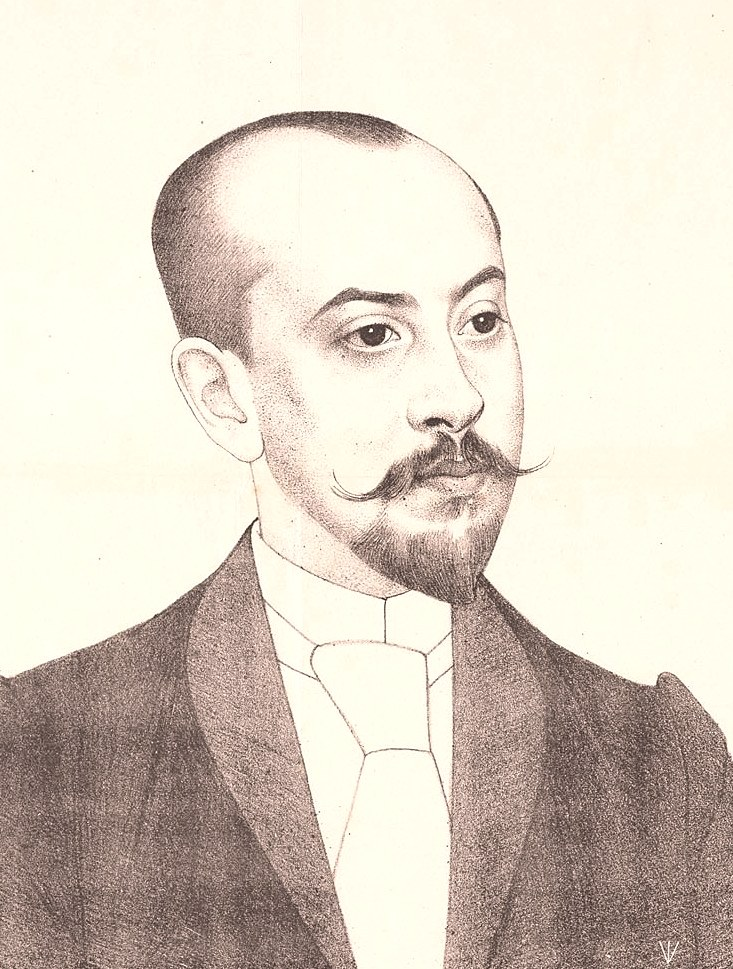
Louis Couperus

Couperus started to write poetry while studying with professor Jan ten Brink. While writing the poems for A ribbon of poems Couperus was inspired by poets from classical antiquity. He wrote most of the poems while living with his father, John Ricus Couperus, mother and brothers and sisters at the Nassauplein in The Hague in 1882-1883. The tone of the poetry was called Carpe Diem by Couperus' later biographer Frédéric Bastet. One of the longer poems in A ribbon of poems is called Gedroomd minnen (loving while dreaming); in this poem a sculptor keeps a sculpture of a beautiful woman hidden in his closet. When he is caught by a student he claims that his ideal image of a woman is not an earthly one. This is a well known pattern derived from Petrarch (Laura). A ribbon of poems consists not only of pure poetry but includes also five sketches in the form of poetry from which the one about the sculptor is one. The others are called Midnight (Middernacht), Four sonnets (Vier sonetten), Kleopatra and Tame (Getemd). Other forms of poetry that are used in this book are lyrical expressions and sonnets.

During the six years after A ribbon of poems was published about 100 copies were sold. The first edition consisted of sewed books, printed by printer Joh. Enschedé and sons. The cover was designed by Ludwig Willem Reymert Wenckebach. The cover of the second edition, which was published by L.J. Veen in 1893, was designed by P. de Josselin de Jong, made after an idea of Louis Couperus and printed by printer H.C.A. Thieme (Nijmegen). Of this edition of about 350-500 copies, in 1905 135 still remained with the publisher, who let 25 copies bind in a blue cover with red page cuts. L.J. Veen acquired the right to publish Couperus' poetry editions A ribbon of poems and Orchids in 1892 and announced a reprint of A ribbon of poems in December of that same year. After he was notified Couperus wrote to Veen: "If you like my poetry that much what would you say if we publish another book with verses"; he wanted to include the poems called Fragment (renamed to Melancholy) Viviane, Williswinde, Ginevra, Semiramis and Fragments from the Apocapyps of John the Apostle. Veen however refused this offer because he was not interested in an enlarged reprint of Orchids. At the beginning of December 1894 Couperus informed Veen that he agreed with a reprint of Orchids and a new book with the rest of his verses for the sum of 200 guilders.

=== After publication ===
Albert Vogel sr. used the poem The death of Kleopatra from A ribbon of poems during his performances in 1907. In May 1912 the text of the poem Midnight was put to music by J.P.J. Wiertz for the national singing contest of the Royal National Singing School in The Hague. A newspaper called A ribbon of poems in 1912 as a bad example for then contemporary poets who "tried to write their own A ribbon of poems". On the other hand: when Dutch poet Pieter Cornelis Boutens celebrated his 60th birthday in 1930, Het Nieuws van de Dag voor Nederlands-Indië wrote: Boutens is a poet as not many can be found in a country that since half a century is experiencing "a ribbon of poems". When the complete works of Louis Couperus were published in fifty volumes during the period 1987-1996 one of the first volumes included A ribbon of poems.
