= Louis Couperus Museum =

Coordinates: 52°9′28″N 4°18′28″E

The Louis Couperus Museum was a museum located in the Archipelbuurt neighbourhood of The Hague. The museum celebrated the life and work of the Belle Époque writer Louis Couperus. On 15 May 2024 the museum closed due to lack of funding.

== Location ==
The museum was founded in 1996 by Caroline de Westenholz, stepdaughter of Albert Vogel jr. (1924–1982), a biographer of Couperus, and housed in his former art gallery. The museum, which was located at Javastraat 17, was within walking distance of a number of addresses where Louis Couperus lived, including:

- Mauritskade, where Couperus was born in 1863.
- Nassauplein 4, which served as the residence of the Couperus family from 1878 to 1893. It was here that Couperus wrote the poems that would form part of his debut anthology Een lent van vaerzen.
- Surinamestraat 20, where Couperus wrote his debut novel, Eline Vere. Later, this was the home of writer, lawyer, and politician Conrad Theodor van Deventer. It was intended to move the Louis Couperus Museum to this place, but because the Foundation Couperushuis Surinamestraat could not raise enough funds to buy the house, it is still for sale. Permission to place a commemorative plaque on the house was not granted.

== The museum ==
The museum housed various objects related to Couperus, such as manuscripts and personal belongings. The rooms were stylistically designed to give the impression of how the residence would have appeared in Couperus' day and age. It featured Couperus' desk, and a portrait of his father, John Ricus Couperus. Twice a year the museum organised exhibitions on themes concerning Couperus' work or life. In addition to the themed exhibitions, the museum organised walking-tours along places of significance to Couperus and his work, such as the houses where characters from his novels lived.

Couperus' desk, manuscripts and personal letters formed part of the collection of the Letterkundig Museum. Other items, such as Couperus' collected publications and a life-sized mannequin of Couperus, belonged to the collection of the museum itself.

== See also ==
Images

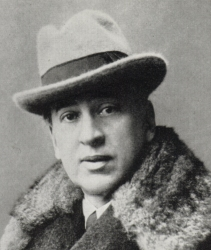
Louis Couperus

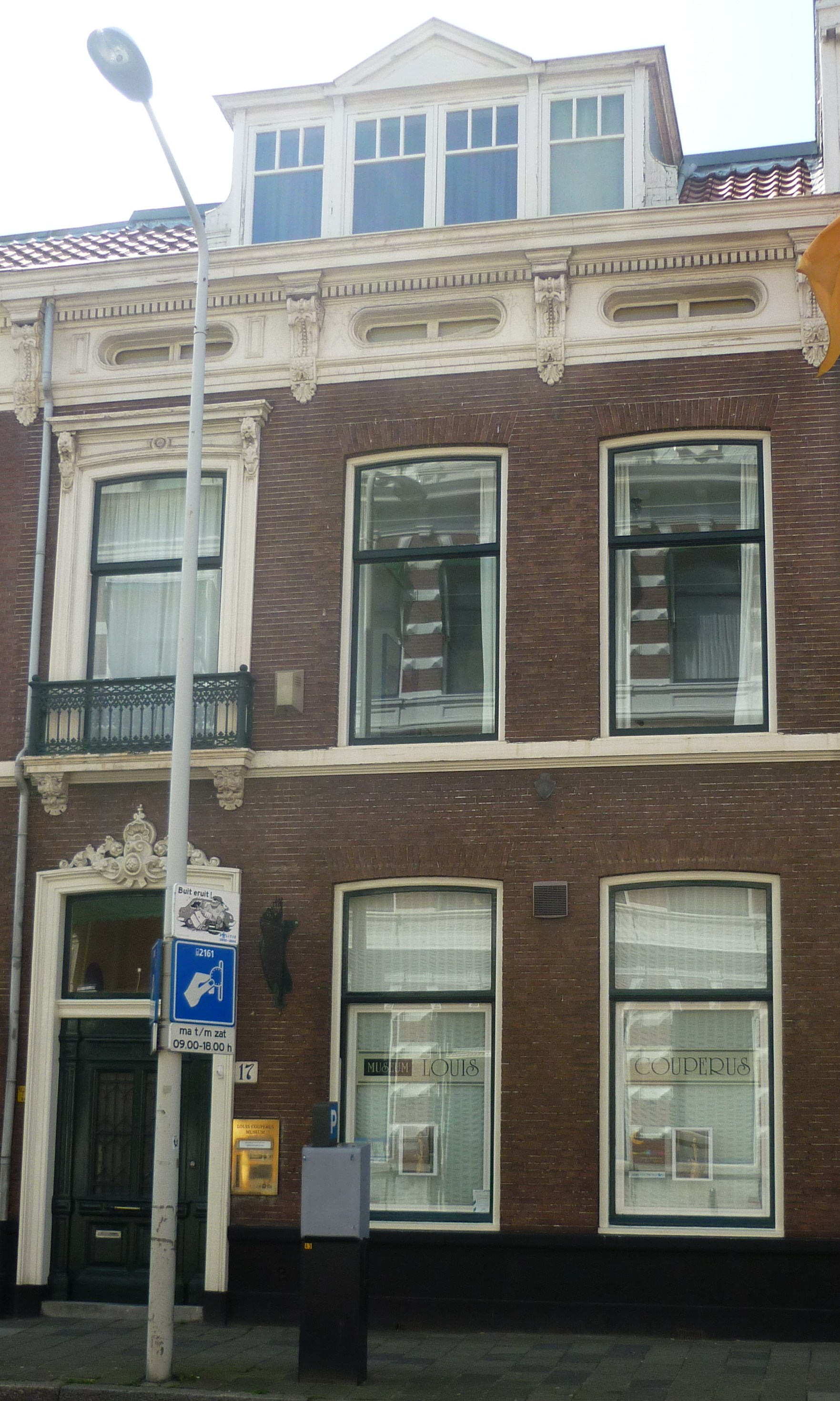
Javastraat 17

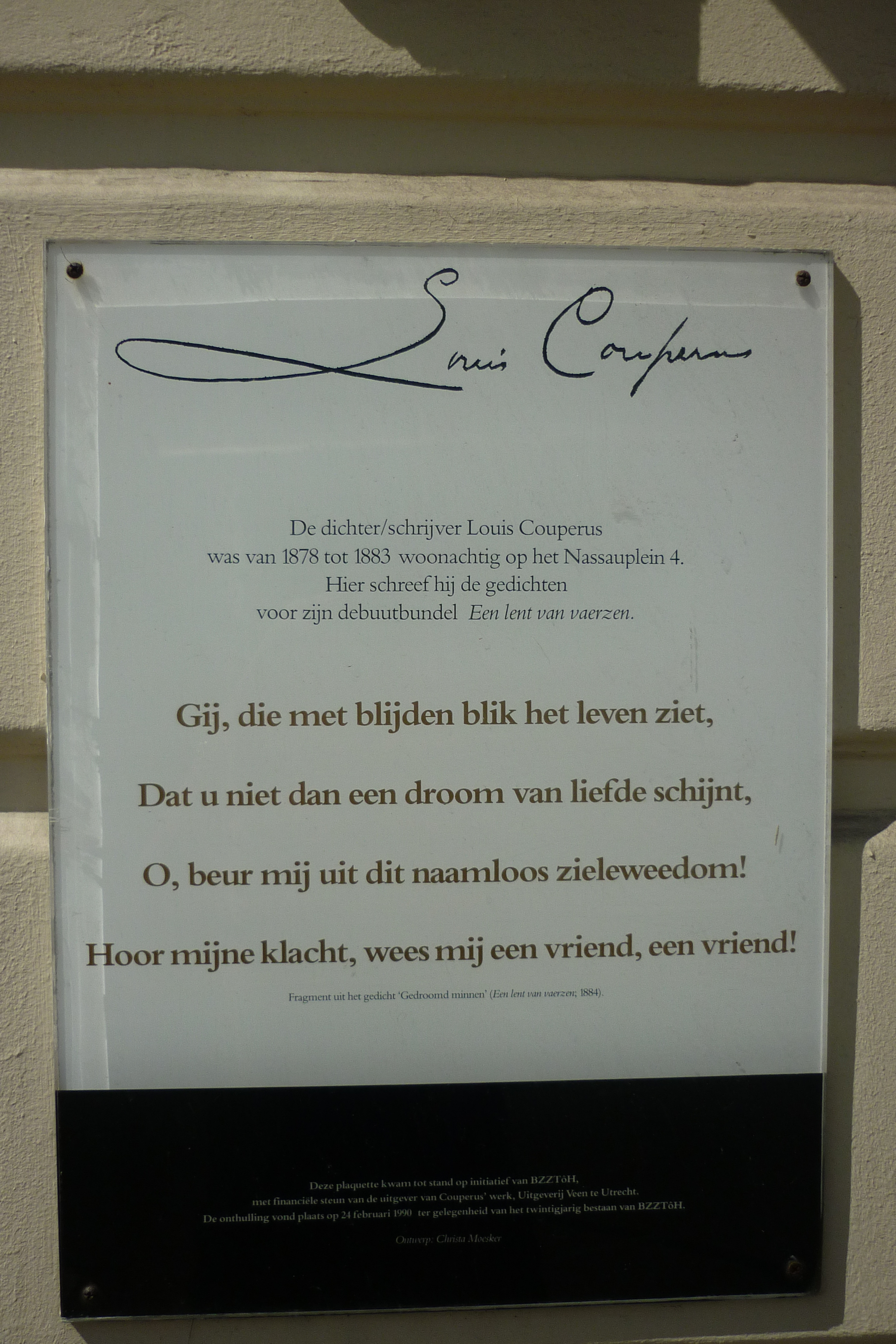
Louis Couperus Museum

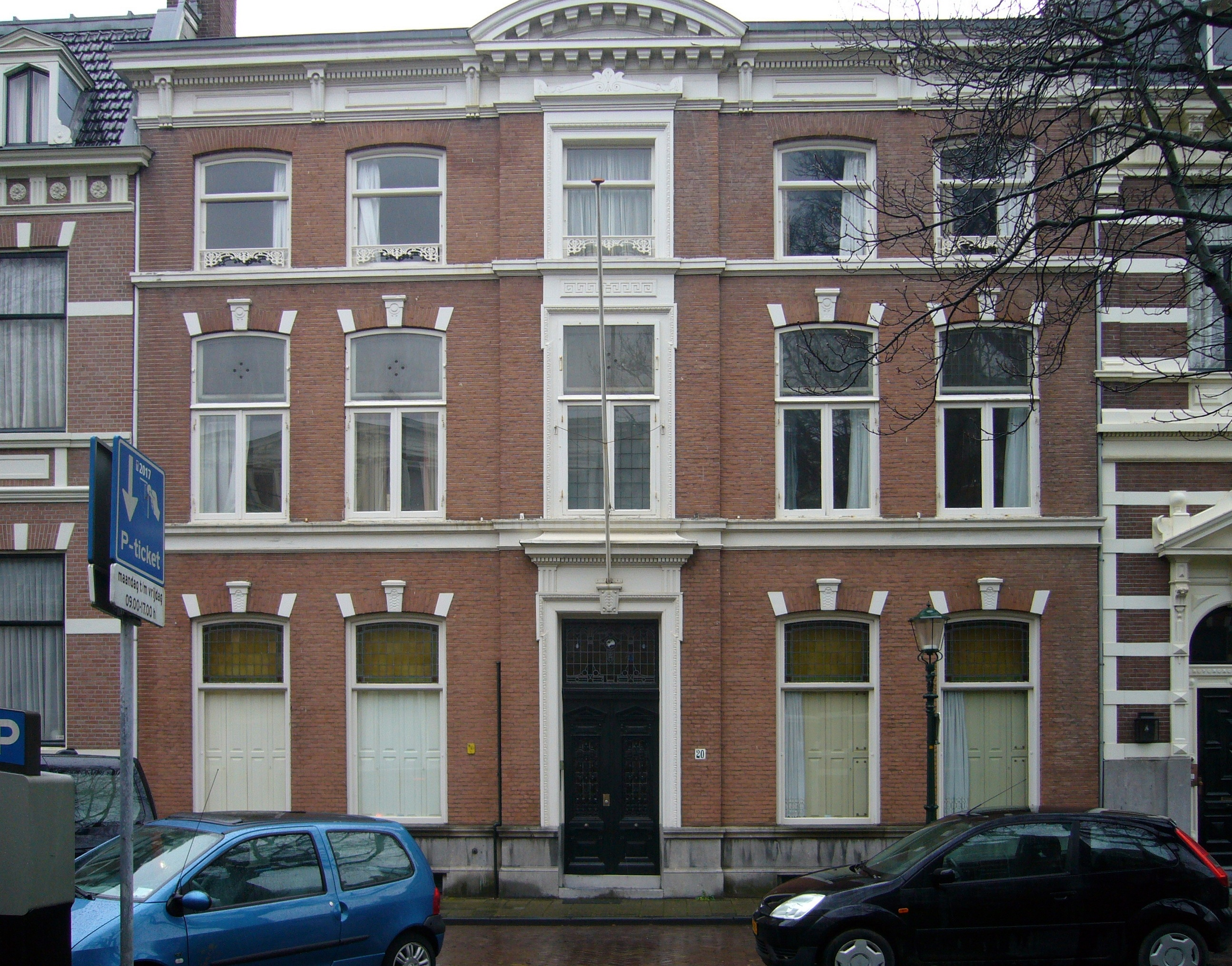
Surinamestraat 20
