= Orchids, a collection of prose and poetry =

Poetry collection by Louis Couperus

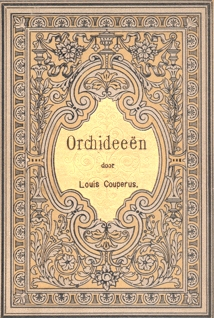
- Cover of Orchids
- Author: Louis Couperus
- Original title: 'Orchideeën, een bundel proza en poëzie'
- Language: Dutch
- Publisher: A. Rössing
- Publication date: 1886
- Publication place: Netherlands
- Pages: 216

Orchids, a collection of prose and poetry (Dutch: Orchideeën, een bundel proza en poëzie) is a collection of prose and poetry written by Dutch writer Louis Couperus, which was published in 1886. Couperus published his debut, A ribbon of poems (Dutch: Een lent van vaerzen) in 1886 with publisher J.L. Beijers. The rights to publish Couperus' books were taken over by publisher A. Rössing, who then published the second book of Couperus, Orchids, a collection of prose and poetry. After Rössing filed for bankruptcy in 1890 the rights were taken over by L.J. Veen, who would publish the second edition in 1895. In 1989 Veen would reprint Orchids when Couperus' complete works were published.

== Description ==
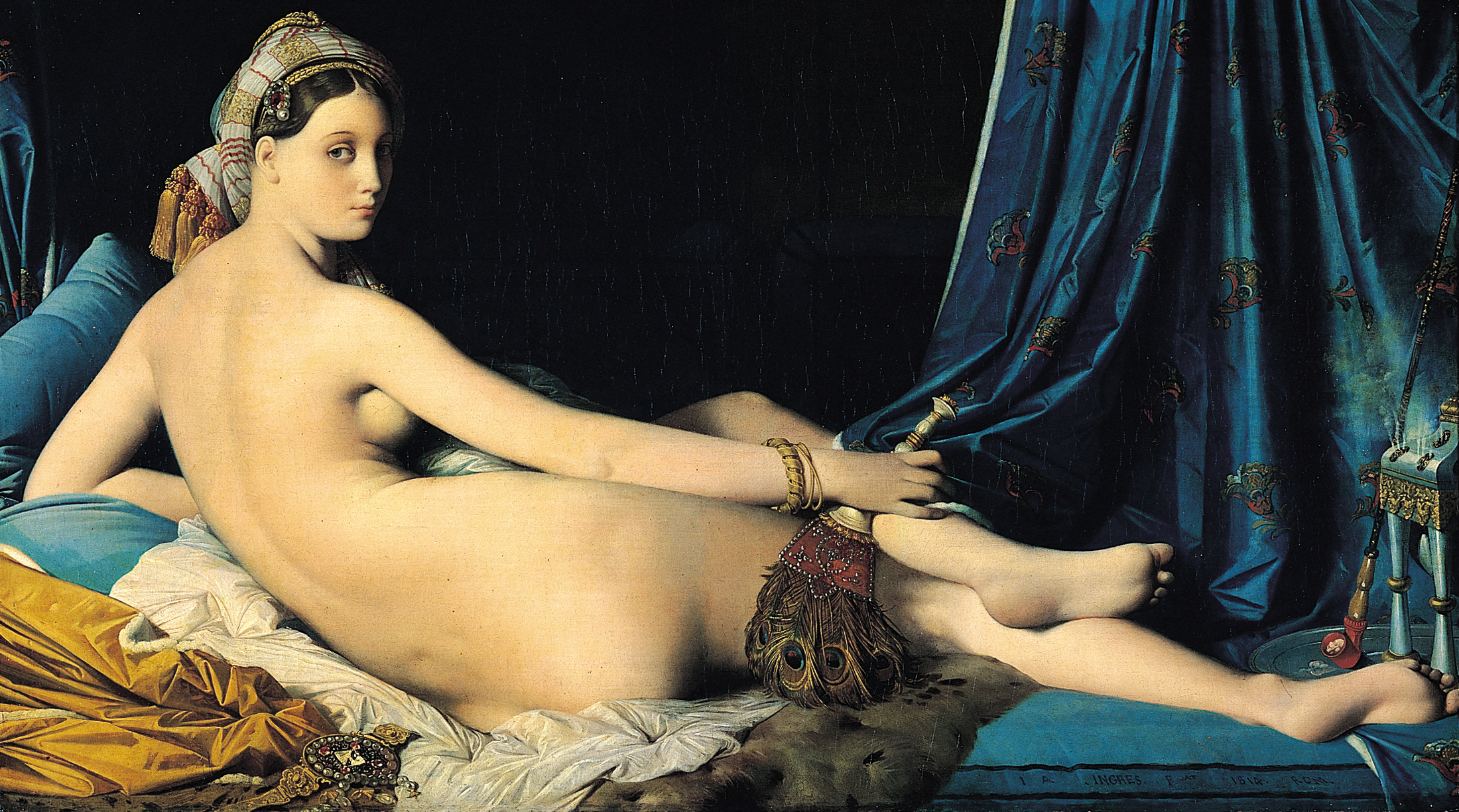
According to Couperus' biographer Bastet Orchids was crowded with odalisques

Couperus wrote the poems that were collected in this book in 1884 and 1885. In July 1886 he wrote to his sister Trudy: During the autumn I intend to reprint my verses and prose under the name of "Orchids". Don't you think that title is quite chic and aristocratic? In Orchids, a collection of prose and poetry Couperus published two of his poems that were inspired by Petrarch. Verses that also were included in Orchids were Eros and Psyche (Eros and Psyche) and Fragment; in Fragment the chimera motive is introduced and the legendary creature is compared to art. Couperus said of the chimera motive: a golden and very bright fantasy. In other poems Couperus described colorful paintings and platonic love. The poems (for example Erinnering (memory), which was Couperus' debut poem in "Het Vaderland" in 1883) were first published in the Dutch magazines "The Gids, "Het Vaderland", de "Nederlandse Spectator" (Dutch Spectator), "The Amsterdammer" and "Nederland". Couperus dedicated the book to his teacher, professor Dr. J. ten Brink and wrote in the preface: as a token of friendship and gratitude to my highly venerated teacher.

The first edition of Orchids appeared in December 1885 but the number of books printed is unknown. For the second edition about 1.500 books were printed; after 1897 Orchids was no longer sold and the second edition was eventually sold out by 1935. in 1919 100 books were printed with a book cover made by Hendrik Petrus Berlage. When the complete works of Louis Couperus were published in fifty volumes during the period 1987-1996 one of the first volumes included Orchids.

== Reviews of Orchids ==
Couperus biographer, Frédéric Bastet, described Couperus' poems as: Bacchantes, odalisques, sirens and eunuchs populate this Parnassiens-poetry, but they remain opera characters without much content. Critics in Couperus' time had different opinions about Couperus' second book. In "Het Nieuws van de Dag" a critic wrote that orchids were expensive and exotic flowers and that Couperus' book was like that; everything was colored, fine and beautiful but not very Dutch. The language style Couperus had used was called licked and elegant and was compared with the elegant men in the best rooms of their houses in the 18th century. One critic wrote, when he was writing a review of Eline Vere in 1891, that he would be very sorry if Couperus, as he claimed, would no longer write poetry, as the critic had read and admired in Couperus' first two books, A ribbon of poems and Orchids. Willem Kloos, who already had written a bad critic about A ribbon of poems found Orchids "absolute trash". Lodewijk van Deyssel, who was very critical when Orchids was first published wrote in 1923 about Orchids: You have probably not precisely known the appreciation by your Amsterdamsche fellow youth, that sympathized with you in your enthusiasm for the Dutch Literature.

In the preface of Williswinde (1895) Couperus wrote: I will most probably never write anything more what one might call poetry. But the poetry I have written - however one may judge- was written with a naive love that is still in me. In the summer of 1894 Couperus and his wife, Elisabeth Couperus-Baud, moved to a new address, the Jacob van der Doesstreet 123 in The Hague; here he received the second print of Orchids from his publisher, L.J. Veen. This second print had a book cover made by Ludwig Willem Reymert Wenckebach. Despite the good reviews: what some people remembered were the bad ones; in 1963 the Limburgse Dagblad wrote: Couperus wrote al lot of pathetic verses (A ribbon of poems and Orchids) that are written in vain and swollen language and cause not the slightest effect.

== Gallery ==
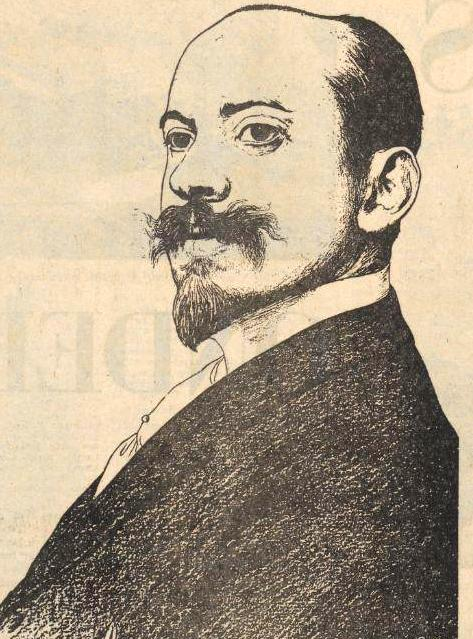
Louis Couperus was the author of Orchids

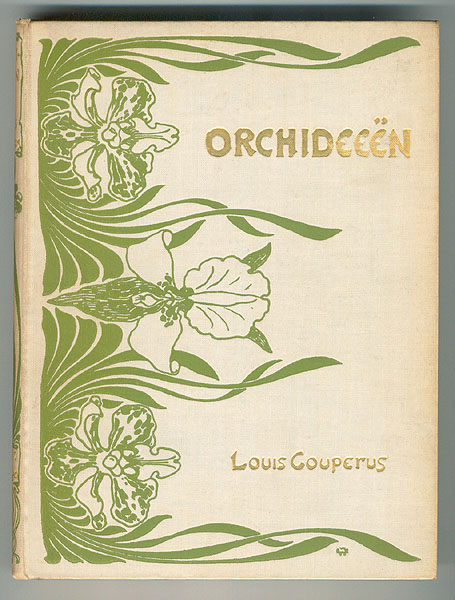
Book cover made by Ludwig Willem Reymert Wenckebach

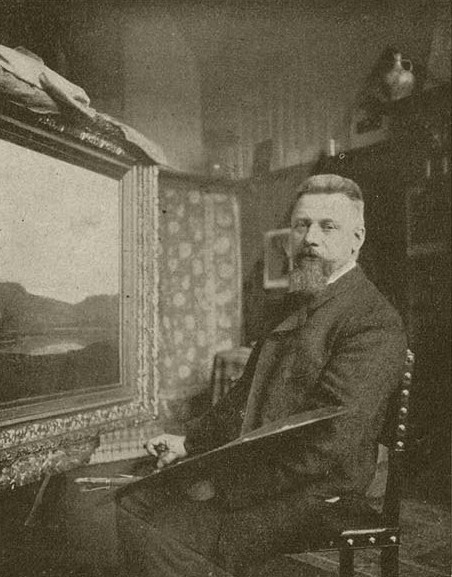
Ludwig Willem Reymert Wenckebach made the book cover of the second print of Orchids
