= The Hague Center =

Coordinates: 52°04′14″N 4°18′46″E

Centrum
- District of The Hague
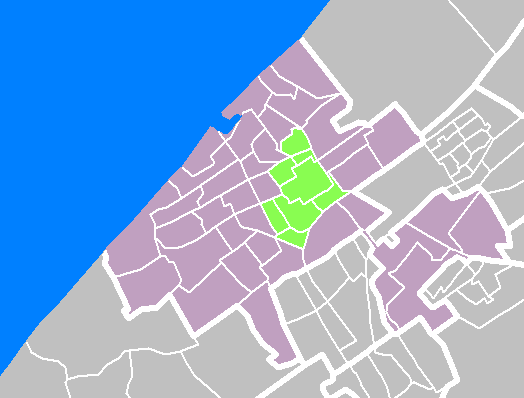
- Location in The Hague
- Country: Netherlands
- Province: South Holland
- Municipality: The Hague

Government
  - Alderman: Bert van Alphen (GL)

Area
  - Total: 779.3 ha (1,926 acres)
  - Land: 762.0 ha (1,883 acres)

Population (1 January 2026)
  - Total: 110,237
  - Density: 14,470/km^{2} (37,470/sq mi)
- Time zone: UTC+1 (CET)
  - Summer (DST): UTC+2 (CEST)

The City Center of The Hague (Dutch: Centrum) is the oldest and, with a population of 110,237 inhabitants (as of 1 January 2026), the second largest of The Hague's eight districts, consisting of nine neighbourhoods. Two railways stations can be found in the city center: Den Haag Centraal and Den Haag Hollands Spoor.

== Subdistricts ==
The district Centrum of The Hague is divided in the following subdistricts (Dutch:wijken):

- Archipelbuurt
- Centrum
- Groente- en Fruitmarkt
- Schildersbuurt
- Stationsbuurt
- Transvaalkwartier
- Willemspark
- Zeeheldenkwartier

== Archipelbuurt ==
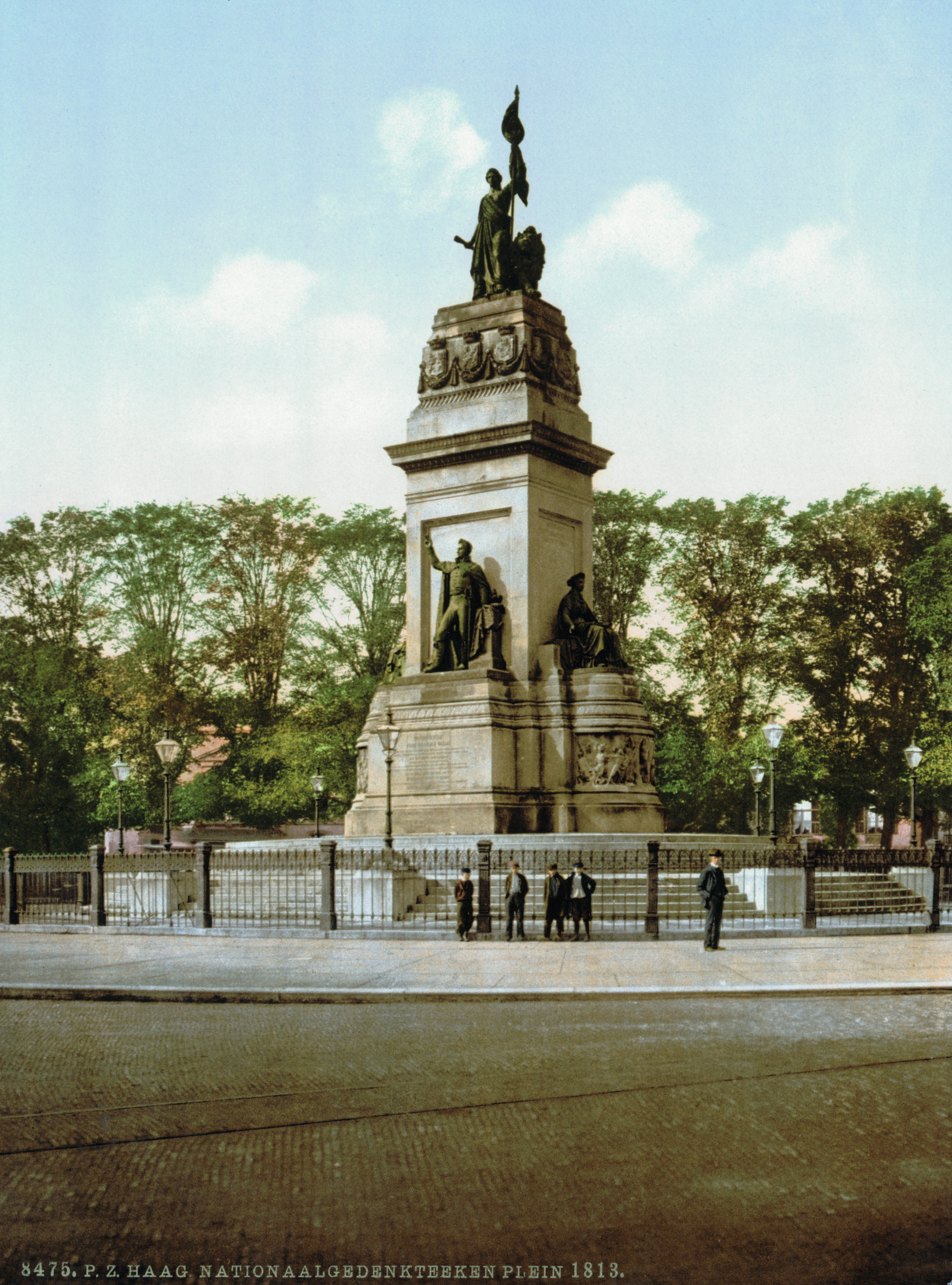
Plein 1813 (Square 1813) with a monument commemorating the founding of the Kingdom of the Netherlands, as seen on a photochrom from ca. 1900.

The neighbourhood Archipelbuurt / Willemspark was largely built at the end of the 19th century. On the south-west border is a Jewish cemetery that dates back to 1694. Later on both the non-denominational and Roman Catholic cemeteries were also situated in this location. The neighbourhood has many wide avenues and streets with large houses, although housing in the smaller streets is more modest. There are even so-called 'hofjeswoningen', an early form of socialised housing. A lot of the large houses nowadays are used as offices, for example at the Nassauplein, the Koninginnegracht and the Laan Copes van Cattenburch. On the southern border of the Archipelbuurt there are newly built offices, the police headquarters and the Nationale Investeringsbank (National Investment Bank).

== Oude Centrum ==
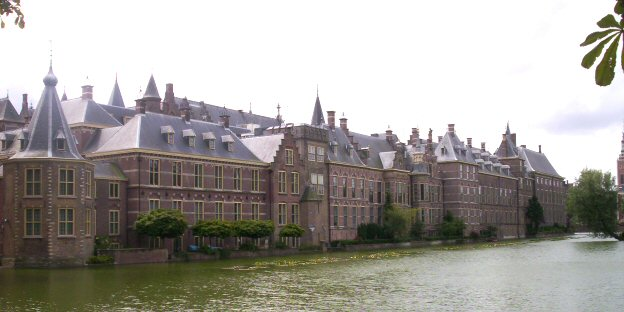
The medieval Binnenhof, meeting place of the Dutch houses of parliament, the city of The Hague originated.

The Oude Centrum (Old Center) forms the heart of The Hague, which includes the Binnenhof and Hofvijver, the Noordeinde Palace, the Mauritshuis museum, and the City Hall of The Hague. The history of the old center is reflected in the architectural diversity that can be found in this part of the city center, ranging from 17th century Renaissance to 20th century expressionism.

== Schilderswijk ==
The Schilderswijk is one of the poorest neighbourhoods of the Netherlands. Unemployment is significant, and many people are dependent on governmental support. In 2006 (the latest available figures), 70% of the inhabitants of the Schilderswijk had a low income, 25% a middle income, and 5% a high income. In 3450 residents in 2007 undertook paid employment or self, the magnitude of the potential workforce (the number of people aged 15–64) was in 2008 22,253. Of all households in the district lived in Schilderswijk in 2007 42% of the poverty line from 16% in The Hague.

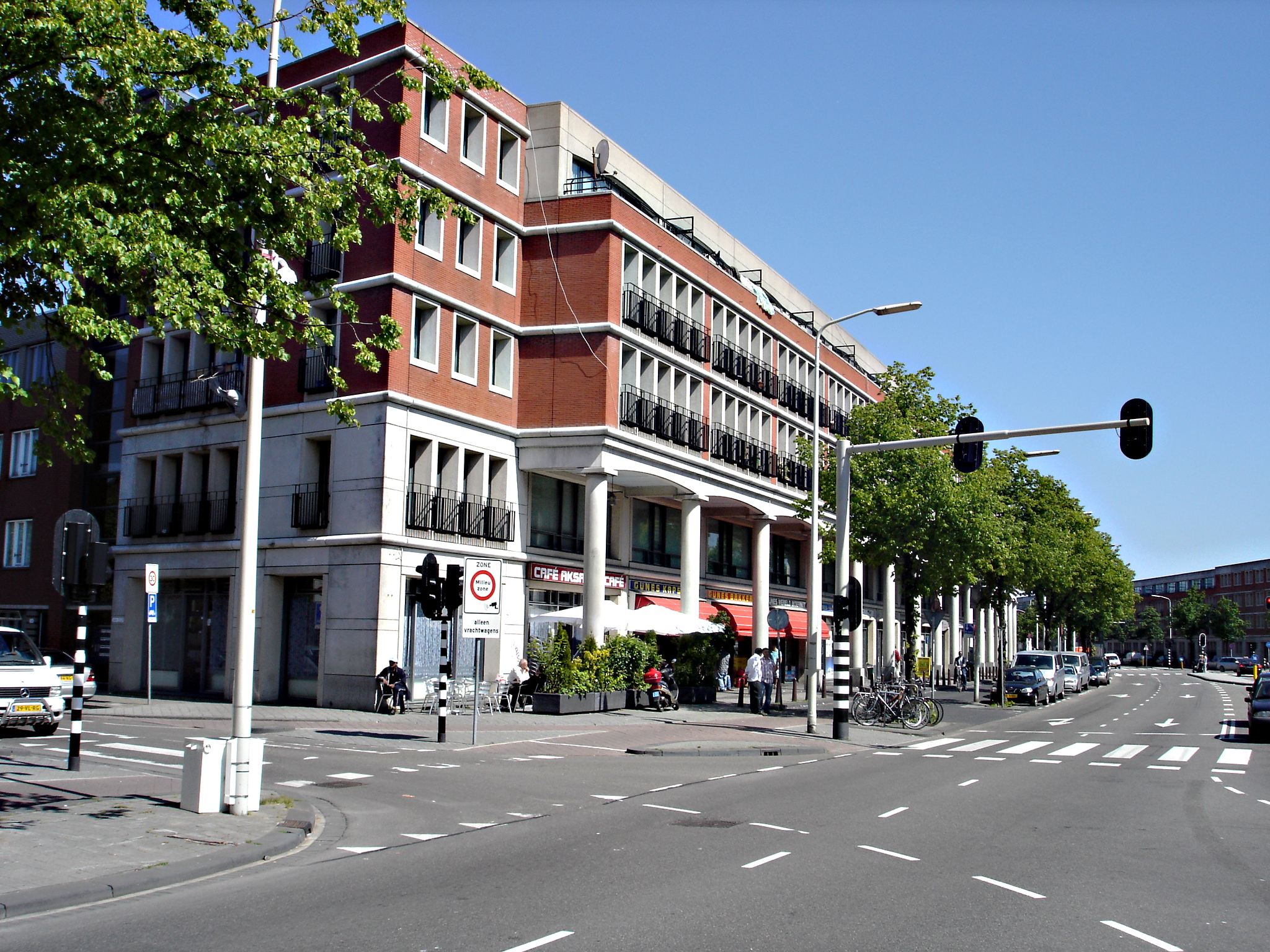
Vaillantlaan: social housing project by architect Jo Coenen

More than 90% of the registered residents are of non-Western origin - notably Turkish, Moroccan and Surinamese. Of the housing stock approximately 25% is privately owned, these homes are often rented. The remaining houses are owned by the housing association HaagWonen. Especially in the eastern part of the Schilderswijk (Orange Square and around the station Holland Spoor) some problems have been addressed, so the renewed Orange Square, have built larger homes including houses for sale, for example the new Mirador project, and the prostitution in the Dijksestraat were removed. This street is changed in the Wolterbeek Street.

The migration changed the district not only physically but also socially. The investment by the government to solve the problems of urban renewal in the district not, the unemployment remained high, the neighborhood quickly deteriorated again, crime increased and there was nuisance of drug addicts, vandalism and graffiti. The response from the community was a social community development, welfare and housing associations which were deployed. The approach consisted mainly of amenity programs. Thus, many such residents to activities funded social cohesion in the area to strengthen. Also, many small changes made to the social security and increase the pollution abatement, such as better lighting and more garbage.

== Stationsbuurt ==
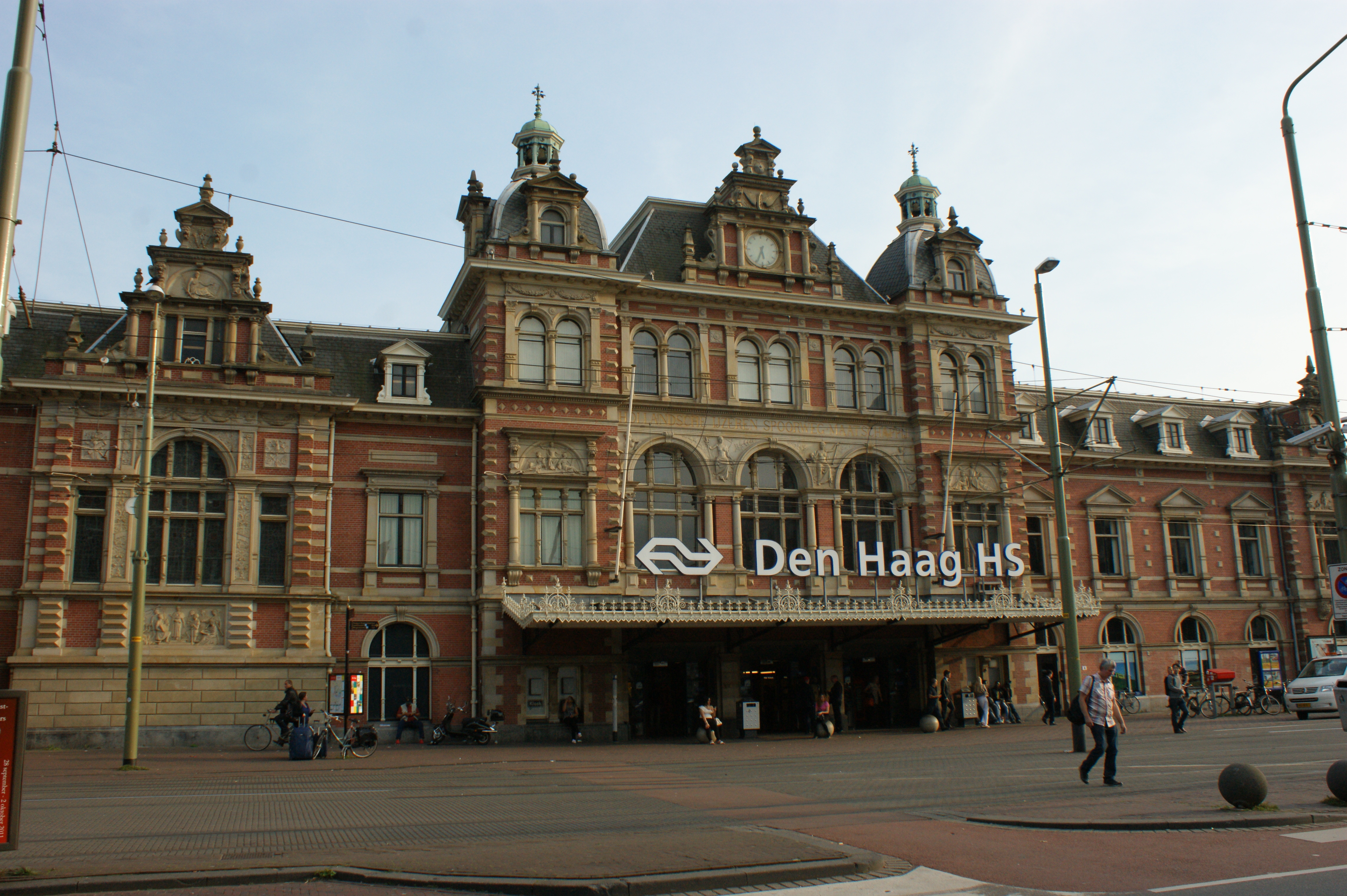
Hollands Spoor Station, built in 1891-1893

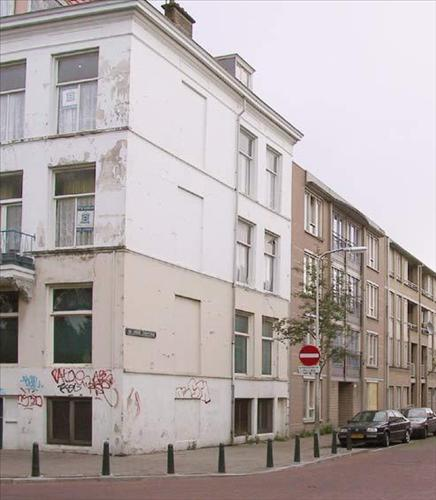
The impoverished Oranjeplein in the Stationsbuurt, before its renovation.

Many original buildings from the late 19th and early 20th century were demolished and replaced by new buildings in the 1970s and 1980s in the context of an urban renewal that started around 1975. The area between Station and Hollands Spoor Rijswijkseplein, for instance, had been completely renovated. From 2000 on, the district was renovated, this time with more respect for the historic value of buildings. Besides the demolition and replacement of old houses, a lot of houses were renovated instead, an example being the Orange Square, in 2003. Despite all the innovation, a few monumental buildings can be found in the Stationsbuurt, such as the houses of the Huygens Park, Groenewegje, Bierkade, Dunne Bierkade and Oranjeplein, and some monumental houses can still be found at the Stationsweg. At the Van Hogendorpstraat, a "labourer's courtyard" can still be found. Many companies are located in the Stationsbuurt, in particular due to the proximity of public transport. In 1981 a plan was adopted by the municipality that would make sure that the residential function of the neighbourhood would be retained.

== Kortenbos ==
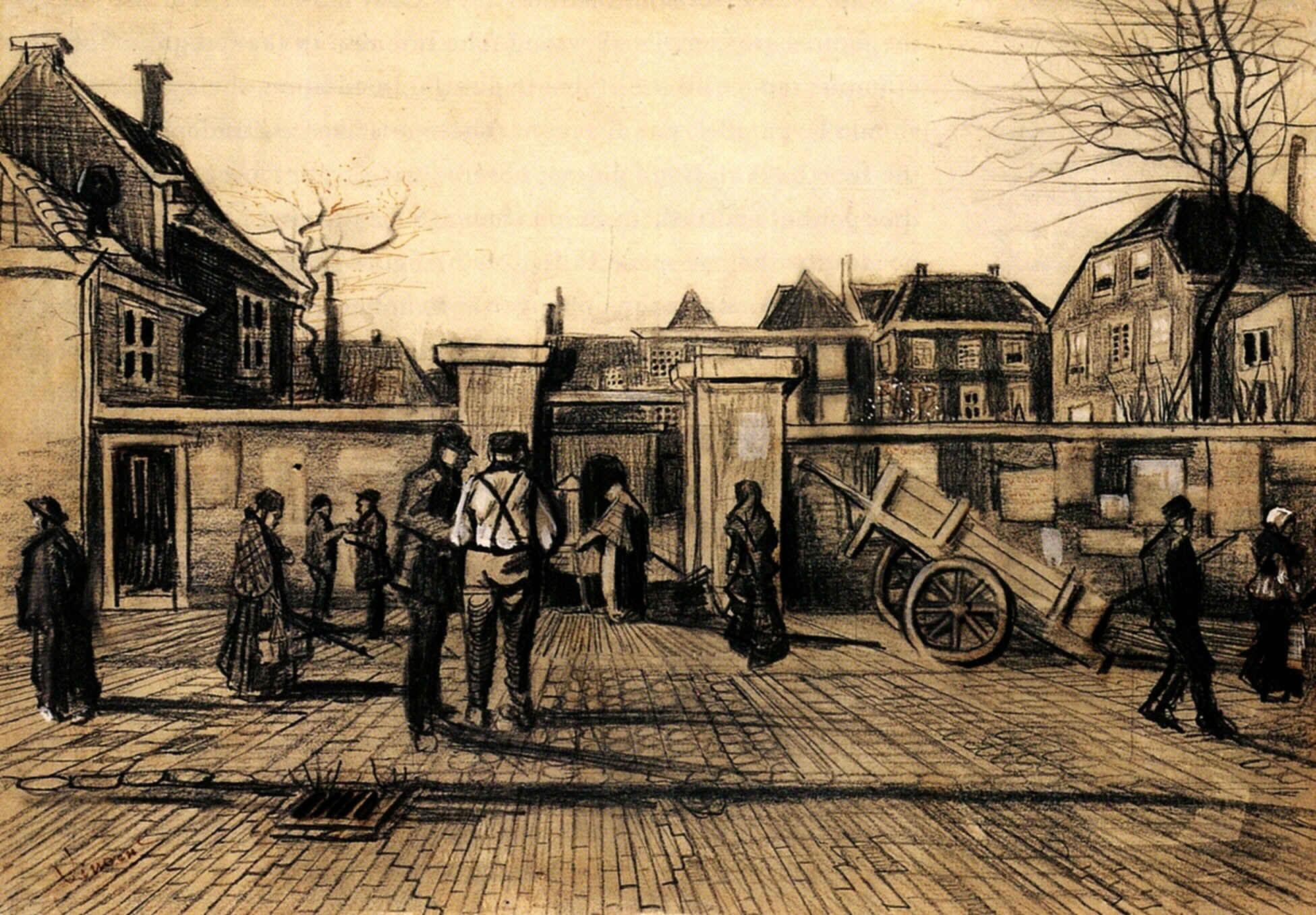
Kortenbos: The (back-) entrance of the City Bank of Loans at the Korte Lombardstraat (Vincent van Gogh, 1882)

The Kortenbos neighbourhood is amongst of the oldest of The Hague, and dates back to the Middle Ages. Most inhabitants of The Hague define Kortenbos as the area between the Jan Hendrikstraat/Torenstraat, Noordwal, Lijnbaan and Prinsegracht. This is the area where the neighborhood association is active. However, the area north of the Torenstraat/Jan Hendirkstraat is also part of the neighbourhood. This is the Hofkwartier district, located around the Molenstraat, Oude Molstraat and Noordeinde.

Kortenbos' main function is living. In earlier days there were a lot of small companies and some larger companies, for example the Zuid Hollandse Bierbrouwerijen (South Holland Brewery) located on the Noordwal. Typically its population used to consist of some of the poorer inhabitants of the city. Only in the area of the Westeinde (West End Street) to the Prinsegracht (Prince Canal) you would find more exclusive residences. The neighbourhood was partly reorganised in the early 1930s, with a second, more intense reorganisation in the 1970s. A lot of old houses and industrial buildings were demolished and replaced with new buildings, mainly socialised housing. The two 'hofjes' in Kortenbos were tidied up; the monumental 'Hofje van Nieuwkoop' and the 'Hofje van Vredebest'. The renovation was officially finished in 1991, although a new project was started immediately after, involving housing on the former location of the bathhouse on the Torenstraat.

As a neighbourhood where a lot of working-class people lived, it was a logical choice for the 1872 Hague Congress, also called the fifth congress of the International Workingmen's Association (IWA), held from 2–7 September. A decisive conflict took place at the meeting in a café annex conference room called "Excelsior" in the korte Lombardstraat, between the champions of the political struggle of the proletariat Karl Marx and Mikhail Bakunin, where Bakunin was to be expelled from the movement. Also a number of incidents would take place between supporters of the IWA on the one hand and anarchists on the other. Perhaps most dramatic was an accident, when on account of too many supporters being cramped up on a balcony of the meeting hall, it collapsed, and a number of people where severely hurt.

== Transvaal ==
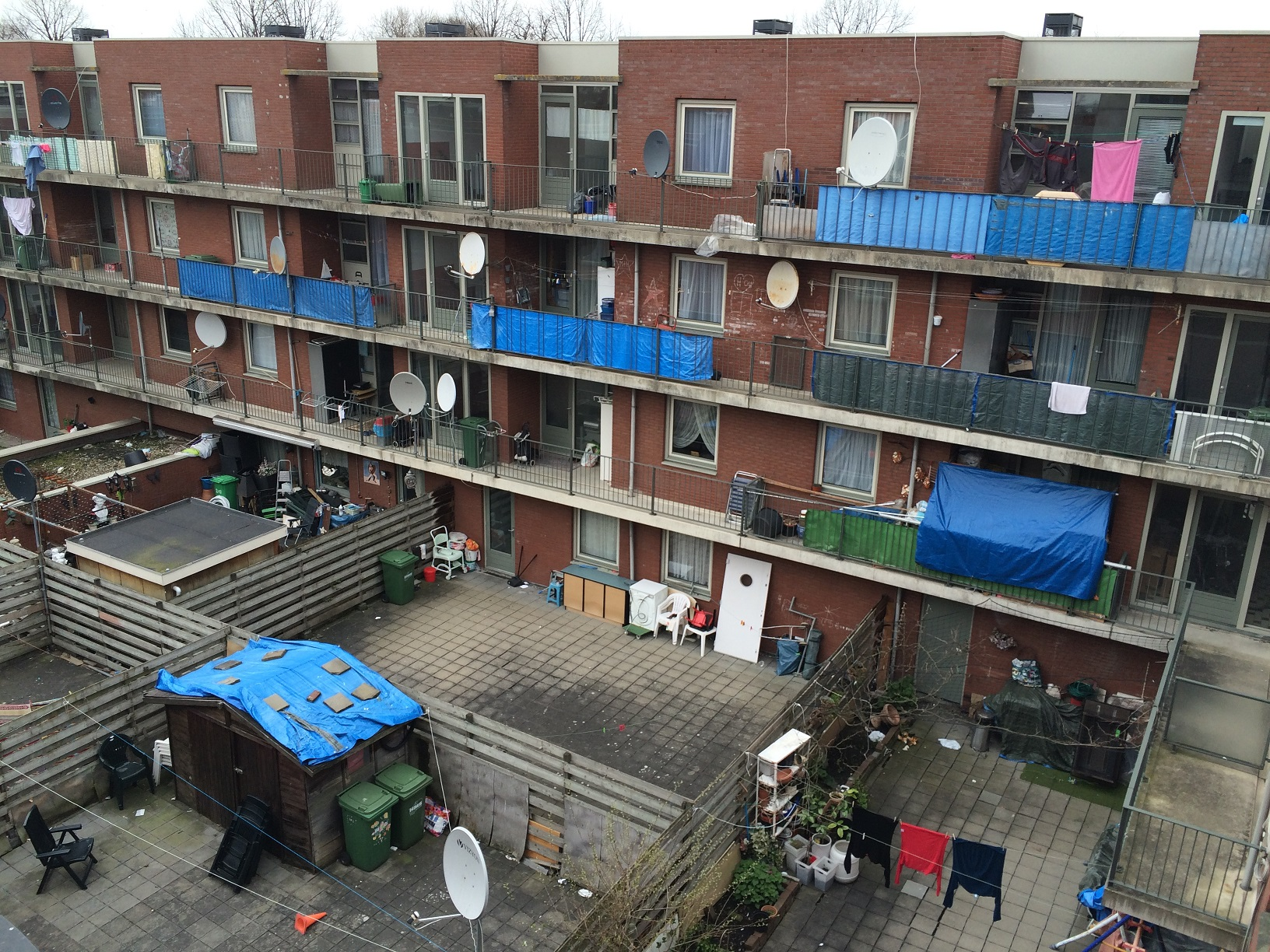
Transvaal: Rear side of public housing at 's-Gravenzandelaan (2015)

Transvaal is a multi-ethnic area with 15,472 inhabitants as of 1 January 2013. Starting in the 1990s, many poor houses were demolished to make room for new buildings. This significantly changed the character of the neighbourhood. Transvaal changed from a popular to a multicultural neighbourhood. As of 2013, immigrants make up over 90% of the neighbourhood's population, primarily Moroccan, Turkish, and Surinamese people.

2012	Numbers	%
Total population	15,472	100.0
Dutch natives	1,254	8.1
Western immigrants	2,120	13.7
Non-Western immigrants	12,098	78.1
Suriname	3,500	22.6
Morocco	1,910	12.3
Turkey	4,470	28.9
Antilles	312	2.0
Others	1,906	12.3

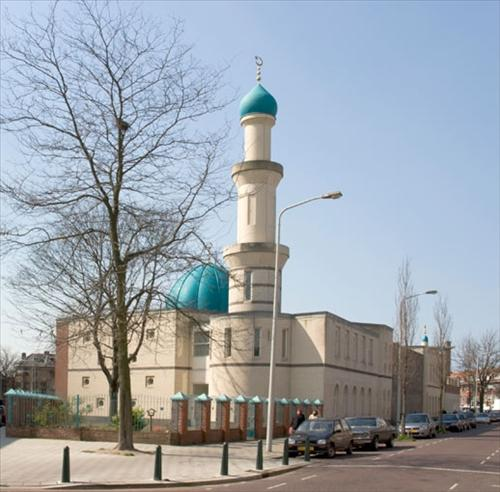
Transvaal: Mosque at Bloemfonteinstraat (2006)

Transvaal is not a wealthy neighborhood; recent figures show that 71% of households have a low income, 24.5% have a middle income, and 4.5% a high income. 32.8% of residents of Transvaal lives of a minimum income, which is twice as high as the city's average. The potential labour force (the population aged 15–64) is 10,875 as of January 2013, but only 2,998 these people in the district earn income or are self-employed. The neighbourhood has about 5,887 homes, owned by the Hague Staedion corporation (50%), Haag Housing (13%), and individuals (37%). The housing is uniform in the Transvaal; there is little variation. Transvaal is one of the most densely populated districts of The Hague. Squares, parks and public green spaces are scarce. The district has high mobility, with 30% of residents moving each year, most of them leaving the Transvaal area. This has a negative impact on social cohesion in the neighbourhood.

Since the 1990s the district has become a local focus area, beginning with demolishing buildings and refurbishing streets. In the beginning there was not much consistency in the plans but a study on housing and living situations in the Transvaal began in 1998 in order to create a coherent plan. Since 2002 a major restructuring has been underway, to be finished in 2015. In that period will be demolished housing corporation 2400, 1250 before coming back which houses 70% 30% sale and rent. Transvaal was always a uniform area with a lot of porch homes, in the future should be more varied housing. A limited number of buildings being renovated, including the former Bathhouse and Juliana Church. There are more demolished than built back, hence the district - who crowded - what with more spacious squares, parks and gardens. An example of recreational space was opened in 2005 at the KempStreet Wijkpark. Moreover, adjacent to the western Transvaal to the Zuiderpark.

In 2007, Transvaal was appointed as one of forty priority neighbourhoods by the Dutch government. Under this program, an action plan was written for the area, describing how residents, community, welfare and corporations want the district to look in ten years. The district is a district with a strong social cohesion, a versatile and provisioning a thriving multicultural shopping wijkeconomie which the heart is, says the plan. In 2007, two projects started to the degradation in the district to counter: Transart Hotel and Transvaal. Both were nominated in 2007 for the New City Price. The prize was won by Transvaal Hotel, this project received €5000,-.

In March 2008, the municipality would promote the shopping street, the Paul Kruger Avenue, an exclusive shopping is Hindu. This is in line with the shops in this street.

== Uilebomen ==
It was at the home at Fluwelen Burgwal 18 in April 1782 that John Adams established the first US embassy and first diplomatic mission in the Netherlands. The home Adams' acquired as the diplomatic mission is gone and replaced by a high rise residential complex.

== Voorhout ==
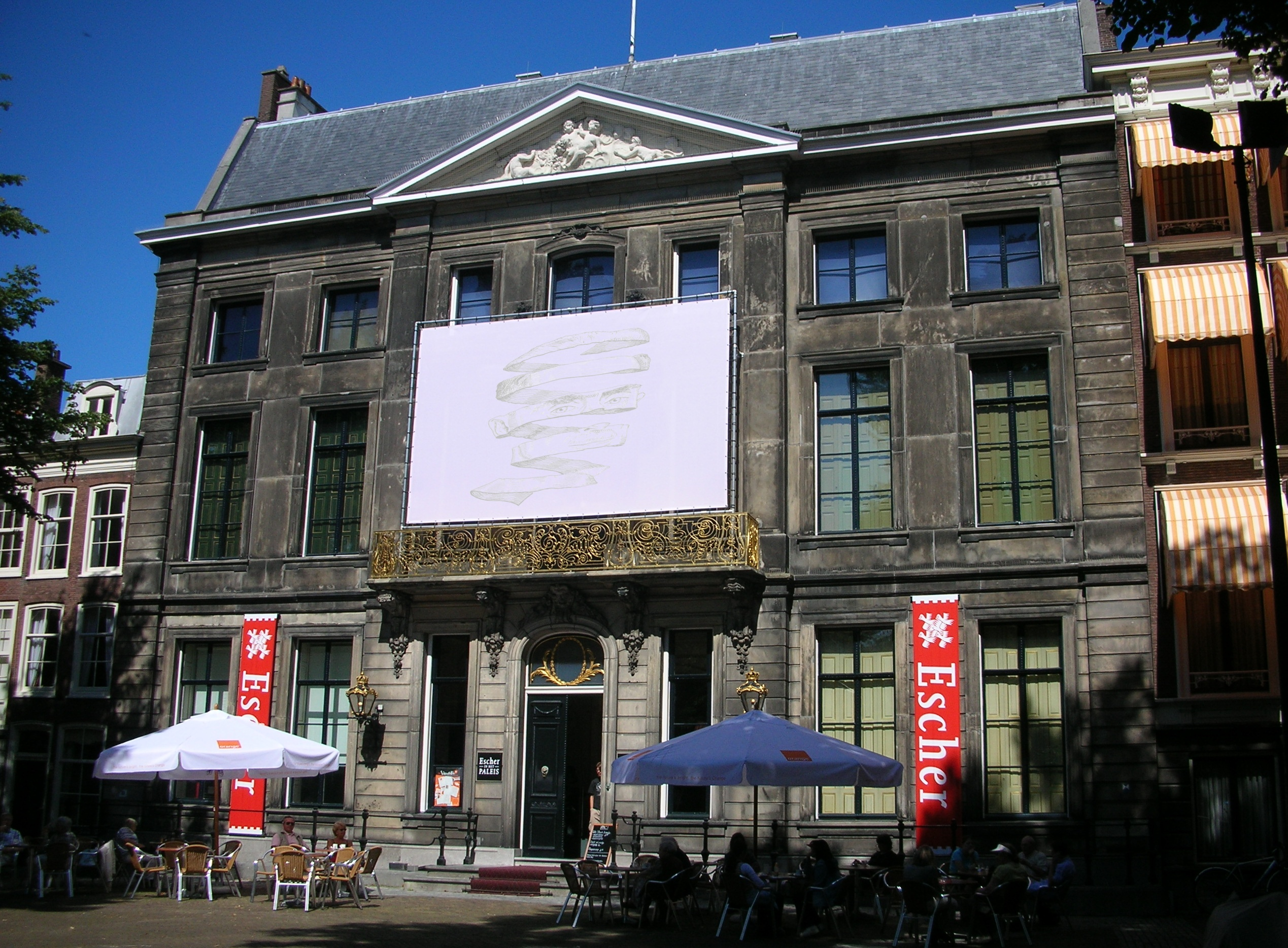
Escher Museum at Lange Voorhout (2005)

== Zeeheldenkwartier ==
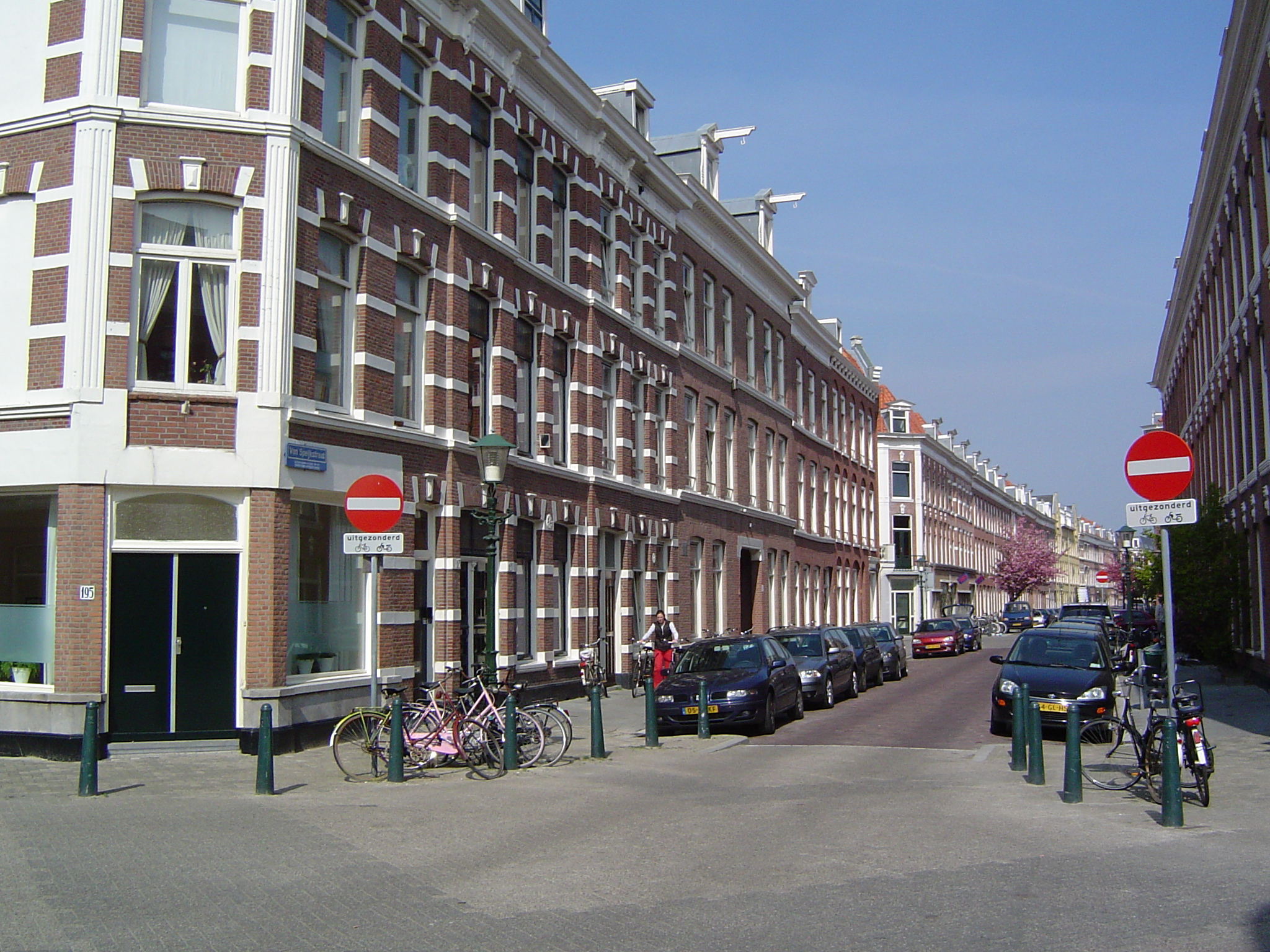
Zeeheldenkwartier: Van Speijkstraat (2004)

The Zeeheldenkwartier is the neighbourhood west of the old center, further divided into the Zeeheldenbuurt, where many wealthy officials live, and the Dichtersbuurt closer to the old center, with predominantly smaller houses than in the Zeeheldenbuurt. Much of the neighbourhood was built in the 19th century, when the area within the canal ring of The Hague didn't have the capacity to meet the significant urbanisation caused by the Industrial Revolution.

== See also ==
- Districts of The Hague
- Nobelhuis
