= Zeeheldenkwartier =

Coordinates: 52.0823°N 4.2967°E

- Neighbourhood of The Hague
- Location of Zeeheldenkwartier in The Hague
- Country: Netherlands
- Province: South Holland
- Municipality: The Hague
- District: Centrum

Area
  - Total: 81.3 ha (201 acres)
  - Land: 81.0 ha (200 acres)

Population (2025)
  - Total: 12,940

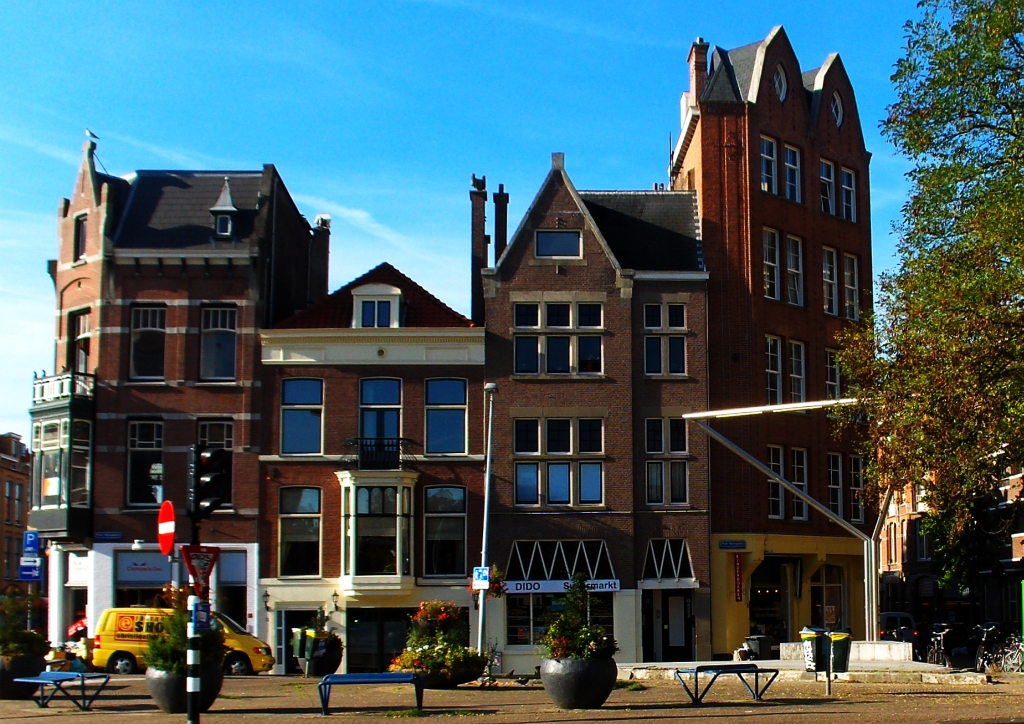
The Piet Heinplein square.

The Zeeheldenkwartier (Dutch pronunciation: [ˈzeːɦɛldə(ŋ)kʋɑrˌtiːr], literally Sea Heroes Quarter) is a neighbourhood in the Centrum district of The Hague, Netherlands. It has 11,205 inhabitants (as of 1 January 2013) and covers an area of 81.3 hectares (0.314 sq mi). It is bordered by the Carnegielaan, the Zeestraat, the Hoge Wal and the Prinsessewal to the north-east, the Veenkade to the south, the Waldeck Pyrmontkade to the south-west and the Laan van Meerdervoort to the Carnegielaan to the north. Built between 1870 and 1890, the style of the buildings differs between larger houses for important officials near the Willemspark and the Laan van Meerdervoort, and predominantly smaller houses nearer to the city centre. It has also the most Coffeeshops in town. And it has from Albert Heijn the biggest supermarket in town called “Albert Heijn XL”.
