= Caroline de Westenholz =

Dutch art historian

Caroline Anne Freiin de Westenholz (London, 1954) is an Anglo-Dutch art historian and writer. She is the founder of the Louis Couperus Museum in The Hague.

== Early life and education ==
Caroline de Westenholz was born in London in 1954. She is the daughter of Albert Friedrich Paul Freiherr von Westenholz (1921-2011) and Elisabeth Henriette van Hasselt (1927-2014). In 1960, her mother remarried Albert Vogel jr. (1924-1982), a Dutch solo-actor who recited literature on stage the world over. He became famous with his literary one man show about Louis Couperus. In 1973, he published a biography of this author. Caroline's mother was Vogel's fourth wife. Albert Vogel also owned an avant garde art gallery, Orez International Gallery (from 1971 called Ornis), which was located at 17, Javastraat, The Hague.

De Westenholz studied history of art at the University of Leiden and received her doctorate on a dissertation about her "step grandfather" Albert Vogel sr. (1874-1933), who also was a famous solo actor in the Netherlands.

== Career ==
In 1985, De Westenholz moved back to London to become the first European employee of MTV Europe. Later, she co-organized a number of exhibitions about Dutch art in England, one of which took place during the William and Mary celebration year. As off 1992, she continued to work as a free-lance art historian en writer in Monaco but returned to London a few years later.

In 1996, De Westenholz became known to the public when she founded the Louis Couperus Museum. It was established in what used to be her stepfather's art gallery. Ever since, the museum has organized fifty-three exhibitions about work and life of the author. As off 1995, she was the chair of the museum foundation. Unfortunately, in May 2024, the museum had to close because of a complete lack of support from the local authorities.

In 1988 she married Peter Nathaniel de Bruce ffrench-Hodges (1935-2017), who during his working life was Head of Overseas Press with the British Tourist Authority (now Visit Britain) and a cookery book author. She lives in London and the Hague.

== Awards and honours ==
On 18 June 2013 she received a Zilveren Anjer (Silver Carnation, the equivalent of a British Companion of Honour) from former Queen Beatrix of the Netherlands for the founding and upkeep of the Louis Couperus Museum. The next year, the Council of the city of The Hague awarded her the Victorine Hefting prize, an award for women who have contributed to the culture of this town. In 2022 she received a knighthood. She was awarded the grade of Knight in the Order of Oranje-Nassau.

== Selection of works ==
- (in Dutch) Albert Vogel. Voordrachtskunstenaar en mecenas (1924-1982). Amsterdam (November) 2024
- (in Dutch) Louis Couperus. De verwende vagebond. De geïllustreerde biografie. Amsterdam (June) 2023
- (in English) I Will Do Anything for England... The Life of Peter ffrench-Hodges. London (March) 2022
- (in English) From Castles to Casinos. The Von Westenholz Family. Amsterdam, (November) 2017
- (in Dutch)*(in English) Hoger die drempel! Een geschiedenis van Internationale Galerij Orez. Higher that Level! A History of Orez International Gallery. Amsterdam, 2016
- (in Dutch) De familie von Westenholz. Van kastelen tot casino's. Amsterdam, (November) 2015
- (in Dutch) De Vogels. Een flamboyante theaterfamilie. Amsterdam, 2014
- (in Dutch) Een witte stad van weelde. Louis Couperus en Nice (1900-1910). Den Haag, 1996
- (in Dutch) John Sillevis en Caroline de Westenholz, Louis Couperus Museum 1996-2001. Een uitgave van het Louis Couperus Museum ter gelegenheid van het vijfjarig bestaan op 10 juni 2001. Den Haag, 2001
- (in Dutch) Albert Vogel, voordrachtskunstenaar (1874-1933). Een onderzoek naar retorica en voordrachtskunst in het eerste kwart van de twintigste eeuw. [S.l.], 2002 (dissertation)
- (in English) Caroline de Westenholz, 'Beardsley at Menton'. in: The Death of Pierrot. A Beardsley Miscellany, ed. by Steven Halliwell and Matthew Sturgis, London 1998, pp. 9–16
- (in English) Caroline de Westenholz, 'Flying Dutchman. Why Louis Couperus is Neglected in his own Country' in: The Times Literary Supplement, nr. 4948, 30 Jan. 1998
