= Archipelbuurt =

- Neighbourhood
- Location of Archipelbuurt in The Hague
- Country: Netherlands
- Province: South Holland
- Municipality: The Hague
- District: Centrum

Area
  - Total: 87.1 ha (215 acres)
  - Land: 86.1 ha (213 acres)

Population (2025)
  - Total: 6,264

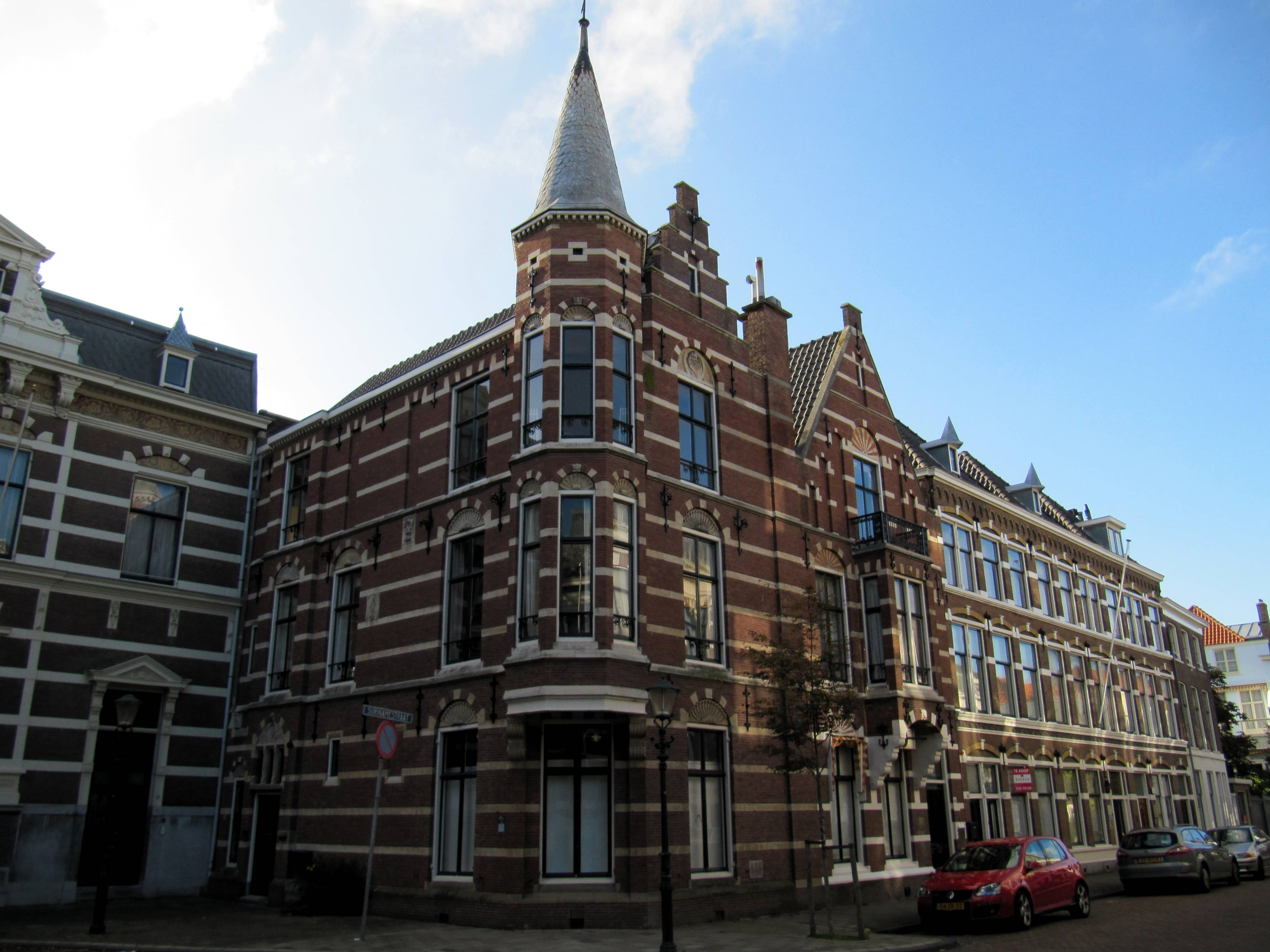
Neo-Renaissance architecture in the Archipelbuurt.

The Archipelbuurt (Dutch pronunciation: [ˈɑrxipɛlˌbyːrt]; lit. 'Archipelago Neighbourhood') is a neighbourhood in the Centrum district of The Hague, Netherlands. It has 5,764 inhabitants (as of 1 January 2013) and covers an area of 87.1 hectares (0.336 sq mi). Built primarily between 1860 and 1890, the neighbourhood is known for its Neo-Renaissance architecture and wide avenues and streets. Important streets in the Archipelbuurt include the Javastraat, the Surinamestraat, the Scheveningseweg, the Nassauplein and the Burgemeester De Monchyplein. A Jewish graveyard, a chapel and a former city hall of The Hague can be found in the neighbourhood. The Dutch novelist and poet Louis Couperus resided in Javastraat 17. Today, this is the Louis Couperus Museum.
