= Everhardus Johannes Potgieter =

Dutch prose writer and poet (1808–1875)

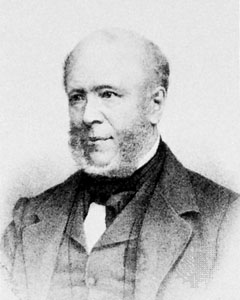
Everhardus Johannes Potgieter

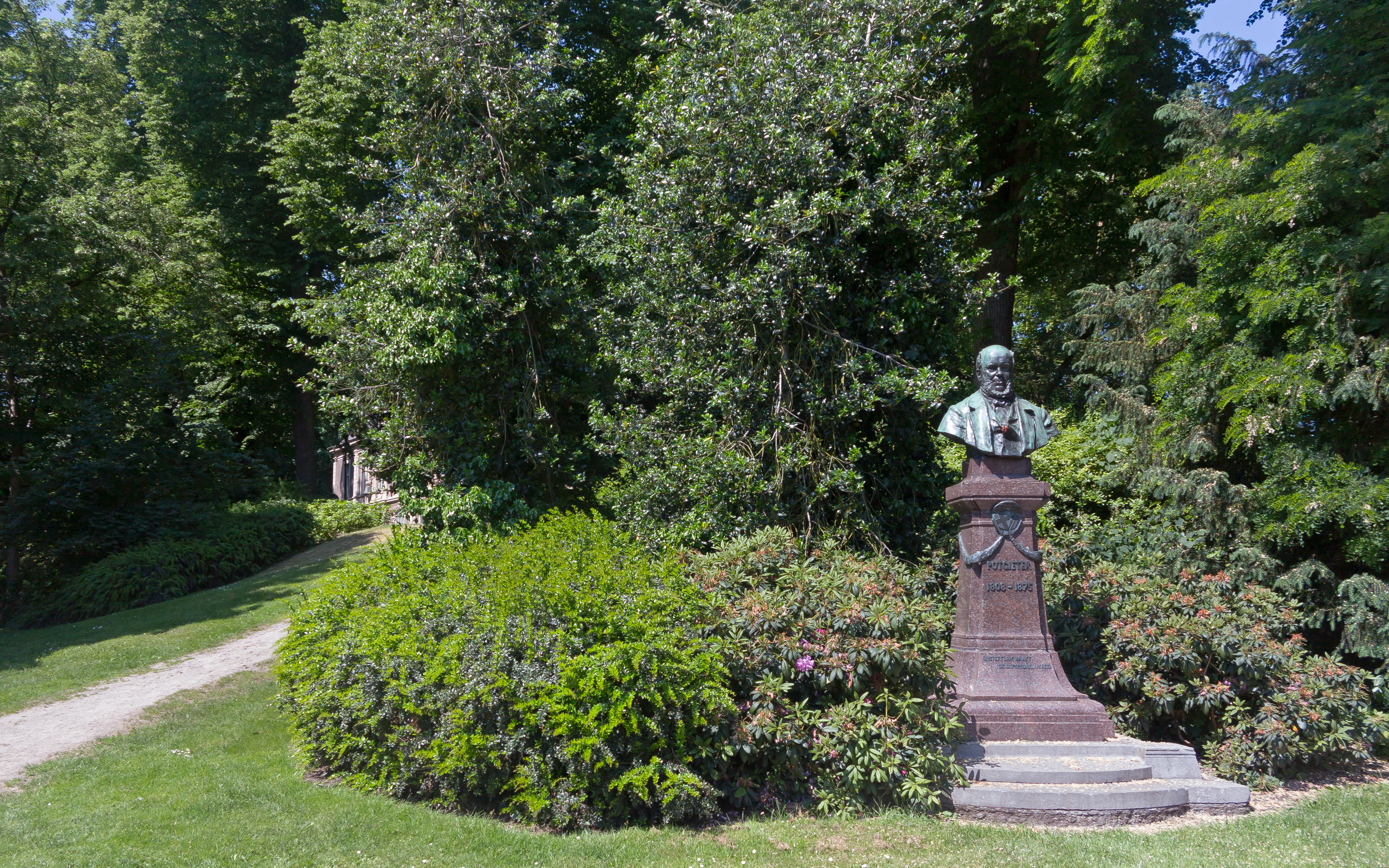
Torso Potgieter in Zwolle

Everhardus Johannes Potgieter (June 27, 1808 – February 3, 1875) was a Dutch prose writer and poet, who was born at Zwolle in Overijssel.

== Biography ==
He started life in a merchant's office at Antwerp. In 1831 he made a journey to Sweden, described in two volumes Het Noorden in omtrekken en tafereelen ("The North in Outlines and Scenes"), which appeared at Amsterdam in 1836–1840. Soon afterwards he settled in Amsterdam, engaged in commercial pursuits on his own account, but with more and more inclination towards literature. With Jan Pieter Heije (1809 – 1876), the popular poet of Holland in those days, and Reinier Cornelis Bakhuizen van den Brink (1810 – 1865), the rising historian (see also Guillaume Groen van Prinsterer (1801 - 1876)), Potgieter founded De Muzen (The Muses, 1834–1836), a literary review, which was, however, soon superseded by De Gids (The Guide), a monthly, which became the leading magazine of Holland. In it he wrote, mostly under the initials of W. Dg, a great number of articles and poems.

The first collected edition of his poems (1832–1868) appeared in two volumes (Haarlem, 1868–1875), preceded by some of his contributions to De Gids, in two volumes also (Haarlem, 1864), and followed by three volumes of his Studien en Schetsen ("Studies and Sketches", Haarlem, 1879). Soon after his death a more comprehensive edition of Potgieter's Verspreide en Nagelaten Werken ("Miscellaneous and Posthumous Works") was published in eight volumes by his friend and literary executor, Johan C. Zimmerman (Haarlem, 1875–1877), who likewise supervised a more complete edition of Potgieter's writings which appeared at Haarlem in 1885-1890 in 19 volumes.

Of Potgieter's Het Noorden in Omtrekken en Tafreelen the third edition was issued in 1882, and an edition de luxe of his poems followed at Haarlem in 1893. Under the title of Personen en Onderwerpen ("Persons and Subjects") many of Potgieter's critical essays had collectively appeared in three volumes at Haarlem in 1885, with an introduction by Conrad Busken-Huet.

Potgieter's favourite master among the Dutch classics was Pieter Cornelissen Hooft, whose peculiarities in style and language he admired and imitated. The same vein of altruistic, if often exaggerated and biased, abhorrence of the conventionalities of literary life runs through all his writings, even through his private correspondence with Huet, parts of which have been published.

Potgieter remained to his death the irreconcilable enemy of the Dutch Jan Salie, as the Dutchman is nicknamed who does not believe in the regeneration of the Dutch people. Potgieter held up the Netherlanders of the Dutch Golden Age of the 16th and 17th centuries as models to be emulated. In these views he essentially differed from Huet. Yet the two friends worked harmoniously together; and when Potgieter reluctantly gave up De Gids in 1865, it was Huet whom he chose as his successor.

Both then proceeded to Italy, and were present at the Dante festivities at Florence, which in Potgieter's case resulted in a poem in twenty stanzas, Florence (Haarlem, 1868). According to a critique in the Encyclopædia Britannica Eleventh Edition, Potgieter's influence in Holland was very marked and beneficial; but his own style, that of ultra-purist, was at times somewhat forced, stilted and not always easily understood.

== Works ==
Handwriting by Potgieter (1837), in a letter to Nicolaas Beets (1814-1903)

- 1836–1840 - Het Noorden in omtrekken en tafereelen
- 1837 - Marten Harpertsz. 1607-1609 (in: De Gids, 1837; published separately by Wereldbibliotheek-vereeniging, 1942, 72 p.)
- 1840 - Liedekens van Bontekoe
- 1841 - Albert
- 1842 - Jan, Jannetje en hun jongste kind
- 1844 - Het Rijksmuseum te Amsterdam
- 1856 - Het uurwerk van 't Metalen Kruis
- 1864–1895 - Proza 1837-1845 (2 delen)
- 1867 - Florence
- 1868 - Poëzy 1832-1868
- 1875 - Gedroomd paardrijden
- 1875 - Poëzy II
- 1875 - Poëzy 1827-1874
- 1875–1876 - Schetsen en verhalen
