= Nobelhuis =

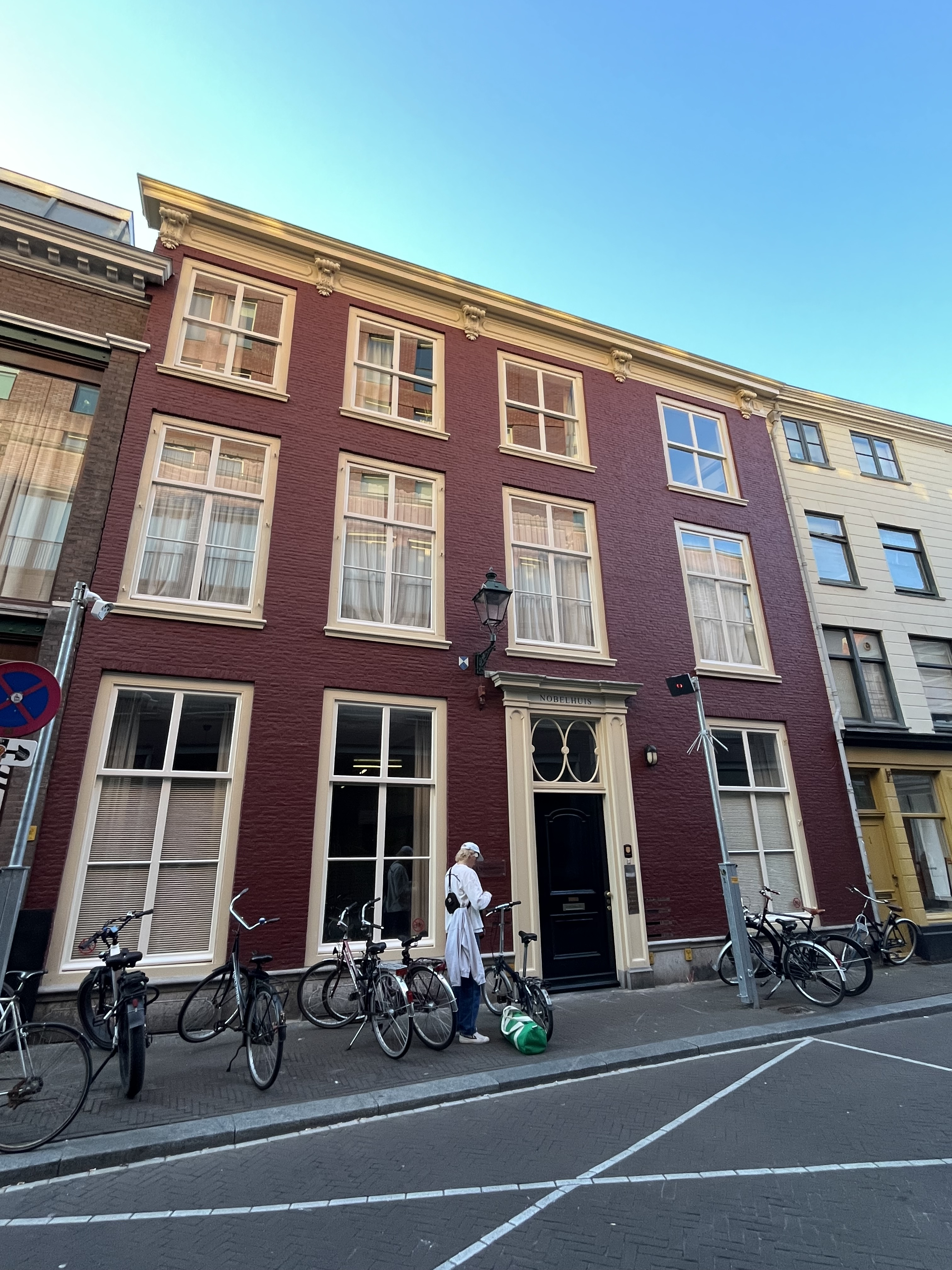
- Interactive map of the Nobelhuis area

General information
- Location: Nobelstraat, The Hague, Netherlands
- Coordinates: 52.079118°N 4.306676°E

The Nobelhuis is a house located in the Nobelstraat in The Hague, the Netherlands. It is believed to be the oldest residential house in The Hague.
