= Willemspark =

Coordinates: 52.0869°N 4.3075°E

- Neighbourhood of The Hague
- Location of Willemspark in The Hague
- Country: Netherlands
- Province: South Holland
- Municipality: The Hague
- District: Centrum

Area
  - Total: 34.6 ha (85 acres)
  - Land: 33.2 ha (82 acres)

Population (2025)
  - Total: 1,731

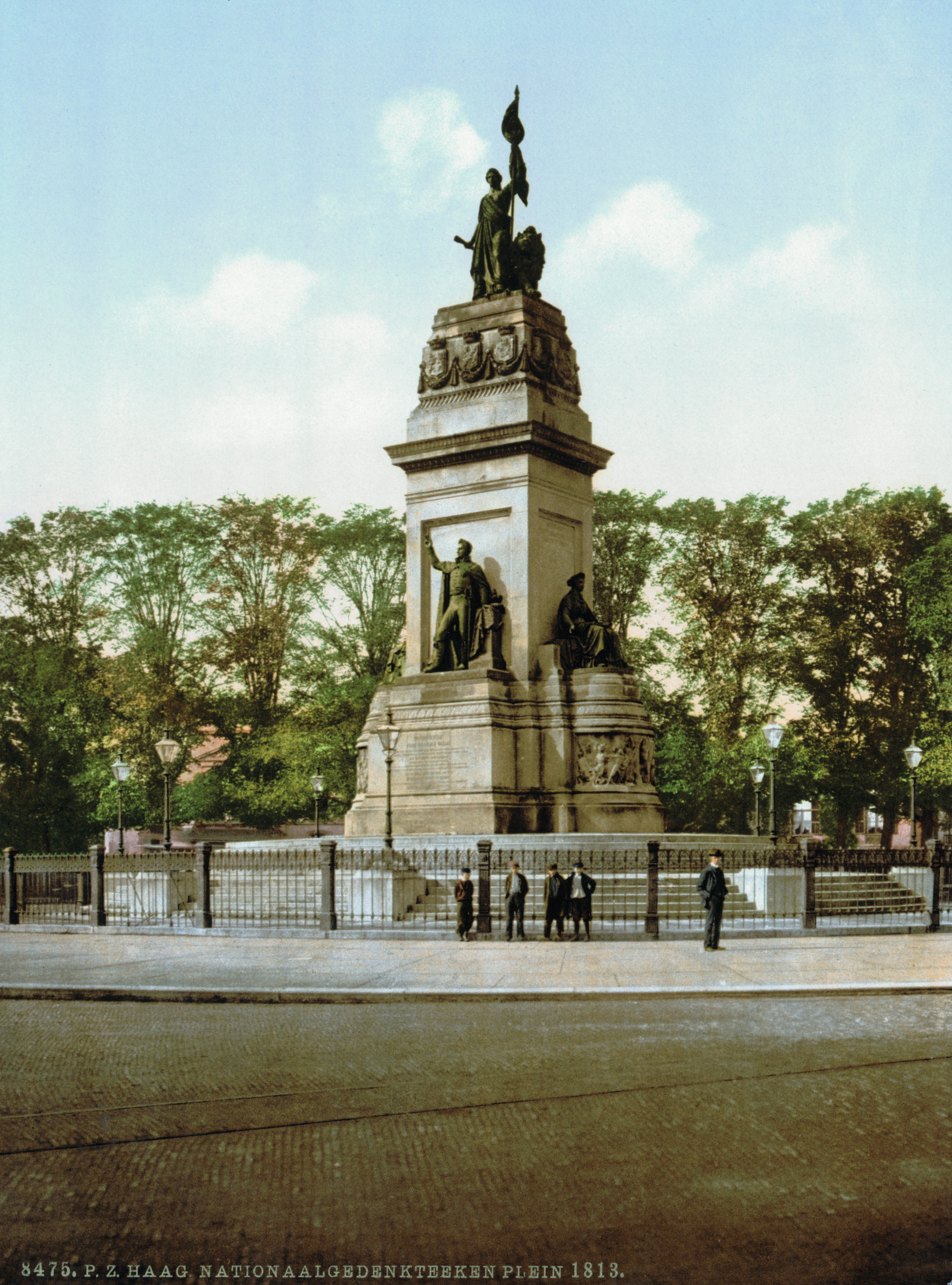
Plein 1813 around 1900.

The Willemspark (Dutch pronunciation: [ˈʋɪləmsˌpɑr(ə)k]; lit. 'William's Park') is a neighbourhood in the Centrum district of The Hague, Netherlands. It has 1,393 inhabitants (as of 1 January 2013) and covers an area of 34.6 hectares (0.134 sq mi). It is bordered by the Zeestraat to the south-east, the Scheveningseveer, the Mauritskade and the Dr. Kuyperstraat to the south-east, the Prinsessegracht to the north-east and the Javastraat to the north-west. The park was originally property of king William II, but he sold the area to the municipality of The Hague in 1855, after which it became a villa park. Iconic to the neighbourhood are the Alexanderstraat and the Sophialaan, two historic streets in Willemspark, that intersect on Plein 1813. This square is marked by a monument commemorating the defeat of Napoleon and the establishment of the Sovereign Principality of the United Netherlands.
