= Albert Vogel =

Albert Vogel sr.
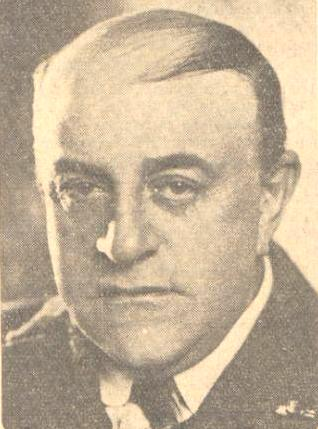
- Albert Vogel Sr.
- Born: Louis Albert Anthing Vogel; 18 June 1874; Bergen op Zoom
- Died: 8 November 1933 (aged 59)
- Occupations: Performer and writer
- Spouse: Ellen Buwalda (m. 1916-1933; his death)
- Children: 3

Albert Vogel (18 June 1874, Bergen op Zoom – 8 November 1933, The Hague) was a Dutch officer, teacher and performer.

== Biography ==
Louis Albert Anthing Vogel was born in Bergen op Zoom and attended the H.B.S. in Haarlem and Leiden. He was trained at a military school in Kampen to become an officer in the Dutch army.

He served in the army for seven years and then left active duty to become a reserve officer; his highest rank was that of lieutenant colonel. Shortly after his active military career he started to perform in the Netherlands but also in the Dutch East Indies.

When Vogel left active duty he became active as a teacher; he taught the art of declamation at the Hogere Krijgsschool (Higher Military School) and at Leiden University. He was active as room recitator of Queen Elisabeth of Romania and was the founder of the Maatschappij tot bevordering van de Woordkunst (Society for the Advancement of the Art of Words). He was from 1926 to 1931 chairman of the Haagse Kunstkring (Art society of The Hague) and was appointed an honorary member, in 1930, by the "Société Académique d'Histoire Internationale de Paris".

He died after a short illness, aged 59. His funeral was held at a Catholic cemetery in The Hague. He was remembered by a special meeting at the Haagsche Kunstkring. He was officer in the Order of Orange-Nassau, komtur in the Order of the Crown of Romania and received several other decorations.

== Family ==
He and his wife, Ellen Buwalda (1890-1985), who wed in 1916, had three children: Louis Albert Anthing Vogel Jr. (1924–1982), who wrote a biography of Dutch writer Louis Couperus, and actress Ellen Vogel (1922-2015).

== Works ==
- (in Dutch) 1910. Het Japanse toneel
- (in Dutch) 1917. Je Maintiendrai (een boek voor leger en volk)
- (in Dutch) 1918. Voordrachtskunst
- (in Dutch) 1927. Dialogen
- (in Dutch) 1931. Rhetorica
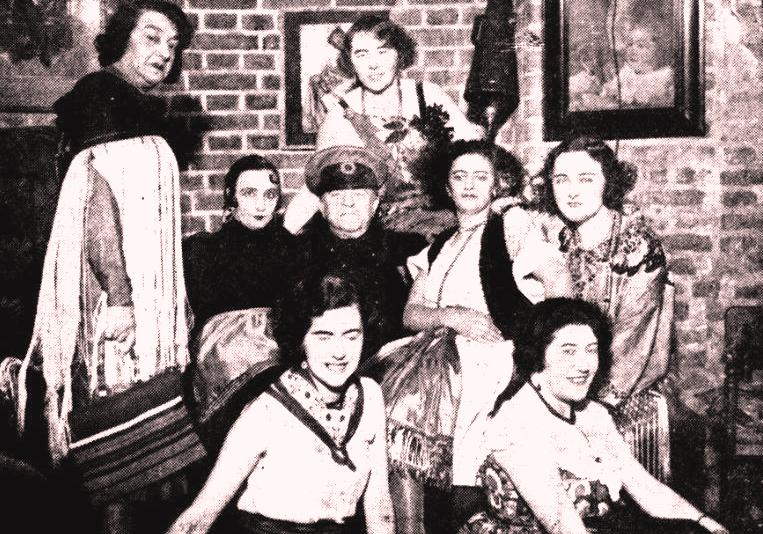
Albert Vogel in 1930 at the Kunstkring

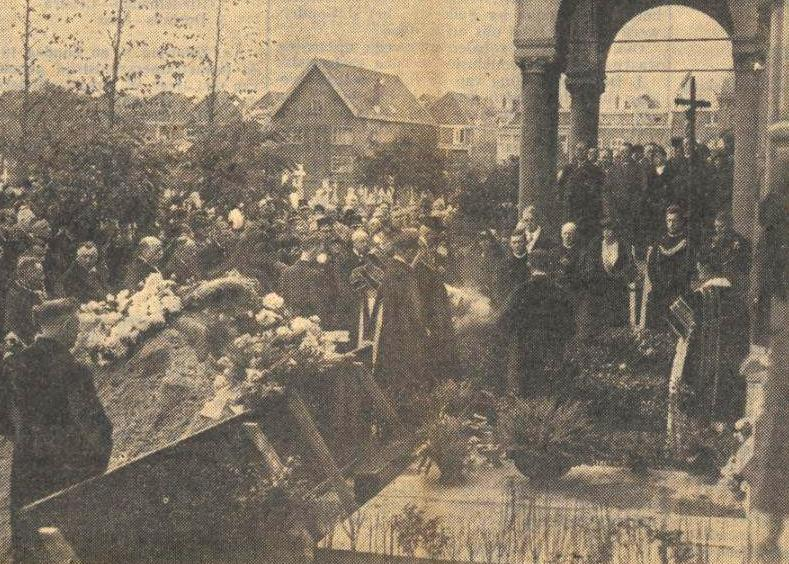
Funeral of Albert Vogel (photo published in the Limburgs Dagblad

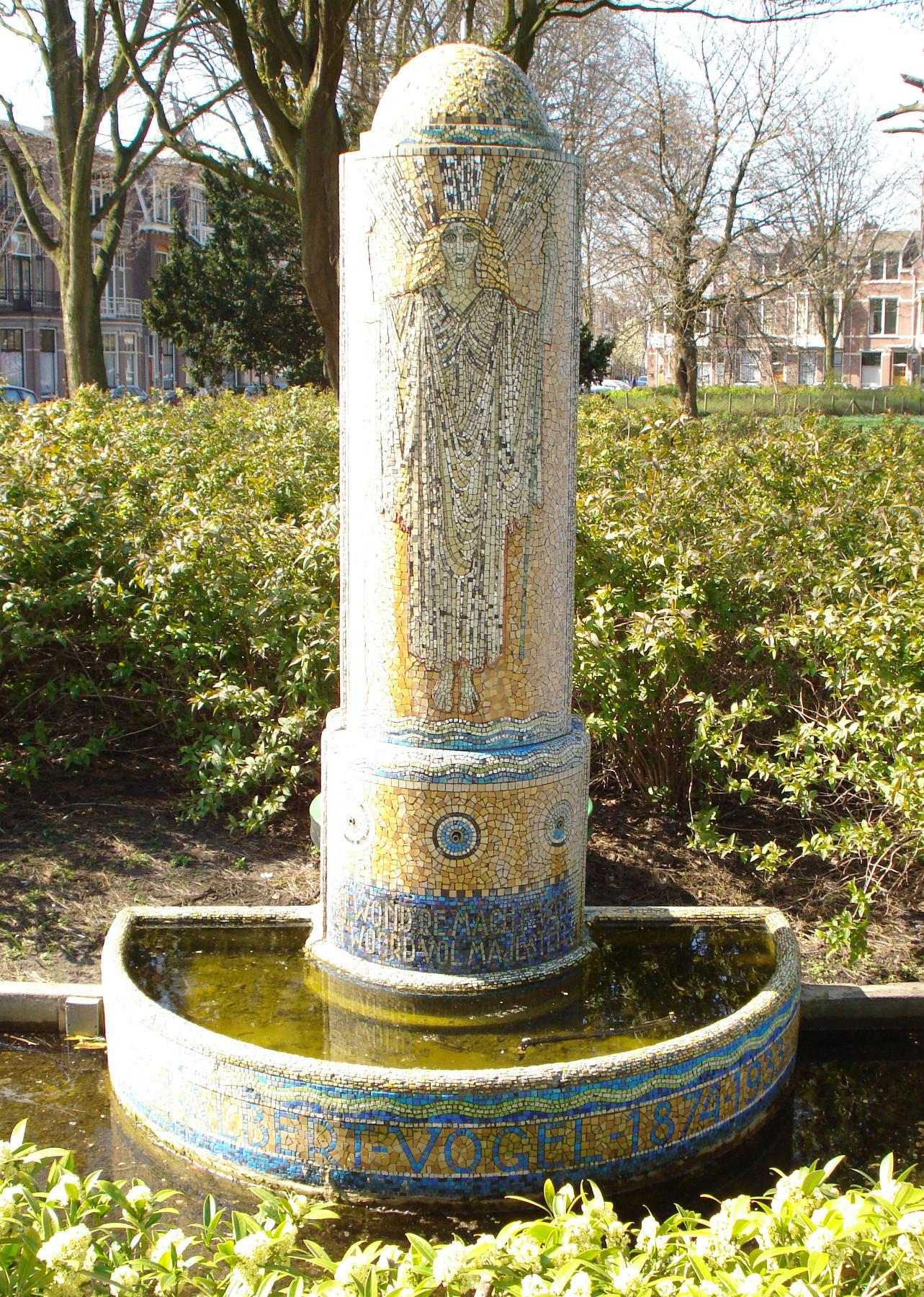
Monument dedicated to Albert Vogel in The Hague

== Sources ==
- (in Dutch) Vogel on the website of the Dutch Historical Institute, biography written by Caroline de Westenholz
- (in Dutch) Vogel on the Dutch Theater Institute
