= Williswinde =

Book by Louis Couperus

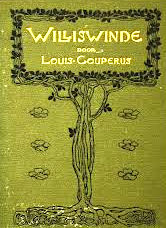
- Cover of Williswinde
- Author: Louis Couperus
- Original title: 'Williswinde'
- Language: Dutch
- Publisher: L.J. Veen
- Publication date: 1895
- Publication place: Netherlands
- Pages: 94

Williswinde is a collection of verses written by Dutch writer Louis Couperus. The first edition (1.250 books were printed for this edition) was published by L.J. Veen in 1895. In 1904 Veen acquired full rights of Williswinde and 16 other works that were written by Couperus. For the first edition in 1894 Couperus received 200 guilders and the poems by that time had already been published in a number of Dutch newspapers and magazines. However Couperus had some difficulty to get the poem Williswinde published, as he wrote in a letter to a colleague, Smit Kleine. The book cover was designed by painter Ludwig Willem Reymert Wenckebach.

== Description ==
The content of Williswinde was: Voorrede (Preface), Weemoed (Melancholy), Viviane, Williswinde, Ginevra, Semiramis, Fragmenten uit Johannes' Apocalyps (Fragments from the Book of Revelation of John) and Verantwoording (Accountability). The verses were written in iambs. In a review in the Algemeen Handelsblad a critic wrote: it is a pity that Couperus begins most of his verses with "wandered", "exercised", "since" and "exulted". In the poems Couperus let's himself be intoxicated with the splendor of his words while the content is rather poor. The Soerabaijasch Handelsblad wrote in April 1896: The title "Williswinde" sounds like a soft birdsong. It is a pity that the content is not sweet like the name "Williswinde" but gives the reader a feeling that is cold as ice. Couperus himself wrote in the preface of Williswinde: "I will probably never write anything more what one might call poetry. But the poetry I have written - however one may judge - was written with a naive love that is still within me."

Earlier, on 5 January 1893 Couperus suggested to L.J. Veen to publish his poetry that had not been published as a collection before, under the title Williswinde, because he had no new work to offer. When the book was published with a book cover designed by Ludwig Willem Reymert Wenckebach Couperus was not pleased with the cover. He wrote to Veen: The book cover has a dirty colour and has something that reminds me of Gartenlaube am Rhine, where we drank Rhine wine. A parody of Williswinde was later published in the Dutch magazine "De Kroniek"; during that time editor in chief was writer Frans Coenen, who, later in time became, together with Couperus, editor of the Dutch magazine "Groot Nederland".

== Gallery ==
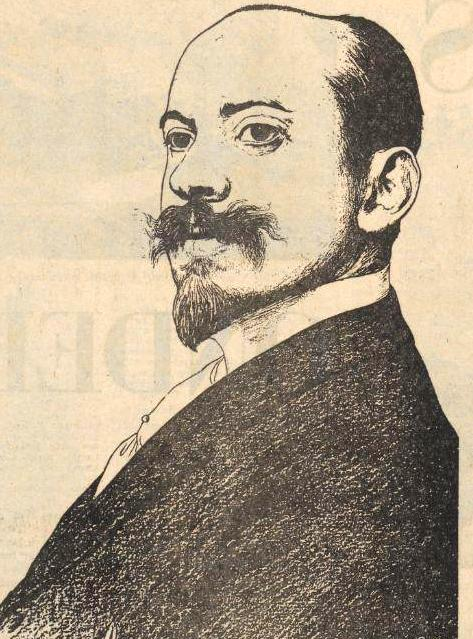
Louis Couperus was the author of Williswinde

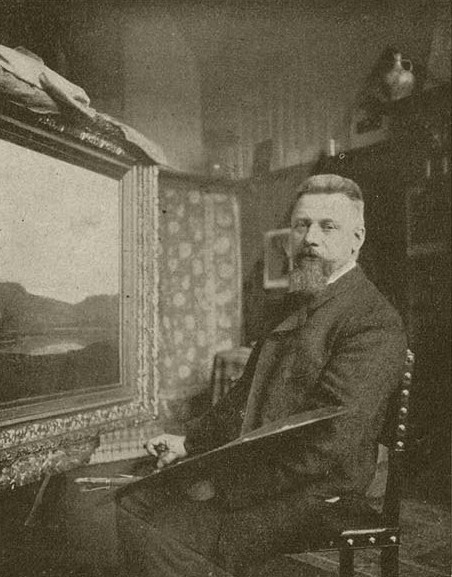
The book cover of Williswinde was made by Ludwig Willem Reymert Wenckebach

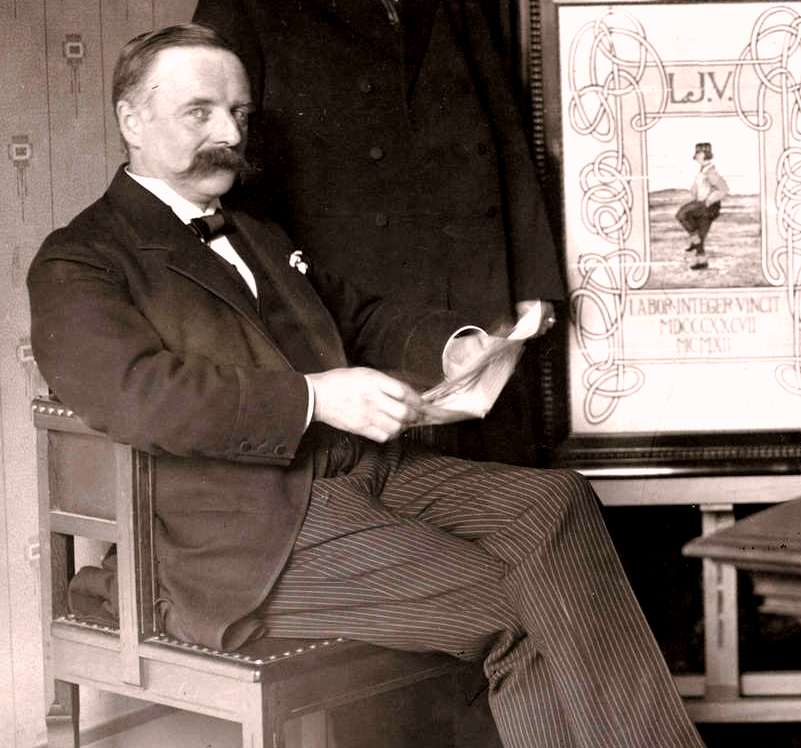
Williswinde was published by publisher L.J. Veen
