= First De Geer cabinet =

Cabinet of the Netherlands, 1926 to 1929

- Cabinet of the Netherlands

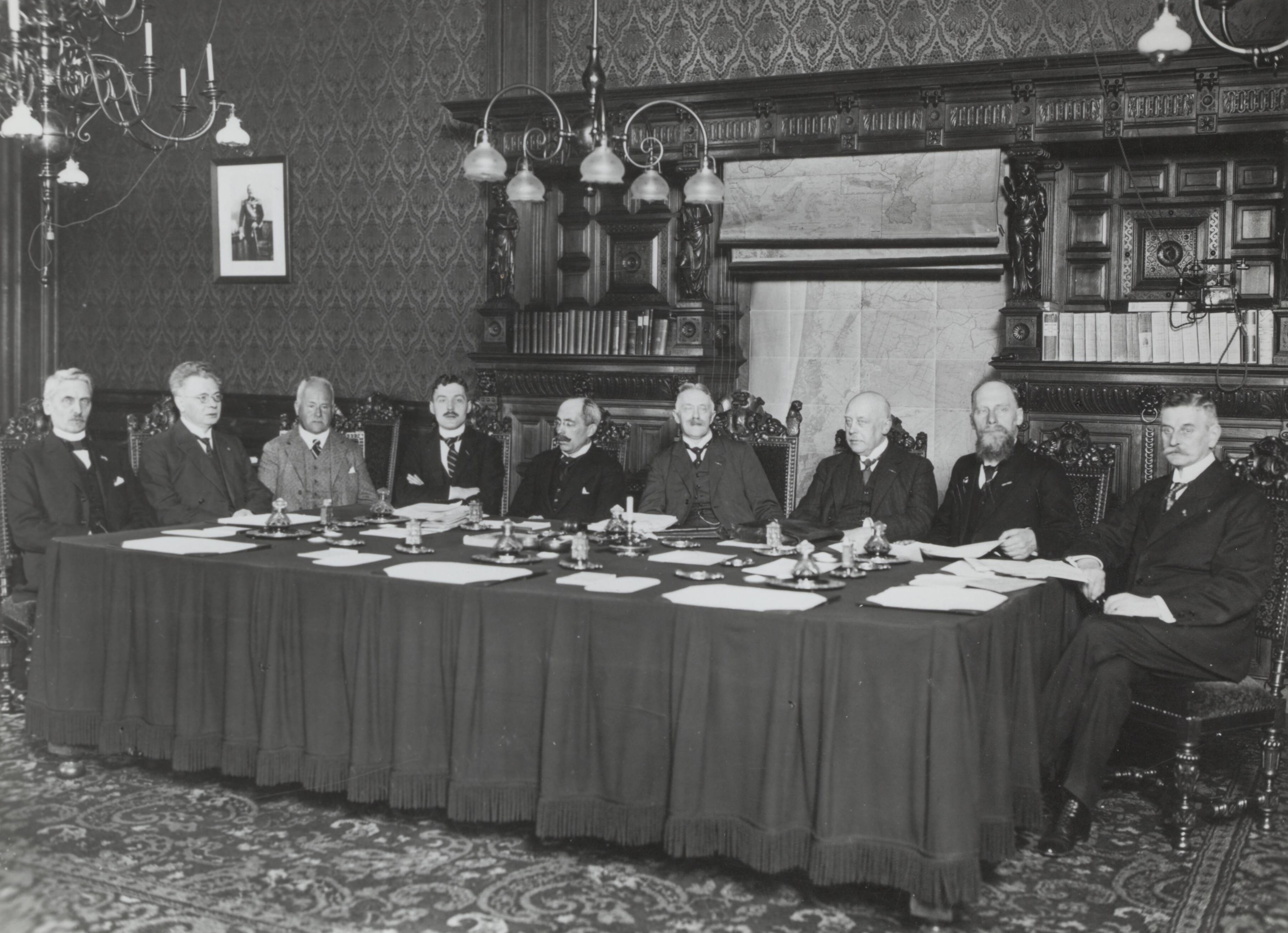
- Meeting of the First De Geer cabinet on 12 March 1926
- Date formed: 8 March 1926
- Date dissolved: 10 August 1929 (Demissionary from 3 July 1929)

People and organisations
- Head of state: Queen Wilhelmina
- Head of government: Dirk Jan de Geer
- No. of ministers: 9
- Ministers removed: 2
- Total no. of members: 11
- Member party: Roman Catholic State Party; Anti-Revolutionary Party; Christian Historical Union
- Status in legislature: Centre-right majority government

History
- Legislature terms: 1925–1929
- Predecessor: First Colijn cabinet
- Successor: Third Ruijs de Beerenbrouck cabinet

The First De Geer cabinet was the cabinet of the Netherlands from 8 March 1926 until 10 August 1929. The cabinet was formed by the political parties Roman Catholic State Party (RKSP), Anti-Revolutionary Party (ARP) and the Christian Historical Union (CHU) following the fall of the First Colijn cabinet on 11 November 1925.

== Composition ==
Composition
Title	Minister			Term of office	
Title	Image	Name	Party	Start	End
Chairman of the Council of Ministers; Minister of Finance	Dirk Jan de Geer	Dirk Jan de Geer	CHU	8 March 1926	10 August 1929
Minister of the Interior and Agriculture	Jan Kan	Jan Kan	Indep. (Note: Liberal)	8 March 1926	10 August 1929
Minister of Foreign Affairs	Herman van Karnebeek	Herman van Karnebeek	Indep.	8 March 1926	1 April 1927
Minister of Foreign Affairs	Frans Beelaerts van Blokland	Frans Beelaerts van Blokland	CHU	1 April 1927	10 August 1929
Minister of Justice	Jan Donner	Jan Donner	ARP	8 March 1926	10 August 1929
Minister of Labour, Commerce and Industry	Jan Rudolph Slotemaker de Bruïne	Jan Rudolph Slotemaker de Bruïne	CHU	8 March 1926	10 August 1929
Minister of War (1926–1928); Minister of the Navy (1926–1928); Minister of Defence (1928–1929)	Louis van Royen	Louis van Royen	Indep.	8 March 1926	24 April 1926
Minister of War (1926–1928); Minister of the Navy (1926–1928); Minister of Defence (1928–1929)	Johan Lambooij	Johan Lambooij	RKSP	24 April 1926	10 August 1929
Minister of Education, Arts and Sciences	Marius Waszink	Marius Waszink	RKSP	8 March 1926	10 August 1929
Minister of Water Management	Hendrik van der Vegte	Hendrik van der Vegte	ARP	8 March 1926	10 August 1929
Minister of Colonial Affairs	Jacob Koningsberger	Jacob Koningsberger	Indep.	8 March 1926	10 August 1929
