= Third Ruijs de Beerenbrouck cabinet =

Cabinet of the Netherlands, 1929 to 1933

- Cabinet of the Netherlands

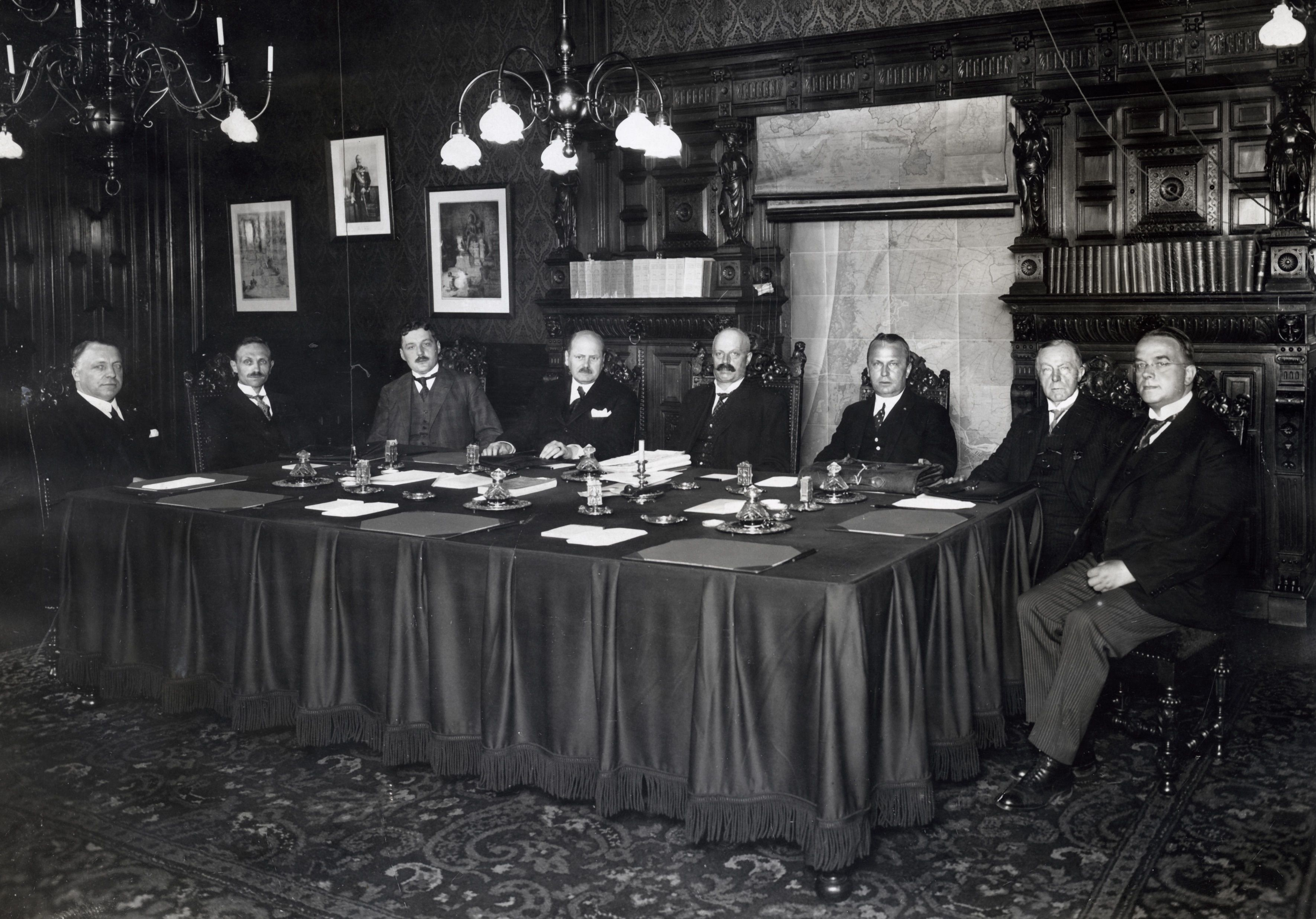
- The first meeting of the Third Ruijs de Beerenbrouck cabinet on 10 August 1929
- Date formed: 10 August 1929
- Date dissolved: 26 May 1933 (Demissionary from 15 May 1933)

People and organisations
- Head of state: Queen Wilhelmina
- Head of government: Charles Ruijs de Beerenbrouck
- No. of ministers: 9
- Member party: Roman Catholic State Party; Anti-Revolutionary Party; Christian Historical Union
- Status in legislature: Centre-right majority government

History
- Election: 1929 general election
- Legislature terms: 1929–1933
- Predecessor: First De Geer cabinet
- Successor: Second Colijn cabinet

The Third Ruijs de Beerenbrouck cabinet was the cabinet of the Netherlands from 10 August 1929 until 26 May 1933. The cabinet was formed by the political parties Roman Catholic State Party (RKSP), Anti-Revolutionary Party (ARP) and the Christian Historical Union (CHU) after the 1929 general election. The centre-right cabinet was a majority government in the House of Representatives. It was the last of three cabinets of Charles Ruijs de Beerenbrouck as Chairman of the Council of Ministers.

== Composition ==
Composition
Title	Minister			Term of office	
Title	Image	Name	Party	Start	End
Chairman of the Council of Ministers; Minister of Interior and Agriculture (1929–1932); Minister of Interior (1932–1933)	Charles Ruijs de Beerenbrouck	Charles Ruijs de Beerenbrouck	RKSP	10 August 1929	26 May 1933
Minister of Foreign Affairs	Frans Beelaerts van Blokland	Frans Beelaerts van Blokland	CHU	10 August 1929	20 April 1933
Minister of Foreign Affairs	Charles Ruijs de Beerenbrouck	Charles Ruijs de Beerenbrouck (ad interim)	RKSP	20 April 1933	26 May 1933
Minister of Finance	Dirk Jan de Geer	Dirk Jan de Geer	CHU	10 August 1929	26 May 1933
Minister of Justice	Jan Donner	Jan Donner	ARP	10 August 1929	26 May 1933
Minister of Labour, Commerce and Industry (1929–1932); Minister of Economic Affairs and Labour (1932–1933)	Timotheus Verschuur	Timotheus Verschuur	RKSP	10 August 1929	26 May 1933
Minister of Defence	Laurent Deckers	Laurent Deckers	RKSP	10 August 1929	26 May 1933
Minister of Education, Arts and Sciences	Jan Terpstra	Jan Terpstra	ARP	10 August 1929	26 May 1933
Minister of Water Management	Paul Reymer	Paul Reymer	RKSP	10 August 1929	26 May 1933
Minister of Colonial Affairs	Simon de Graaff	Simon de Graaff	Indep. (Note: Conservative (Protestant))	10 August 1929	26 May 1933
