= Third Colijn cabinet =

Cabinet of the Netherlands, 1935 to 1937

- Cabinet of the Netherlands

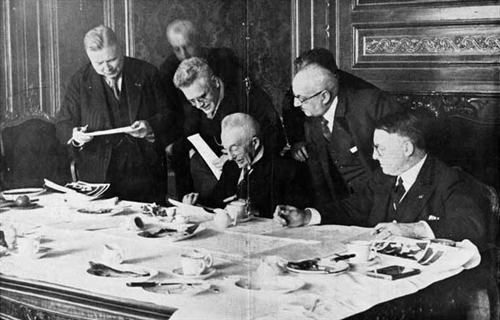
- Meeting of the Third Colijn cabinet in 1936
- Date formed: 31 July 1935
- Date dissolved: 24 June 1937 (Demissionary from 25 May 1937)

People and organisations
- Head of state: Queen Wilhelmina
- Head of government: Hendrikus Colijn
- No. of ministers: 10
- Member party: Roman Catholic State Party (RKSP); Anti-Revolutionary Party (ARP); Christian Historical Union (CHU); Liberal State Party (LSP); Free-thinking Democratic League (VDB)
- Status in legislature: Majority government

History
- Legislature terms: 1933–1937
- Predecessor: Second Colijn cabinet
- Successor: Fourth Colijn cabinet

The Third Colijn cabinet was the cabinet of the Netherlands from 31 July 1935 until 24 June 1937. The cabinet was formed by the Roman Catholic State Party (RKSP), Anti-Revolutionary Party (ARP), Christian Historical Union (CHU), Liberal State Party (LSP) and the Free-thinking Democratic League (VDB) after the resignation of the Second Colijn cabinet on 23 July 1935. The centre-right cabinet was a majority government in the House of Representatives and was a continuation of the previous Colijn II cabinet. It was the third of five cabinets of Hendrikus Colijn, the Leader of the Anti-Revolutionary Party as chairman of the Council of Ministers.

== Composition ==
Composition
Title	Minister			Term of office	
Title	Image	Name	Party	Start	End
Chairman of the Council of Ministers; Minister of Colonial Affairs	Hendrikus Colijn	Hendrikus Colijn	ARP	31 July 1935	24 June 1937
Minister of the Interior	Jacob Adriaan de Wilde	Jacob Adriaan de Wilde	ARP	31 July 1935	24 June 1937
Minister of Foreign Affairs	Andries Cornelis Dirk de Graeff	Andries Cornelis Dirk de Graeff	Indep. (Note: Liberal)	31 July 1935	24 June 1937
Minister of Finance	Pieter Oud	Pieter Oud	VDB	31 July 1935	24 June 1937
Minister of Justice	Josef van Schaik	Josef van Schaik	RKSP	31 July 1935	24 June 1937
Minister of Economic Affairs (1935); Minister of Commerce, Industry and Shipping (1935–1937)	Henri Gelissen	Henri Gelissen	RKSP	31 July 1935	24 June 1937
Minister of Defence	Laurent Deckers	Laurent Deckers	RKSP	31 July 1935	2 September 1935
Minister of Defence	Hendrikus Colijn	Hendrikus Colijn	ARP	2 September 1935	24 June 1937
Minister of Social Affairs	Marcus Slingenberg	Marcus Slingenberg	VDB	31 July 1935	24 June 1937
Minister of Education, Arts and Sciences	Jan Rudolph Slotemaker de Bruïne	Jan Rudolph Slotemaker de Bruïne	CHU	31 July 1935	24 June 1937
Minister of Water Management	Otto van Lidth de Jeude	Otto van Lidth de Jeude	LSP	31 July 1935	24 June 1937
Minister of Agriculture and Fisheries	Laurent Deckers	Laurent Deckers	RKSP	2 September 1935	24 June 1937
