= Henri Marchant =

Dutch politician

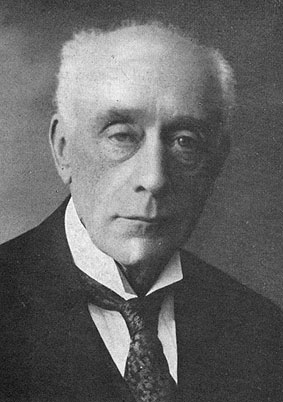
- Marchant in or before 1938

Minister of Education, Arts and Sciences
- In office 26 May 1933 – 18 May 1935
- Cabinet: Colijn II
- Preceded by: Jan Terpstra
- Succeeded by: Jan Rudolph Slotemaker de Bruïne

Parliamentary leader of the Free-thinking Democratic League
- In office 16 mei 1916 – 27 May 1933
- Preceded by: Dirk Bos
- Succeeded by: Dolf Joekes

Member of the House of Representatives
- In office 8 June 1900 – 27 May 1933
- Preceded by: Willem Hendrik de Beaufort
- Succeeded by: Dirk Kooiman
- Constituency: Deventer (1900–1918)

Personal details
- Born: Hendrik Pieter Marchant; 12 February 1869 Deventer, Netherlands
- Died: 12 May 1956 (aged 87) The Hague, Netherlands
- Party: Liberal (until 1901); VDB (1901–1935 and 1952); RKSP (1935–1945)
- Relatives: Mien Marchant (sister)
- Education: Leiden University

Hendrik Pieter "Henri" Marchant (12 February 1869 – 12 May 1956) was a Dutch politician who served as a member of parliament from 1900 until 1933, and as education minister from 1933 until 1935.

First elected to the House of Representatives in 1900, he was a co-founder of the Free-thinking Democratic League (VDB) the next year, and became the party's parliamentary leader in 1916. He was a sharp debater and a feared opponent, and left a deep imprint on his party. In parliament, he led the charge for women's suffrage, which was achieved in 1919. He opposed the confessional Coalition cabinets of the early interwar period, but joined a government of national unity in 1933 as Minister of Education, Arts, and Sciences. After a brief and largely unsuccessful ministership, he resigned in 1935 following controversy regarding his conversion to Catholicism.

== Early life and education ==
Hendrik Pieter Marchant was born in Deventer on 12 February 1869 to Carel Anthonij Marchant, a public prosecutor in that city, and Apollonia Jacoba van der Horst. The later artist Mien Marchant was his sister. Marchant went to study law at Leiden University in 1888, and received his doctorate there with a dissertation entitled Begrip en gevolg van belediging in het burgerlijk recht ("Concept and consequences of defamation in civil law") in 1894. In the same year, he moved back to his place of birth to set up practice as a solicitor and barrister. In 1897, he was elected to the municipal council of Deventer, and in 1899 he became alderman responsible for the city's finances, social welfare and hospital.

== Tenure in Parliament, 1900–1933 ==
=== Early tenure ===
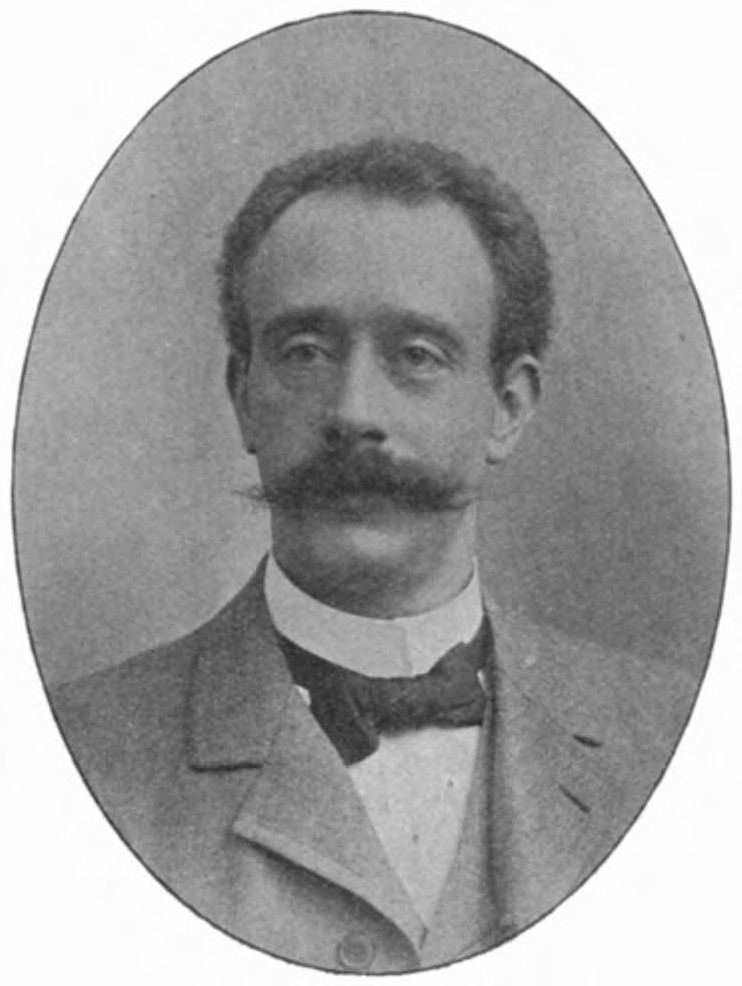
Marchant shortly after the start of his tenure in 1901

As a candidate for the Radical League, Marchant contested a 1900 parliamentary by-election in the district of Deventer triggered by the death of incumbent member Willem Hendrik de Beaufort. He defeated the Free Liberal candidate Samuel van Houten, and was installed as a member of the House of Representatives on 8 June of that year. In the House, he joined the Free-thinking Democratic parliamentary group, comprising progressive liberals favouring the expansion of suffrage, and in 1901, he was one of the founding members of the corresponding political party, the Free-thinking Democratic League.

Marchant left a significant imprint on the Free-thinking Democratic League throughout his political career. He served as the party's chairman between 1905 and 1908, and became the leader of its parliamentary group in 1916. From 1911 onwards, he wrote political columns for the party publications Vragen des Tijds and De Opbouw, and sat on the editorial board of both. He also frequently contributed to De Vrijzinnig-Democraat. His domineering behaviour within the party earned him the nickname "the general", to which he was positively disposed.

In parliament, Marchant gained a reputation as combative and militant, and possessing a critical mind. Whenever he took on those he disliked or encountered matters he deemed unjust, he stopped at nothing and left little standing. He was feared in debate and usually came out on top; his arguments were clear, sharp and witty, with a touch of banter. In debate, however, he often took a one-sided stance; he rarely realised that a matter could have different sides to it. If he changed his mind, he was quick to forget that he had thought differently only a short while before. He was sometimes called le tigre neerlandais, in reference to Georges Clemenceau.

=== Women's suffrage ===
One of Marchant's most famous legislative achievements was the introduction of women's suffrage. The Pacification of 1917 had resulted in the introduction of universal male suffrage, as well as passive suffrage (the right to stand for election) for women. The 1918 general election saw the election of the women to parliament for the first time; the famous women's suffrage activist Aletta Jacobs was placed high on the VDB's candidate list, but narrowly missed out on a seat. While the VDB and the Social Democratic Workers' Party (SDAP) had wanted to extend active suffrage (the right to vote) to women as well, this was a bridge too far for the confessional parties. However, the matter was left out of the Constitution, such that women's suffrage could be introduced by law.

The 1918 election led to the formation of a confessional Coalition cabinet which was unlikely to make use of this opportunity, so Marchant took it upon himself to introduce a private member's bill. In the wake of the November Revolution in Germany and the Red Week the Netherlands, prime minister Charles Ruijs de Beerenbrouck declared that the cabinet would not oppose Marchant's effort for women's suffrage. This declaration, intended to address the calls for reform, was made against the wishes of the majority of his cabinet, but his colleagues went along with it. Marchant defended the bill in parliament, and it was approved in the House of Representatives on 9 May 1919 by 64 votes to 10, and in the Senate on 10 July of that year by 34 votes to 5. Opposition came only from among the ranks of the Protestant parties, most notably the Anti-Revolutionary Party (ARP).

=== Opposition to the Coalition ===
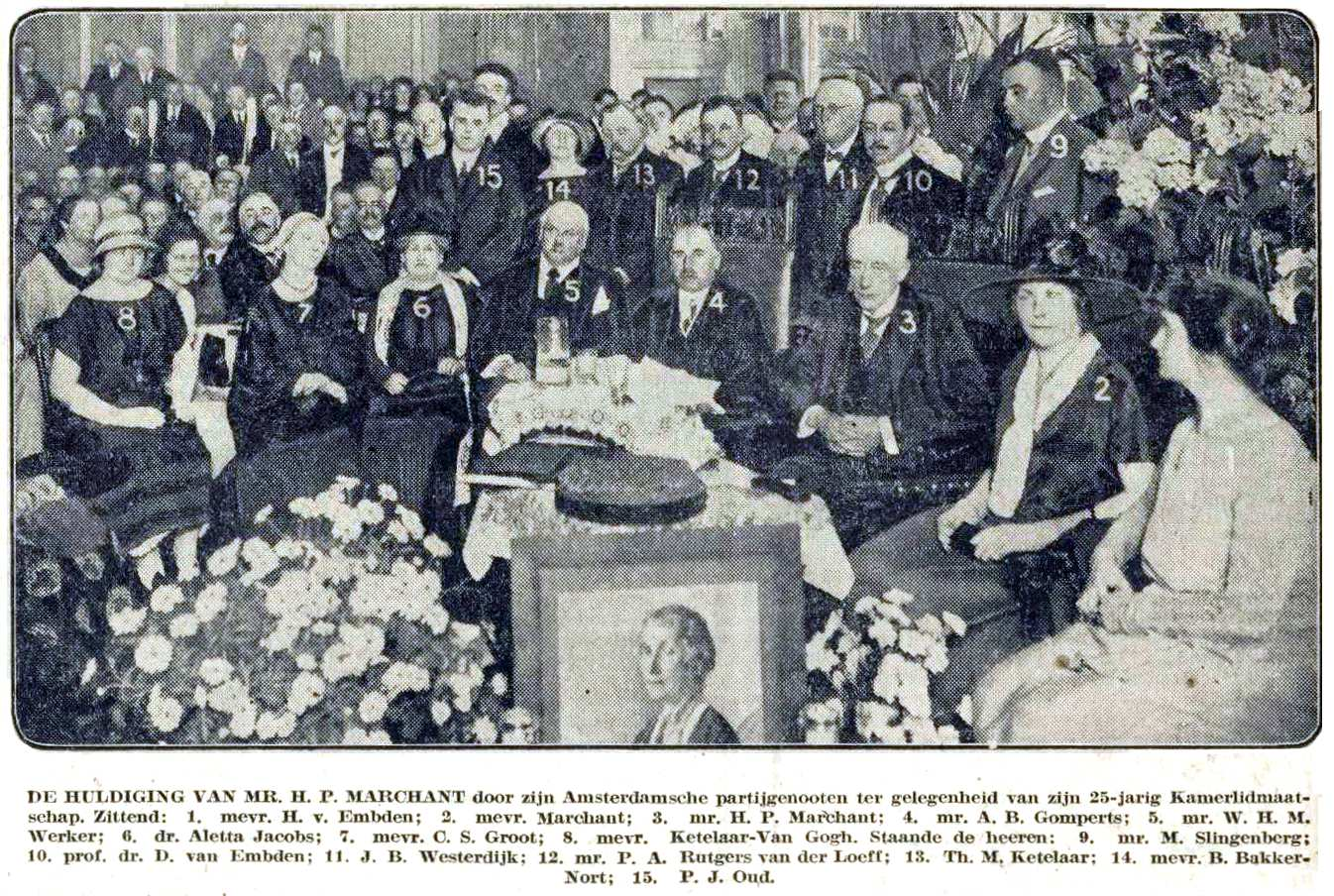
The VDB celebrated Marchant's 25-year tenure in parliament in 1925. Marchant is on right, marked with a 3.

Marchant strongly opposed the confessional Coalition cabinets that governed uninterruptedly from 1918 to 1933, and the party's stated goal was to break down existing party divisions. The Pacification of 1917 had resulted in the equal financing of religious schools, and thus in an end to the school struggle. This, in Marchant's view, meant that the division between confessional and secular parties represented by the antithesis theory no longer had any basis for existence, and ought to be replaced by cooperation between groups on both sides of the old dividing line on the basis of a democratic programme. A logical conclusion of this view was that the SDAP should not be categorically excluded from government participation.

One area in which Marchant provided opposition to the Coalition cabinets was on the matter of defence; with his anti-militarist stance, he frequently thwarted successive ministers of war. After World War I, he pushed for cuts in the military budget, stating that the general exhaustion provisionally ruled out the continuation of warfare. During the debate on the war budget in 1919, Marchant sought to see military expenditure significantly reduced; he would only approve expenditure necessary to keep the forces operational. He managed to secure cuts to this budget on so many points that the minister of war, George Alting von Geusau, resigned. In 1922, he advocated limiting military activity to border control, and in October 1923 he helped to defeat the naval bill. In November 1924, the VDB replaced the military clause with the principle of national disarmament. During the debate on the Foreign Affairs budget in December 1924, Marchant therefore argued for the abolition of an independent armed forces.

Marchant's main political opponent was Hendrikus Colijn, the leader of the ARP who became prime minister in August 1925. In October of that year, the two clashed when Marchant stated in parliament that Colijn's promise was worthless, in reference to an earlier commitment by Colijn that civil servants would receive a compensatory payment in 1925, which had not materialised because a condition had not been met. Colijn felt personally offended by this remark, and it took mediation by Catholic leader Wiel Nolens to defuse the situation somewhat.

Marchant's opposition to the Coalition reached a climax in November 1925. In the debate on the Foreign Affairs budget, Gerrit Hendrik Kersten, leader of the Reformed Political Party (SGP), tabled a motion to scrap the budget for the diplomatic mission of the Netherlands to the Holy See. Adoption of this motion would lead the Roman Catholic State Party (RKSP) to vote against the budget, and would therefore imperil the Coalition. Marchant saw this as an opportunity to exploit divisions between Coalition parties, and supported the motion, which was subsequently adopted, leading to the fall of Colijn's first cabinet. Marchant was subsequently appointed formateur, tasked with forming a new government. His attempt to form a centre-left cabinet comprising the VDB, the SDAP and the RKSP was met with opposition from the latter, who held onto the Nolens Doctrine, stating that they would collaborate with the SDAP only in cases of "utmost necessity".

=== Municipal politics ===
During his tenure in parliament, Marchant was also active in the local politics of The Hague. He had moved to the city in 1901, and continued his practice as a solicitor there. He became a member of the municipal council on 27 August 1923, and of the municipal executive on 27 August 1931. In this capacity, he was responsible for education in the city. He served in both offices until his appointment as minister in 1933.

== Ministership, 1933–1935 ==
=== Policy and legislation ===
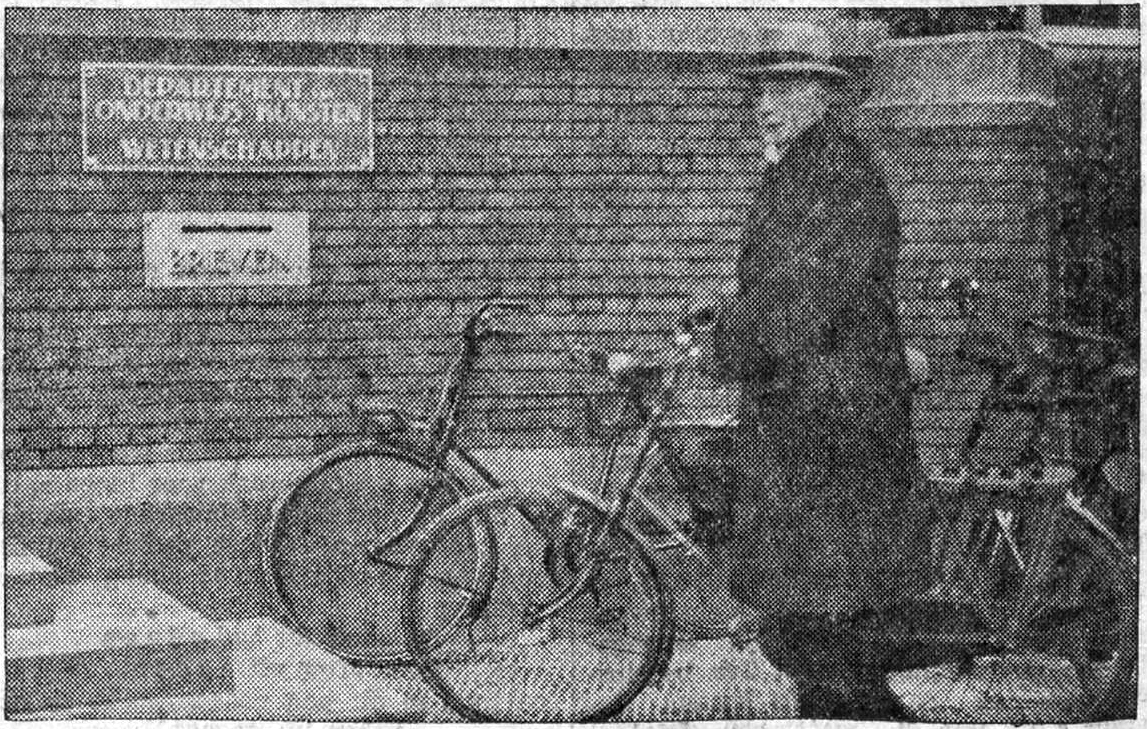
Marchant arriving at his new ministry building by bike in 1934

In 1933, amid the Great Depression, the second Colijn cabinet was formed as a government of national unity comprising the Coalition parties, the Liberal State Party (LSP) and the VDB. Alongside Pieter Oud, Marchant was one of two VDB members to take part in the government, taking office as Minister of Education, Arts and Sciences on 26 May of that year. Marchant's ministership, which was entirely characterised by austerity measures, was less successful. He lacked sufficient tact and, moreover, left virtually everything, save for a few matters of particular interest to him, to his director-general, Gerrit van Poelje. This created too great a distance between him and his subordinates, depriving him of a comprehensive range of information. Consequently, he often encountered fierce opposition in parliament and, in the long run, even faced resistance from within his own party.

He often found himself stuck between conflicting demands from the left and the right. As part of cost-cutting measures, he imposed a consolidation of public schools, but was made to leave religious schools intact, which was criticised by the left. Another difficult measure was that of married female schoolteachers. In 1933, the right sought to oblige municipalities to dismiss female schoolteachers upon marriage, to the great displeasure of the left. Marchant asked that the initiative in this matter be left to the government, but came up with the proposal himself a year later; an amendment of the 1920 Lower Education Act to this effect was passed in 1935.

Marchant explaining his proposed spelling reform in a 1934 newsreel

In 1934, Marchant made an attempt at spelling reform. The reform was a compromise of the traditional De Vries and Te Winkel spelling and the proposals at simplification made by Roeland Anthonie Kollewijn and his Association for a Simplified Spelling. It comprised the dropping of the inflectional ending -n, the consistent spelling of e and o in open syllables as opposed to ee and oo, and the change from sch to s where only an s was pronounced. Marchant's proposal was so fiercely attacked in parliament by Protestant, Catholic and liberal parties that Marchant had to settle for the compromise that his spelling would only be compulsory in school examinations, whilst in a number of cases the -n ending would be retained. Marchant also faced fierce criticism outside of parliament, particularly from historian the Johan Huizinga. Nevertheless, his compromise was formally prescribed for government and education by decree in both the Netherlands and Belgium shortly after World War II.

=== Resignation ===
During his ministership, Marchant, who had been raised in the Dutch Reformed Church, converted to Catholicism. He later explained that he had grown up in an atmosphere of positivism, which increasingly failed to satisfy him. The opportunity to seek greater fulfilment arose as soon as he came into official contact with the Catholic world in his capacity as a minister. The increasingly evident negativity of communism and Nazism soon led him to see Catholicism as the only positive counterforce. He was baptised in the Catholic Church in December 1934, but initially kept this a secret because he wanted to spare both the government and his party, for as long as possible, the difficulties that would logically result from his decision. By Easter 1935, however, it became apparent that, in speeches delivered at public events, Marchant voiced opinions that closely aligned with Catholic beliefs on ethical, aesthetic, educational and historical issues, and rumours of his possible conversion to Catholicism began to circulate.

When Pieter Oud and the party leadership asked him to respond to the rumours, he took this as a breach of party principles, which stated that religious beliefs were a private matter, and resigned his membership. In the Council of Ministers meeting on 7 May 1935, Marchant declared that he had converted and resigned his party membership, but that he saw no need to resign as minister. Oud believed that, since Catholics were expected to support the RKSP, Marchant's decision had put him and the VDB in an impossible position, and he wrote to prime minister Colijn threatening to resign if Marchant remained in his post. Colijn also foresaw that Marchant would face strong opposition in parliament following his conversion. Colijn therefore urged Marchant to resign. On 11 May, Marchant asked Queen Wilhelmina to accept his resignation, which was granted on 17 May.

== Later life ==
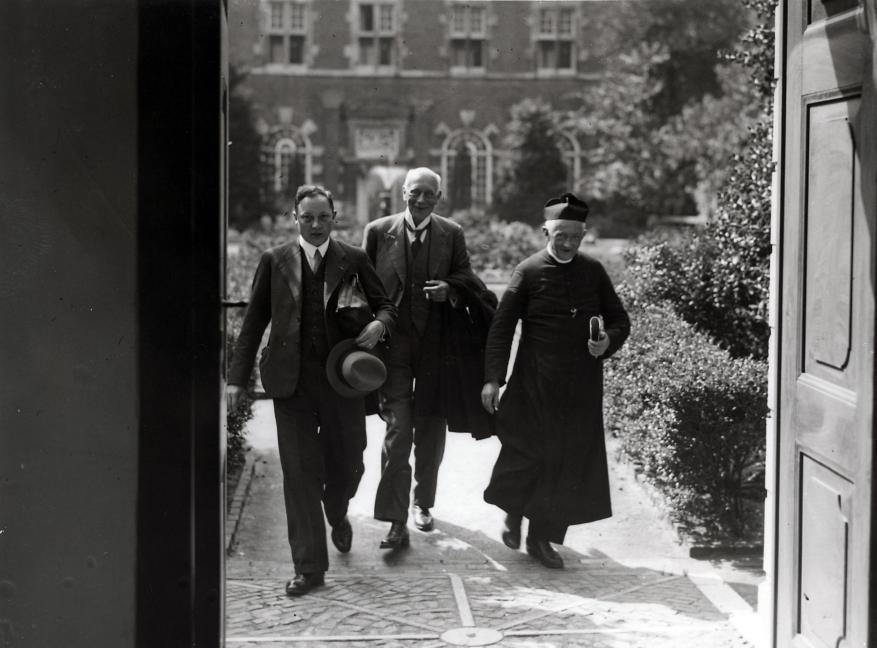
Marchant (centre) at the Rolduc abbey in 1935

Marchant's baptism became publicly known only after his resignation, and led to much controversy. Marchant retired from politics, though he frequently commented on politics in writings and speeches. He acted as a defender of the Catholic faith and repeatedly pointed out the dangers of Nazism. In Een staatkundige epidemie: Het ziektebeeld van het Dietse nationaal-socialisme ("A political epidemic: The clinical picture of Dutch national socialism", 1936) and De zelfmoord der kiezers ("The suicide of the voters", 1937), he attacked the National Socialist Movement in his familiar, unsparing manner.

After World War II he was counted among the hard-right Catholics, and he sympathised with the Catholic National Party. He often criticised government policy in the Catholic paper De Maasbode. He also came into conflict with the Schermerhorn–Drees cabinet. Marchant had been co-founder and subsequently became chairman of the foundation De Hooge Veluwe in 1935, but the foundation's statutes were amended by the German occupation authorities in 1942 to exclude him from the chairmanship. After the War, the cabinet sought to maintain the statutes in their amended form. Marchant disputed this decision and the Raad voor het Rechtsherstel ruled in his favour, allowing him to resume his chairmanship from 1 January 1951.

Marchant died in The Hague on 12 May 1956, at the age of 87.

== Private life ==
Henri Marchant was married to Sara Maria Magdalena Rambonnet on 10 August 1901. The couple remained childless.
