= Laurent Deckers =

Dutch politician (1883–1978)

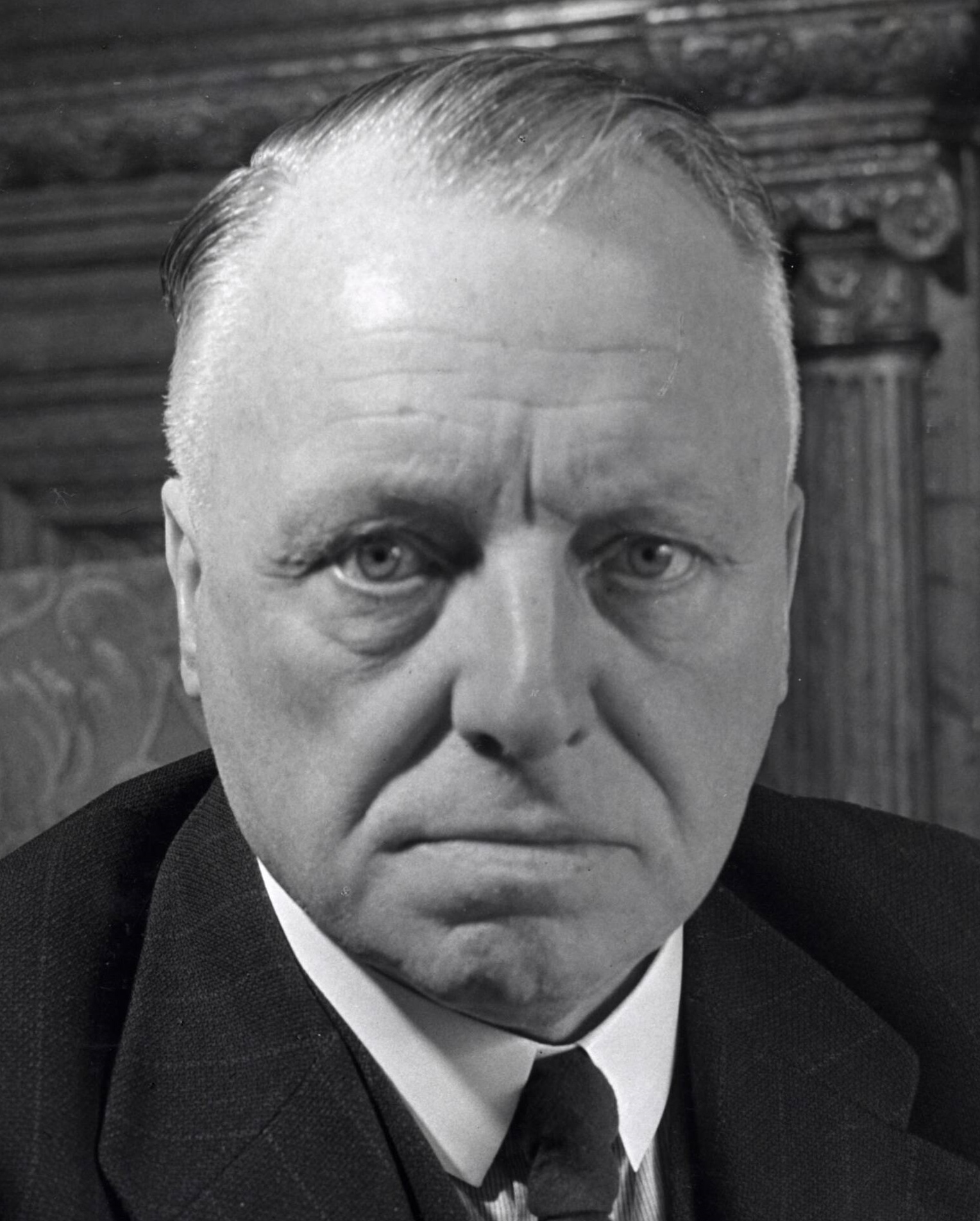
- Deckers in 1949

Member of the Council of State
- In office 1 April 1946 – 1 March 1958
- Vice President: Frans Beelaerts van Blokland (1946–1956); Bram Rutgers (1956–1958)

Parliamentary leader in the House of Representatives
- In office 22 December 1945 – 1 April 1946
- Preceded by: Office established
- Succeeded by: Frans Teulings

Chairman of the Catholic People's Party
- In office 22 December 1945 – 1 April 1946
- Leader: Carl Romme
- Preceded by: Office established
- Succeeded by: Piet Witteman

Chairman of the Roman Catholic State Party
- In office 1 September 1941 – 22 December 1945
- Leader: Himself
- Preceded by: Timotheus Verschuur
- Succeeded by: Office discontinued

Leader of the Roman Catholic State Party
- In office 11 November 1937 – 22 December 1945
- Preceded by: Josef van Schaik
- Succeeded by: Office discontinued

Parliamentary leader in the House of Representatives
- In office 11 November 1937 – 22 December 1945
- Preceded by: Josef van Schaik
- Succeeded by: Office discontinued

Minister of Agriculture and Fisheries
- In office 2 September 1935 – 24 June 1937
- Prime Minister: Hendrikus Colijn
- Preceded by: Henri Gelissen as Minister of Economic Affairs
- Succeeded by: Max Steenberghe

Minister of Defence
- In office 10 August 1929 – 2 September 1935
- Prime Minister: Charles Ruijs de Beerenbrouck (1929–1933); Hendrikus Colijn (1933–1935)
- Preceded by: Johan Lambooij
- Succeeded by: Hendrikus Colijn

Member of the House of Representatives
- In office 8 June 1937 – 1 April 1946
- In office 9 May 1933 – 26 May 1933
- In office 17 September 1918 – 12 August 1929

Personal details
- Born: Laurentius Nicolaas Deckers; 14 February 1883 Heeze, Netherlands
- Died: 1 January 1978 (aged 94) The Hague, Netherlands
- Party: Catholic People's Party (from 1945)
- Other political affiliations: Roman Catholic State Party (1926–1945); General League (1904–1926)
- Spouse: Petronella van Dijck (m. 1907; died 1951)
- Education: Catholic University of Leuven (Bachelor of Science in Agriculture, Master of Science in Engineering, Doctor of Philosophy); Leiden University (Bachelor of Laws, Master of Laws)
- Occupation: Politician · Diplomat · civil servant · Agronomist · Jurist · Researcher · Businessman · Corporate director · Nonprofit director · Trade association executive · professor

Laurentius Nicolaas Deckers (14 February 1883 – 1 January 1978) was a Dutch politician and diplomat of the Roman Catholic State Party (RKSP) and later co-founder of the Catholic People's Party (KVP) and agronomist.

== Political career ==
Deckers was elected to the House of Representatives in the 1918 general election, taking office on 17 September 1918. After the 1929 general election Deckers was appointed as Minister of Defence in the Ruijs de Beerenbrouck III cabinet, taking office on 10 August 1929. After the 1933 general election Deckers returned to the House of Representatives, taking office on 9 May 1933. Following the cabinet formation of 1933 Deckers continued as Minister of Defence in the Colijn II cabinet, taking office on 26 May 1933. The cabinet fell on 23 July 1935 and continued to serve in a demissionary capacity until the cabinet formation of 1935 when it was replaced by Colijn III cabinet with Deckers remaining as Minister of Defence, taking office on 31 July 1935. Deckers was appointed as Minister of Agriculture and Fisheries after the Ministry of Economic Affairs was split into the Ministry of Commerce, Industry and Shipping and the Ministry of Agriculture and Fisheries, taking office on 2 September 1935. After the 1937 general election Deckers again returned to the House of Representatives, taking office on 8 June 1937. Following the cabinet formation of 1937 Deckers was not giving a cabinet post in the new cabinet; the Colijn III cabinet was replaced by the Colijn IV cabinet on 24 June 1937 and he continued to serve in the House of Representatives as a frontbencher. Deckers was selected as party leader and parliamentary leader of the Roman Catholic State Party in the House of Representatives following the election of Josef van Schaik as a Speaker of the House of Representatives, taking office on 11 November 1937.

On 10 May 1940 Nazi Germany invaded the Netherlands and the government fled to London to escape the German occupation. During World War II Deckers continued to serve in the House of Representatives but in reality the de facto political influence of the House of Representatives was marginalized. On 9 October 1940 Deckers was arrested and detained in Buchenwald concentration camp and was released on 7 November 1940. Deckers also served retroactively as chairman of the Roman Catholic State Party from 1 September 1941 after Timotheus Verschuur was detained in Sachsenhausen concentration camp and later died in captivity on 17 April 1945. In May 1942 Deckers was arrested and detained again in Buchenwald concentration camp and was released in August 1942. Following the end of World War II Queen Wilhelmina ordered a Recall of Parliament and Deckers remained a member of the House of Representatives, taking office on 20 November 1945. On 22 December 1945 the Roman Catholic State Party was renamed as the Catholic People's Party, Deckers was one of the co-founders and was selected as the first parliamentary leader of the Catholic People's Party in the House of Representatives.

In March 1946 Deckers was nominated as member of the Council of State, he resigned as parliamentary leader and as member of the House of Representatives the day he was installed as a member of the Council of State, serving from 1 April 1946 until 1 March 1958.

== Decorations ==
Honours
Ribbon bar	Honour	Country	Date	Comment
	Grand Officer of the Order of the Crown	Belgium	10 February 1935	
	Grand Officer of the Order of Orange-Nassau	Netherlands	30 July 1937	Elevated from Officer (1 May 1928)
	Grand Cross of the Order of the Oak Crown	Luxembourg	18 June 1946	
	Knight Commander with Star of the Order of the Holy Sepulchre	Holy See	12 August 1948	
	Grand Officer of the Legion of Honour	France	5 February 1950	
	Grand Cross of the Order pro Merito Melitensi	Sovereign Military Order of Malta	1 January 1953	
	Knight Grand Cross of the Order of St. Gregory the Great	Holy See	8 March 1957	
	Commander of the Order of the Netherlands Lion	Netherlands	30 April 1959	Elevated from Knight (1 April 1946)

Party political offices
Preceded by Josef van Schaik	Leader of the Roman Catholic State Party; 1937–1945	Party succeeded by Catholic People's Party
Preceded by Josef van Schaik	Parliamentary leader of the Roman Catholic State Party in the House of Representatives; 1937–1945	Party succeeded by Catholic People's Party
Preceded by Timotheus Verschuur	Chairman of the Roman Catholic State Party; 1941–1945	Party succeeded by Catholic People's Party
New political party	Parliamentary leader of the Catholic People's Party in the House of Representatives; 1945–1946	Succeeded by Frans Teulings
Political offices
Preceded by Johan Lambooij	Minister of Defence; 1929–1935	Succeeded by Hendrikus Colijn
Preceded by Henri Gelissen as Minister of Economic Affairs	Minister of Agriculture and Fisheries; 1935–1937	Succeeded by Max Steenberghe
Records
Preceded by Charles Welter	Oldest living former cabinet member 28 March 1972 – 1 January 1978	Succeeded by Willem Drees
