= Dolf Joekes =

Dutch politician and diplomat

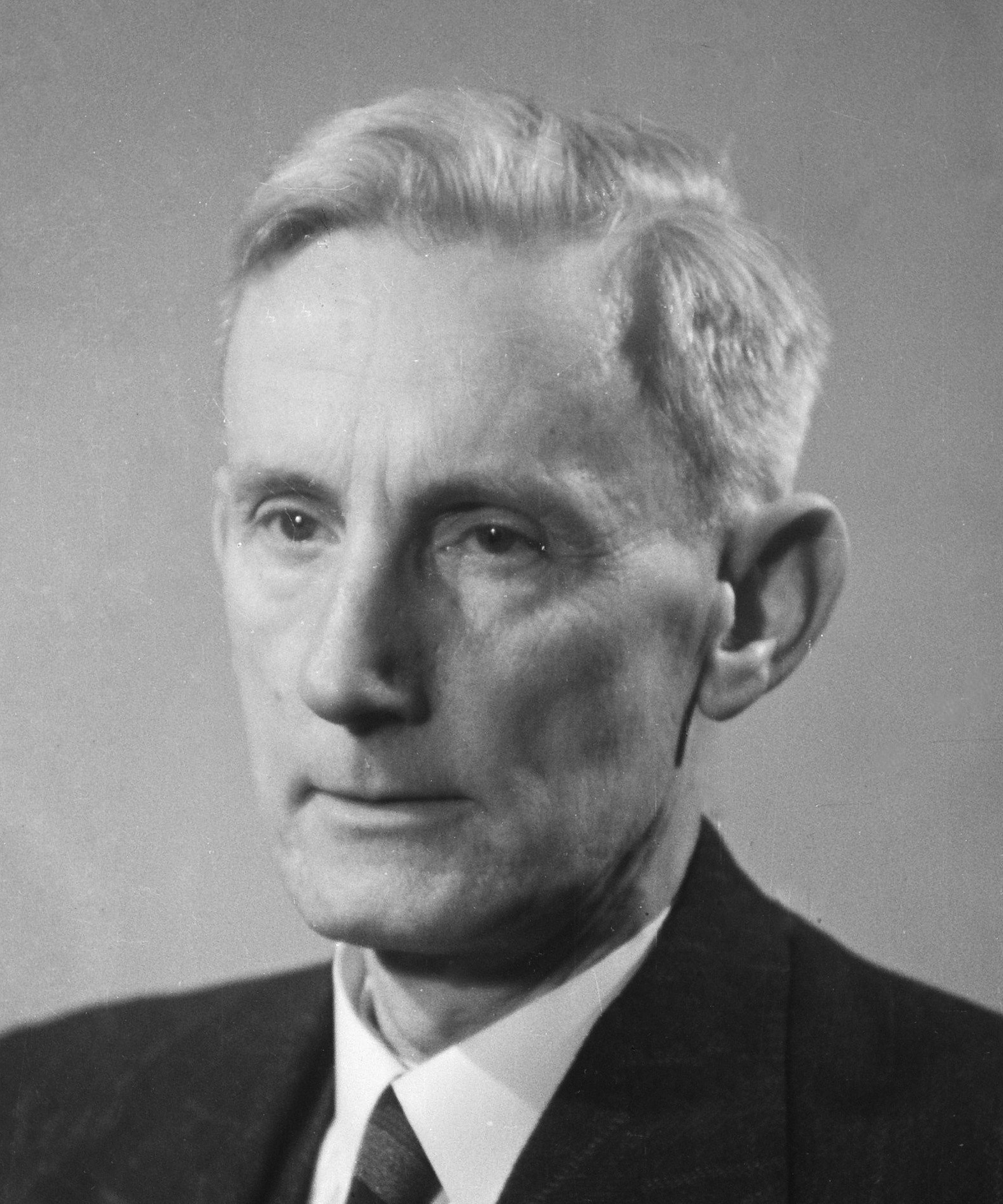
- Dolf Joekes in 1946

Member of the Council of State
- In office 1 November 1952 – 1 June 1960
- Vice President: See list: Frans Beelaerts van Blokland (1952–1956) Bram Rutgers (1956–1959) Louis Beel (1959–1960)

Minister of Social Affairs and Health
- In office 15 September 1951 – 2 September 1952
- Prime Minister: Willem Drees
- Preceded by: Himself as Minister of Social Affairs
- Succeeded by: Ko Suurhoff

Minister of Social Affairs
- In office 7 August 1948 – 15 September 1951
- Prime Minister: Willem Drees
- Preceded by: Willem Drees
- Succeeded by: Himself as Minister of Social Affairs and Health

Chairman of the Free-thinking Democratic League
- In office 9 May 1941 – 13 April 1943
- Preceded by: Marcus Slingenberg
- Succeeded by: Jan Schilthuis

Parliamentary leader of the Free-thinking Democratic League in the House of Representatives
- In office 15 October 1938 – 9 February 1946
- Preceded by: Pieter Oud
- Succeeded by: Office discontinued
- In office 1 June 1933 – 20 September 1937
- Preceded by: Henri Marchant
- Succeeded by: Pieter Oud

Member of the House of Representatives
- In office 23 July 1952 – 1 November 1952
- In office 15 September 1925 – 7 August 1948

Personal details
- Born: Adolf Marcus Joekes; 5 May 1885 Buo, Tanah Datar, Dutch East Indies
- Died: 1 April 1962 (aged 76) The Hague, Netherlands
- Party: Labour Party (from 1946)
- Other political affiliations: Free-thinking Democratic League (until 1946)
- Spouse: Elsje van Wulfften Palthe (m. 1911)
- Children: Dolf Joekes Jr. (1912); Willemine Joekes (1913); Willem Joekes (1916); Theo Joekes (1923–1999)
- Education: Leiden University (Bachelor of Laws, Master of Laws, Doctor of Philosophy)
- Occupation: Politician · Diplomat · Civil servant · Jurist · Businessman · Corporate director · Salesman · Editor · Author

Adolf Marcus "Dolf" Joekes (5 May 1885 – 1 April 1962) was a Dutch politician and diplomat of the Free-thinking Democratic League (VDB) and later co-founder of the Labour Party (PvdA) and businessman.

== Early life and career ==
Joekes worked as a salesman for the Samarang–Joana Steam Tram Company and the Semarang-Cheribon Steam Tram Company in Batavia in the Dutch East Indies from 1910 until 1918 and a corporate director for the Dutch East Indies Railway Company from 1918 until 1920. Joekes worked as a civil servant for the Ministry of Labour as Director-General of the department for International Labour Laws, taking office on 18 May 1920.

== Political career ==
Joekes was elected to the House of Representatives in the 1925 general election, taking office on 15 September 1925. Joekes also worked as a managing editor of the party newspaper De Vrijzinnig-Democraat from 10 December 1925 until 1 May 1941. After the 1933 general election the parliamentary leader of the Free-thinking Democratic League in the House of Representatives Henri Marchant was appointed as Minister of Education, Arts and Sciences in the Colijn II cabinet and selected Joekes as his successor, taking office on 1 June 1933. Following the 1937 general election, Pieter Oud returned to the House of Representatives but asked Joekes to remain as parliamentary leader until 20 September 1937. In October 1938 Pieter Oud was nominated as Mayor of Rotterdam and he announced he was stepping down as parliamentary leader and endorsed Joekes as his successor. Pieter Oud resigned on 15 October 1938 with Joekes installed the same day. During World War II Joekes continued to serve as a member of House of Representatives but in reality the political influence of the House of Representative was marginalized. Joekes also served as chairman of the Free-thinking Democratic League from 9 May 1941 until 13 April 1943 following the death of Marcus Slingenberg. In May 1942 Joekes was arrested and detained in Kamp Sint-Michielsgestel and was released in December 1942. In April 1943 Joekes was again arrested and was detained in the ilags of Scheveningen, Vught and Haaren. In August 1943 Joekes was transferred to the Buchenwald concentration camp and was detained until its liberation on 4 April 1945.

Following the end of World War II, Queen Wilhelmina ordered a Recall of Parliament and Joekes remained in the House of Representatives. On 9 February 1946 the Free-thinking Democratic League (VDB), the Social Democratic Workers' Party (SDAP) and the Christian Democratic Union (CDU) chose to merge to form the Labour Party (PvdA). Joekes was one of the co-founders. For the 1946 and 1948 general elections Joekes was one of the lead candidates of the Labour Party. After the 1948 general election a cabinet formation resulted in a coalition agreement between the Labour Party, the Catholic People's Party (KVP), the Christian Historical Union (CHU) and the People's Party for Freedom and Democracy (VVD) which formed the Drees–Van Schaik cabinet with Jokes appointed as Minister of Social Affairs, taking office on 7 August 1948. The cabinet fell on 24 January 1951 and was replaced by the Drees I cabinet with Joekes continuing as Minister of Social Affairs, taking office on 15 March 1951. On 15 September 1951 the Ministry of Social Affairs was renamed as the Ministry of Social Affairs and Health. Following the election of 1952 Joekes returned as a Member of the House of Representatives on 23 July 1952. Per his request Joekes was not considered for ministerial post in the new cabinet; the Drees I cabinet was replaced by the Drees I cabinet on 2 September 1952. In October 1952 Joekes was nominated as a Member of the Council of State, serving from 1 November 1952 until 1 June 1960.

== Decorations ==
Honours
Ribbon bar	Honour	Country	Date	Comment
	Knight of the Order of the Netherlands Lion	Netherlands	1 February 1946	
	Grand Cross of the Order of Leopold II	Belgium	24 December 1948	
	Grand Officer of the Order of the Oak Crown	Luxembourg	5 October 1950	
	Commander of the Order of Orange-Nassau	Netherlands	30 September 1952	

Party political offices
Preceded by Henri Marchant	Parliamentary leader of the Free-thinking Democratic League in the House of Representatives; 1933–1937	Succeeded by Pieter Oud
Preceded by Pieter Oud	Parliamentary leader of the Free-thinking Democratic League in the House of Representatives; 1938–1946	Party merged into the Labour Party
Preceded by Marcus Slingenberg	Chairman of the Free-thinking; Democratic League; 1941–1943	Succeeded by Jan Schilthuis
Political offices
Preceded by Willem Drees	Minister of Social Affairs; 1948–1951	Succeeded by Himself as Minister of Social; Affairs and Health
Preceded by Himself as Minister of Social Affairs	Minister of Social Affairs and Health; 1951–1952	Succeeded by Ko Suurhoff
Civic offices
New office	Director-General of the Department for International; Labour Laws of the Ministry of Labour; 1920–1925	Unknown
