= Jan Rudolph Slotemaker de Bruïne =

Dutch politician

The Reverend Jan Rudolph Slotemaker de Bruïne
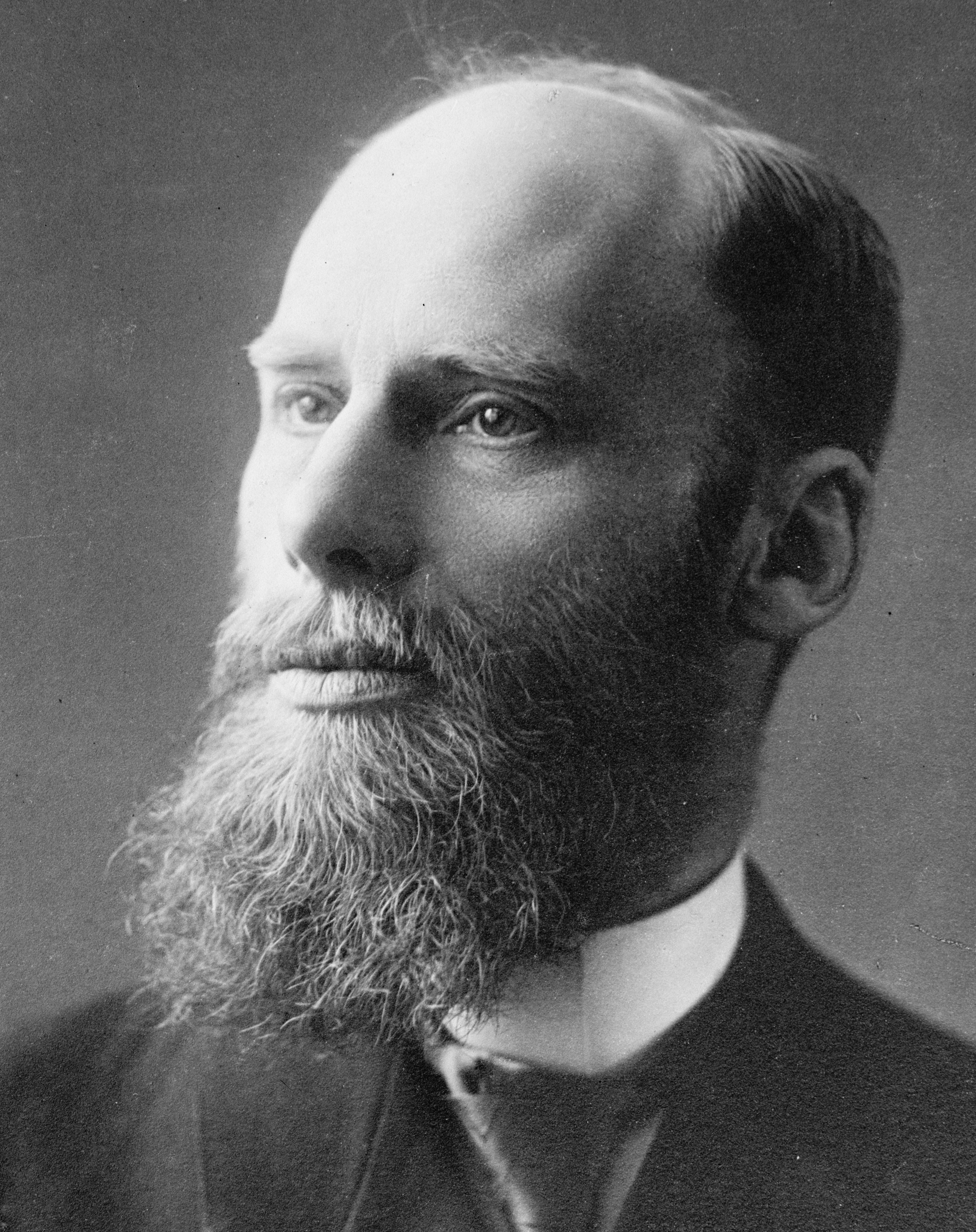
- Slotemaker de Bruïne in 1920

Minister of Education, Arts and Sciences
- In office 18 May 1935 – 25 July 1939
- Prime Minister: Hendrikus Colijn
- Preceded by: Henri Marchant
- Succeeded by: Bep Schrieke

Minister of Social Affairs
- In office 8 June 1933 – 31 July 1935
- Prime Minister: Hendrikus Colijn
- Preceded by: Timotheus Verschuur as Minister of Economic Affairs and Labour
- Succeeded by: Marcus Slingenberg

Member of the House of Representatives
- In office 4 September 1939 – 1 May 1941
- In office 8 June 1937 – 24 June 1937
- In office 17 September 1929 – 12 June 1933

Minister of Labour, Commerce and Industry
- In office 8 March 1926 – 10 August 1929
- Prime Minister: Dirk Jan de Geer
- Preceded by: Dionysius Koolen
- Succeeded by: Timotheus Verschuur

Chairman of the Christian Historical Union
- In office 5 January 1932 – 30 June 1933
- Leader: Dirk Jan de Geer
- Preceded by: Jan Schokking
- Succeeded by: Dirk Jan de Geer
- In office 15 April 1925 – 20 September 1926
- Leader: Johannes Theodoor de Visser
- Preceded by: Jan Schokking
- Succeeded by: Jan Schokking

Member of the Senate
- In office 25 July 1922 – 8 March 1926

Personal details
- Born: Jan Rudolph Slotemaker; 6 May 1869 Sliedrecht, Netherlands
- Died: 1 May 1941 (aged 71) Wassenaar, Netherlands
- Party: Christian Historical Union (from 1917)
- Spouse: Cornelia de Jong (m. 1894)
- Children: 4 daughters and 3 sons, including Gerard Slotemaker de Bruïne
- Education: Utrecht University
- Occupation: Politician · Theologian · Minister · Editor

Jan Rudolph Slotemaker de Bruïne (6 May 1869 – 1 May 1941) was a Dutch theologian and politician of the Christian Historical Union (CHU). He served as Minister of Labour, Commerce and Industry between 1926 and 1929, as Minister of Social Affairs between 1933 and 1935, and as Minister of Education, Arts and Sciences between 1935 and 1939.

== Early life and education ==
Jan Rudolph Slotemaker was born in Sliedrecht on 6 May 1869. His father, Nicolaas Ahasverus Cornelis Slotemaker, was a soliciter and had served as mayor of Molenaarsgraaf, Bleskensgraaf en Hofwegen and Wijngaarden. His mother, Hendrika Gerardina de Bruine, was originally from Friesland. "De Bruine" was added to his surname in 1889. Jan Rudolph attended lower education in his place of birth and gymnasium in Haarlem. He subsequently started studying Theology at Utrecht University in June 1889, and completed his study in July 1894 with a dissertation entitled De eschatologische voorstellingen in I en II Corinthe. He later got a doctorate as a Doctor of Theology in June 1896 and a Doctor of Philosophy in July 1898.

== Ministry and academic career ==
Slotemaker de Bruïne started working as a minister of the Dutch Reformed Church in August 1894. He chose Haulerwijk in rural Friesland as his first congregation due to what he perceived as "religious decline and social disarray" in the area. His experience with social injustice and the rise of socialism led him to believe that the church should not remain aloof with respect to the social question. During his ministry in Haulerwijk, which lasted until May 1897, Slotemaker de Bruïne managed to reawaken interest in religion among the local impoverished population, and he quickly gained a reputation as a devoted minister and a gifted orator. This led to requests from across the country, and Slotemaker de Bruïne subsequently served as a minister in Beilen from May 1897 until January 1900, in Middelburg from January 1900 until September 1903, in Nijmegen from September 1903 until December 1907, and in Utrecht from December 1907 until March 1916.

From 1895 on, Slotemaker de Bruïne wrote articles and brochures about ecclesiastic and social affairs. He expressed his support for a presbyterian polity in which each neighbourhood would have its own minister and church council, and sought to put this concept into practice during his ministry in Utrecht. Regarding the social question, Slotemaker de Bruïne believed that social misery was caused not just by changes in the means of production, but also by the receding of Christian norms and the dominance of an extreme liberalism encouraging limitless competition. He argued for the integration of the industrial working class into society through a labour movement and trade unions.

Slotemaker de Bruïne also worked as editor of the newspaper De Voorzorg from April 1903 until November 1921 and was co-founder and editor-in-chief of Christian magazine Stemmen des Tijds from January 1911 until May 1941. He worked as a professor of Theology and the History of Christianity and at Utrecht University from March 1916 until April 1925. Slotemaker de Bruïne also worked as editor-in-chief of the party newspaper De Nederlander from February 1921 until May 1941.

== Political career ==
=== Early political involvement (1917–1926) ===
Slotemaker de Bruïne had initially not involved himself in politics and had abstained from voting, believing that a partisan preacher could not enjoy the confidence of his entire congregation. He deemed religious conviction unsuitable as the guiding principle of partisan politics, and opposed Abraham Kuyper's antithesis strategy. In a 1913 lecture for students of a debating club in Utrecht, he spoke of the dangers of the connection between Christianity and partisan politics. Intended as an academic-theoretical discourse, many voters took it as practical advice, and the confessional Coalition's defeat in the 1913 general election was occasionally attributed to his lecture.

In 1917, however, he joined the Christian Historical Union (CHU), and he served in the Provincial Council of Utrecht from 1919 until 1922. In 1922, he was elected to the Senate by the Provincial Council of Zeeland, receiving 23 votes out of 41. He defeated the liberal J.N. Elenbaas, who received 11 votes. He took office on 25 July 1922. In the 1923 Senate election, after a reform of the electoral system for the Senate, he was re-elected as the sole Christian Historical senator in electoral group I, comprising Zeeland, North Brabant, Utrecht and Limburg. In the Senate, Slotemaker de Bruïne mostly spoke about issues relating to labour affairs, economic affairs and suffrage. As a proponent of women's suffrage, he supported Frida Katz' candidacy for the House of Representatives. On 15 April 1925, he became chairman of the CHU, and would keep that position until 20 September 1926.

=== First ministership and parliamentary term (1926–1933) ===
On 8 March 1926, Slotemaker de Bruïne was appointed Minister of Labour, Commerce and Industry in the De Geer I cabinet. In 1928, along with interior minister Jan Kan, he brought about the Opium Act, which implemented international conventions against opium abuse and other forms of substance abuse. The following year, he implemented the Sickness Act, which had been brought about earlier. Other legislative achievements include the Act on Infectious Diseases and the Medical Disciplinary Act. Slotemaker de Bruïne left office upon the resignation of the cabinet on 10 August 1929.

He was elected to the House of Representatives in the 1929 general election, taking office on 17 September 1929. In the House, he concerned himself with economic affairs, labour and public health. In 1930, he was one of four Christian Historical MPs to vote in favour of the Lease Act, while in 1933, he was one of just two to vote against the bill regarding blasphemy. He also served again as chairman of the CHU from 5 January 1932 until 30 June 1933. Slotemaker de Bruïne was re-elected in the 1933 general election as the second-placed candidate on the CHU's candidate list.

=== Second ministership (1933–1939) ===
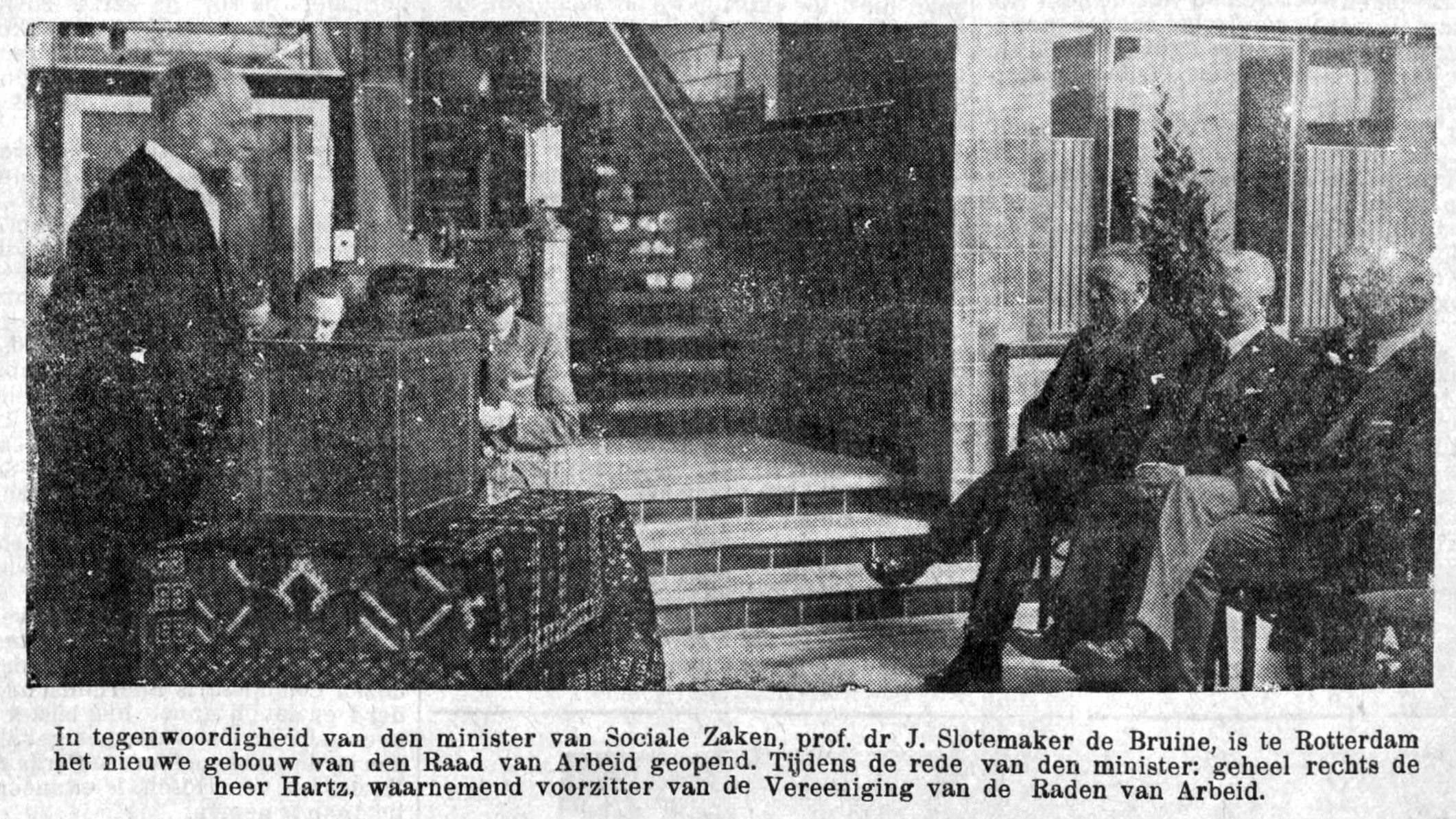
Slotemaker de Bruïne at the opening of a new Labour Council building in Rotterdam, 1934

On 12 June 1933, however, he returned to the government as Minister of Social Affairs in the Colijn II cabinet. On 18 May 1935, following the resignation of Henri Marchant, Slotemaker de Bruïne succeeded him as acting Minister of Education, Arts and Sciences. Upon the installation of the Colijn III cabinet on 31 July 1935, he left office as Minister of Economic Affairs and took on the Education, Arts and Sciences portfolio permanently. Slotemaker de Bruïne's second ministership was of little significance, both because the Great Depression led the government to pursue austerity which inhibited an expansive policy on social affairs or education, and because he turned out to be more suitable to preaching than to the responsibilities of a minister, particularly the technical and financial aspects of legislation. For this reason, he was not offered a position in the Colijn V cabinet, and left office upon its installation on 25 July 1939.

As social affairs minister, Slotemaker de Bruïne provided financial aid to the National Crisis Committee, which aided the unemployed, but also reduced direct support for the unemployed by 10%. His 1933 Domestic Work Act introduced mandatory registration of domestic workers, and regulated their working conditions. He was also responsible for the passing of the Rijksverzekeringsbank Act in the same year, which had been prepared by his predecessor Timotheus Verschuur. This act brought social insurances fully under the responsibility of the Rijksverzekeringsbank. In 1934, he brought about an amendment to the 1895 Safety Act, also prepared by Verschuur, introducing safety standards for agriculture and inland shipping, among other sectors.

As education minister, he sought to achieve budget cuts by consolidating special (Christian) elementary schools in 1935, but the confessional majority in the House of Representatives opposed this plan; another austerity measure was that women teachers would be dismissed upon marriage unless they were their household's main breadwinner, had been in service for at least ten years, or were deemed invaluable to the school's education. A 1937 amendment to the 1920 Lower Education Act mandated the institution of parents' councils in public schools, allowed for the institution of municipal parents' councils, and allowed for education in regional languages, including West Frisian. In 1939, he also introduced a bill for preparatory higher and middle education, but this bill remained pending until it was withdrawn in 1946.

=== Later life (1939–1941) ===
Slotemaker de Bruïne returned to the House of Representatives on 4 September 1939, and served as his party's spokesperson on colonial affairs. After the outbreak of World War II and the German invasion of the Netherlands, he initially took a conciliatory approach to the German occupiers. This changed in November 1940, however, as measures targeting Jews intensified. Shortly hereafter, he withdrew from public life because of ill health. After a lengthy struggle with his health, he died in Wassenaar on 1 May 1941, at the age of 71.

== Private life ==
Slotemaker de Bruïne married Cornelia de Jong on 23 August 1894, and the couple had three sons and four daughters. Their son Gerard Slotemaker de Bruïne, born in 1899, was a resistance fighter during World War II, and briefly served as a member of the House of Representatives for the Pacifist Socialist Party in the 1960s.

== Decorations ==
Honours
Ribbon bar	Honour	Country	Date	Comment
	Knight of the Order of the Netherlands Lion	Netherlands	31 August 1921	
	Grand Cross of the Order of the White Lion	Czechoslovakia	29 April 1937	
	Grand Officer of the Order of Orange-Nassau	Netherlands	30 July 1939	Elevated from Commander (5 September 1929)

Party political offices
Preceded by Jan Schokking	Chairman of the Christian; Historical Union; 1925–1926	Succeeded by Jan Schokking
Preceded by Jan Schokking	Chairman of the Christian; Historical Union; 1932–1933	Succeeded by Dirk Jan de Geer
Political offices
Preceded by Dionysius Koolen	Minister of Labour, Commerce and Industry; 1926–1929	Succeeded by Timotheus Verschuur
Preceded by Timotheus Verschuur as Minister of Economic; Affairs and Labour	Minister of Social Affairs; 1933–1935	Succeeded by Marcus Slingenberg
Preceded by Henri Marchant	Minister of Education, Arts and Sciences; 1935–1939	Succeeded by Bep Schrieke
