= List of ministers of finance of the Netherlands =

Minister of Finance of the Netherlands
- Minister van Financiën
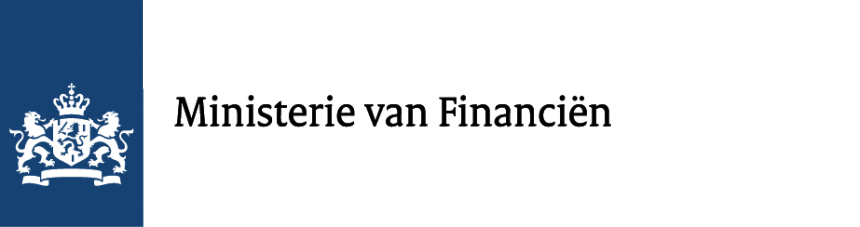
- Ministry of Finance

- Flag of the Kingdom of the Netherlands
- Incumbent; Eelco Heinen since 2 July 2024
- Ministry of Finance
- Style: His/Her Excellency
- Member of: Council of Ministers
- Appointer: The monarch on advice of the prime minister
- Formation: 22 January 1978; 48 years ago
- First holder: Alexander Gogel (as Secretary of Finance)
- Salary: €205,991 (As of 2025)
- Website: Minister of Finance

The minister of finance (Dutch: Minister van Financiën) is the head of the Ministry of Finance and a member of the Cabinet of the Netherlands. The current minister of finance is Eelco Heinen of the People's Party for Freedom and Democracy, who has been in office since 2 July 2024.

== List of ministers of finance (since 1866) ==
Portrait	Name (Birth–Death)	Term of office	Party	Cabinet
	Count; Rutger Schimmelpenninck van Nijenhuis (1821–1893)	1 June 1866 – 4 June 1868	Independent (Conservative)	Van Zuylen van Nijevelt
Pieter Philip van Bosse	Pieter Philip van Bosse (1809–1879)	4 June 1868 – 4 January 1871	Independent (Liberal)	Van Bosse–Fock
	Pieter Blussé van Oud-Alblas (1812–1887)	4 January 1871 – 6 July 1872	Independent (Liberal)	Thorbecke III
Albert van Delden	Albert van Delden (1828–1898)	6 July 1872 – 27 August 1874	Independent (Liberal)	De Vries– Fransen van de Putte
	Jonkheer; Hendrik van der Heim (1824–1890)	27 August 1874 – 3 November 1877	Independent (Conservative)	Heemskerk–Van Lynden van Sandenburg
Johan Gleichman	Johan Gleichman (1834–1906)	3 November 1877 – 20 August 1879	Independent (Liberal)	Kappeyne van de Coppello
Simon Vissering	Dr. Simon Vissering (1818–1888)	20 August 1879 – 13 June 1881; Resigned	Independent (Liberal)	Van Lynden van Sandenburg
Theo van Lynden van Sandenburg	Count; Theo van Lynden van Sandenburg (1826–1885)	13 June 1881 – 23 April 1883	Independent (Protestant Conservative)	Van Lynden van Sandenburg
	Willem Grobbée (1822–1907)	23 April 1883 – 4 May 1885; Resigned	Independent (Conservative)	J. Heemskerk
Jacobus Bloem	Jacobus Bloem (1822–1902)	4 May 1885 – 21 April 1888	Independent (Conservative)	J. Heemskerk
Karel Antonie Godin de Beaufort	Jonkheer; Karel Antonie Godin de Beaufort (1850–1921)	21 April 1888 – 21 August 1891	Anti-Revolutionary Party	Mackay
Nicolaas Pierson	Nicolaas Pierson (1839–1909)	21 August 1891 – 9 May 1894	Liberal Union	Van Tienhoven
Jacobus Sprenger van Eyk	Jacobus Sprenger van Eyk (1842–1907)	9 May 1894 – 26 July 1897	Independent (Conservative Liberal)	Röell
Nicolaas Pierson	Nicolaas Pierson (1839–1909)	26 July 1897 – 1 August 1901	Liberal Union	Pierson
Jan Harte van Tecklenburg	Jan Harte van Tecklenburg (1853–1937)	1 August 1901 – 17 August 1905	Independent (Catholic)	Kuyper
Theo de Meester	Theo de Meester (1851–1919)	17 August 1905 – 12 February 1908	Liberal Union	De Meester
Maximilien Kolkman	Maximilien Kolkman (1853–1924)	12 February 1908 – 29 August 1913	Independent (Catholic)	T. Heemskerk
Anthonij Bertling	Anthonij Bertling (1860–1945)	29 August 1913 – 24 October 1914; Resigned	Independent (Liberal)	Cort van der Linden
Willem Treub	Willem Treub (1858–1931)	24 October 1914 – 8 February 1916; Resigned	Free-thinking; Democratic League	Cort van der Linden
Willem Treub	Willem Treub (1858–1931)	24 October 1914 – 8 February 1916; Resigned	Independent (Liberal)	Cort van der Linden
Anton van Gijn	Dr. Anton van Gijn (1866–1933)	8 February 1916 – 22 February 1917; Resigned	Liberal Union	Cort van der Linden
Willem Treub	Willem Treub (1858–1931)	22 February 1917 – 9 September 1918	Independent (Liberal)	Cort van der Linden
Willem Treub	Willem Treub (1858–1931)	22 February 1917 – 9 September 1918	Economic League	Cort van der Linden
	Simon de Vries (1869–1961)	9 September 1918 – 28 July 1921; Resigned	Anti-Revolutionary Party	Ruijs de Beerenbrouck I
Dirk Jan de Geer	Jonkheer; Dirk Jan de Geer (1870–1969)	28 July 1921 – 11 August 1923; Resigned	Christian Historical Union	Ruijs de Beerenbrouck I
Dirk Jan de Geer	Jonkheer; Dirk Jan de Geer (1870–1969)	28 July 1921 – 11 August 1923; Resigned	Christian Historical Union	Ruijs de Beerenbrouck II
Hendrikus Colijn	Hendrikus Colijn (1869–1944)	11 August 1923 – 8 March 1926	Anti-Revolutionary Party	Ruijs de Beerenbrouck II
Hendrikus Colijn	Hendrikus Colijn (1869–1944)	11 August 1923 – 8 March 1926	Anti-Revolutionary Party	Colijn I
Dirk Jan de Geer	Jonkheer; Dirk Jan de Geer (1870–1969)	8 March 1926 – 26 May 1933	Christian Historical Union	De Geer I
Dirk Jan de Geer	Jonkheer; Dirk Jan de Geer (1870–1969)	8 March 1926 – 26 May 1933	Christian Historical Union	Ruijs de Beerenbrouck III
Pieter Oud	Pieter Oud (1886–1968)	26 May 1933 – 24 June 1937	Free-thinking; Democratic League	Colijn II • III
Jacob Adriaan de Wilde	Jacob Adriaan de Wilde (1879–1956)	24 June 1937 – 19 May 1939; Resigned	Anti-Revolutionary Party	Colijn IV
Hendrikus Colijn	Dr. Hendrikus Colijn (1869–1944)	19 May 1939 – 25 July 1939; Ad interim	Anti-Revolutionary Party	Colijn IV
Christiaan Bodenhausen	Christiaan Bodenhausen (1869–1966)	25 July 1939 – 10 August 1939	Independent (Liberal)	Colijn V
Dirk Jan de Geer	Jonkheer; Dirk Jan de Geer (1870–1969)	10 August 1939 – 3 September 1940	Christian Historical Union	De Geer II
Charles Welter	Charles Welter (1880–1972)	3 September 1940 – 27 July 1941	Roman Catholic; State Party	Gerbrandy I
Max Steenberghe	Max Steenberghe (1899–1972)	27 July 1941 – 17 November 1941; Resigned	Roman Catholic; State Party	Gerbrandy II
Willem Albarda	Willem Albarda (1877–1957)	17 November 1941 – 9 December 1942	Social Democratic; Workers' Party	Gerbrandy II
Johan van den Broek	Johan van den Broek (1882–1946)	9 December 1942 – 23 February 1945	Independent Liberal	Gerbrandy II
Gerard Huysmans	Dr. Gerard Huysmans (1904–1948)	23 February 1945 – 25 June 1945	Roman Catholic; State Party	Gerbrandy III
Piet Lieftinck	Dr. Piet Lieftinck (1902–1989)	25 June 1945 – 1 July 1952; Resigned	Christian Historical Union	Schermerhorn–Drees
Piet Lieftinck	Dr. Piet Lieftinck (1902–1989)	25 June 1945 – 1 July 1952; Resigned	Labour Party	Beel I
Piet Lieftinck	Dr. Piet Lieftinck (1902–1989)	25 June 1945 – 1 July 1952; Resigned	Labour Party	Drees–Van Schaik
Piet Lieftinck	Dr. Piet Lieftinck (1902–1989)	25 June 1945 – 1 July 1952; Resigned	Labour Party	Drees I
Willem Drees	Dr. Willem Drees (1886–1988)	1 July 1952 – 2 September 1952; Acting	Labour Party	Drees I
Jo van de Kieft	Jo van de Kieft (1884–1970)	2 September 1952 – 13 October 1956	Labour Party	Drees II
Henk Hofstra	Henk Hofstra (1904–1999)	13 October 1956 – 22 December 1958	Labour Party	Drees III
Jelle Zijlstra	Dr. Jelle Zijlstra (1918–2001)	22 December 1958 – 24 July 1963	Anti-Revolutionary Party	Beel II
Jelle Zijlstra	Dr. Jelle Zijlstra (1918–2001)	22 December 1958 – 24 July 1963	Anti-Revolutionary Party	De Quay
Johan Witteveen	Dr. Johan Witteveen (1921–2019)	24 July 1963 – 14 April 1965	People's Party for Freedom and Democracy	Marijnen
Anne Vondeling	Dr. Anne Vondeling (1916–1979)	14 April 1965 – 22 November 1966; Resigned	Labour Party	Cals
Jelle Zijlstra	Dr. Jelle Zijlstra (1918–2001)	22 November 1966 – 5 April 1967	Anti-Revolutionary Party	Zijlstra
Johan Witteveen	Dr. Johan Witteveen (1921–2019)	5 April 1967 – 6 July 1971	People's Party for Freedom and Democracy	De Jong
Roelof Nelissen	Roelof Nelissen (1931–2019)	6 July 1971 – 11 May 1973	Catholic; People's Party	Biesheuvel I • II
Wim Duisenberg	Dr. Wim Duisenberg (1935–2005)	11 May 1973 – 19 December 1977	Labour Party	Den Uyl
Frans Andriessen	Frans Andriessen (1929–2019)	19 December 1977 – 22 February 1980; Resigned	Catholic; People's Party	Van Agt I
Gijs van Aardenne	Gijs van Aardenne (1930–1995)	22 February 1980 – 5 March 1980; Ad Interim	People's Party for Freedom and Democracy	Van Agt I
Fons van der Stee	Fons van der Stee (1928–1999)	5 March 1980 – 4 November 1982	Catholic; People's Party	Van Agt I
Fons van der Stee	Fons van der Stee (1928–1999)	5 March 1980 – 4 November 1982	Christian; Democratic Appeal	Van Agt II • III
Onno Ruding	Dr. Onno Ruding (born 1939)	4 November 1982 – 7 November 1989	Christian; Democratic Appeal	Lubbers I • II
Wim Kok	Wim Kok (1938–2018)	7 November 1989 – 22 August 1994	Labour Party	Lubbers III
Gerrit Zalm	Gerrit Zalm (born 1952)	22 August 1994 – 4 June 1996^{[Note]}	People's Party for Freedom and Democracy	Kok I
Hans Wijers	Dr. Hans Wijers (born 1951)	4 June 1996 – 26 June 1996; Acting	Democrats 66	Kok I
Gerrit Zalm	Gerrit Zalm (born 1952)	26 June 1996 – 22 July 2002	People's Party for Freedom and Democracy	Kok I
Gerrit Zalm	Gerrit Zalm (born 1952)	26 June 1996 – 22 July 2002	People's Party for Freedom and Democracy	Kok II
Hans Hoogervorst	Hans Hoogervorst (born 1956)	22 July 2002 – 27 May 2003	People's Party for Freedom and Democracy	Balkenende I
Gerrit Zalm	Gerrit Zalm (born 1952)	27 May 2003 – 22 February 2007	People's Party for Freedom and Democracy	Balkenende II • III
Wouter Bos	Wouter Bos (born 1963)	22 February 2007 – 23 February 2010; Resigned	Labour Party	Balkenende IV
Jan Kees de Jager	Jan Kees de Jager (born 1969)	23 February 2010 – 5 November 2012	Christian; Democratic Appeal	Balkenende IV
Jan Kees de Jager	Jan Kees de Jager (born 1969)	23 February 2010 – 5 November 2012	Christian; Democratic Appeal	Mark Rutte (Rutte I)
Jeroen Dijsselbloem	Jeroen; Dijsselbloem (born 1966)	5 November 2012 – 26 October 2017	Labour Party	Rutte II
Wopke Hoekstra	Wopke Hoekstra (born 1975)	26 October 2017 – 10 January 2022	Christian; Democratic Appeal	Rutte III
Sigrid Kaag	Sigrid Kaag (born 1961)	10 January 2022 – 8 January 2024	Democrats 66	Rutte IV
Rob Jetten	Rob Jetten (born 1987)	8 January 2024 – 12 January 2024; Acting	Democrats 66	Rutte IV
Steven van Weyenberg	Steven van Weyenberg (born 1973)	12 January 2024 – 2 July 2024	Democrats 66	Rutte IV
Eelco Heinen	Eelco Heinen (born 1981)	2 July 2024 – Incumbent	People's Party for Freedom and Democracy	Schoof
Eelco Heinen	Eelco Heinen (born 1981)	2 July 2024 – Incumbent	People's Party for Freedom and Democracy	Jetten

^{Medical leave of absence from 4 June 1996 until 26 June 1996}

== List of state secretaries for finance ==
Portrait	Name (Birth–Death)	Portfolio	Term of office	Party	Cabinet
Wim van den Berge	Wim van den Berge (1905–1987)	• Fiscal Policy • Tax and Customs • Governmental; Budget	2 February 1953 – 13 October 1956	Independent	Drees II
Vacant
Wim van den Berge	Wim van den Berge (1905–1987)	• Fiscal Policy • Tax and Customs • Governmental; Budget	27 May 1959 – 14 April 1965	Independent	De Quay
Wim van den Berge	Wim van den Berge (1905–1987)	• Fiscal Policy • Tax and Customs • Governmental; Budget	27 May 1959 – 14 April 1965	Independent	Marijnen
Wiel Hoefnagels	Wiel Hoefnagels (1929–1978)	• Fiscal Policy • Tax and Customs • Governmental; Budget	31 May 1965 – 22 November 1966	Catholic People's Party	Cals
Vacant
Ferd Grapperhaus I	Ferd Grapperhaus I (1927–2010)	• Fiscal Policy • Tax and Customs • Governmental; Budget	10 May 1967 – 6 July 1971	Catholic People's Party	De Jong
Willem Scholten	Willem Scholten (1927–2005)	• Fiscal Policy • Tax and Customs	14 July 1971 – 19 March 1973; Resigned	Christian Historical Union	Biesheuvel I • II
Fons van der Stee	Fons van der Stee (1928–1999)	• Governmental; Budget	14 July 1971 – 12 March 1973; Resigned	Catholic People's Party	Biesheuvel I • II
Fons van der Stee	Fons van der Stee (1928–1999)	• Fiscal Policy • Tax and Customs	11 May 1973 – 1 November 1973^{[Appt]}	Catholic People's Party	Den Uyl
Martin van Rooijen	Martin van Rooijen (born 1942)	• Fiscal Policy • Tax and Customs	21 December 1973 – 14 October 1977; Resigned	Catholic People's Party	Den Uyl
Aar de Goede	Aar de Goede (1928–2016)	• Governmental; Budget	11 May 1973 – 19 December 1977	Democrats 66	Den Uyl
Ad Nooteboom	Ad Nooteboom (1928–2023)	• Fiscal Policy • Tax and Customs • Governmental; Budget	28 December 1977 – 22 February 1980; Resigned	Christian Historical Union	Van Agt I
Marius van Amelsvoort	Marius van Amelsvoort (1930–2006)	• Fiscal Policy • Tax and Customs • Governmental; Budget	16 April 1980 – 11 September 1981	Catholic People's Party	Van Agt I
Marius van Amelsvoort	Marius van Amelsvoort (1930–2006)	• Fiscal Policy • Tax and Customs • Governmental; Budget	16 April 1980 – 11 September 1981	Christian; Democratic Appeal	Van Agt I
Hans Kombrink	Hans Kombrink (born 1946)	• Fiscal Policy • Governmental; Budget	11 September 1981 – 29 May 1982; Resigned	Labour Party	Van Agt II
Vacant
Henk Koning	Henk Koning (1933–2016)	• Fiscal Policy • Tax and Customs • Governmental; Budget	4 November 1982 – 7 November 1989	People's Party for Freedom and Democracy	Lubbers I • II
Marius van Amelsvoort	Marius van Amelsvoort (1930–2006)	• Fiscal Policy • Tax and Customs • Governmental; Budget	7 November 1989 – 22 August 1994	Christian; Democratic Appeal	Lubbers III
Willem Vermeend	Willem Vermeend (born 1948)	• Fiscal Policy • Tax and Customs • Governmental; Budget	22 August 1994 – 24 March 2000^{[Appt]}	Labour Party	Kok I
Willem Vermeend	Willem Vermeend (born 1948)	• Fiscal Policy • Tax and Customs • Governmental; Budget	22 August 1994 – 24 March 2000^{[Appt]}	Labour Party	Kok II
Wouter Bos	Wouter Bos (born 1963)	• Fiscal Policy • Tax and Customs • Governmental; Budget	24 March 2000 – 22 July 2002	Labour Party	Kok II
Steven van Eijck	Steven van Eijck (born 1959)	• Fiscal Policy • Governmental; Budget	22 July 2002 – 27 May 2003	Pim Fortuyn List	Balkenende I
Joop Wijn	Joop Wijn (born 1969)	• Fiscal Policy • Tax and Customs • Governmental; Budget	27 May 2003 – 7 July 2006	Christian; Democratic Appeal	Balkenende II
Vacant
Jan Kees de Jager	Jan Kees de Jager (born 1969)	• Fiscal Policy • Tax and Customs • Governmental; Budget	22 February 2007 – 23 February 2010^{[Appt]}	Christian; Democratic Appeal	Balkenende IV
Frans Weekers	Frans Weekers (born 1967)	• Fiscal Policy • Tax and Customs • Governmental; Budget	14 October 2010 – 30 January 2014; Resigned	People's Party for Freedom and Democracy	Rutte I
Frans Weekers	Frans Weekers (born 1967)	• Fiscal Policy • Tax and Customs • Governmental; Budget	14 October 2010 – 30 January 2014; Resigned	People's Party for Freedom and Democracy	Rutte II
Eric Wiebes	Eric Wiebes (born 1963)	• Fiscal Policy • Tax and Customs • Governmental; Budget	4 February 2014 – 26 October 2017	People's Party for Freedom and Democracy	Rutte II
Menno Snel	Menno Snel (born 1970)	• Fiscal Policy • Tax and Customs • Governmental; Budget	26 October 2017 – 18 December 2019; Resigned	Democrats 66	Rutte III
Hans Vijlbrief	Hans Vijlbrief (born 1963)	• Fiscal Policy • Taxes • Governmental; Budget	29 January 2020 – 10 January 2022	Democrats 66	Rutte III
Alexandra van Huffelen	Alexandra van Huffelen (born 1968)	• Customs • Benefits	29 January 2020 – 10 January 2022	Democrats 66	Rutte III
Marnix van Rij	Marnix van Rij (born 1960)	• Fiscal Policy • Tax • Governmental; Budget	10 January 2022 – 2 July 2024	Christian; Democratic Appeal	Rutte IV
Aukje de Vries	Aukje de Vries (born 1964)	• Customs • Benefits	10 January 2022 – 2 July 2024	People's Party for Freedom and Democracy	Rutte IV
	Folkert Idsinga (born 1971)	• Fiscal Policy • Tax Administration	2 July 2024 – 1 November 2024	New Social Contract	Schoof
	Nora Achahbar (born 1982)	• Customs • Benefits	2 July 2024 – 15 November 2024	New Social Contract	Schoof
	Tjebbe van Oostenbruggen (born 1979)	• Fiscal Policy • Tax Administration • Customs	15 November 2024 – 22 August 2025	New Social Contract	Schoof
	Sandra Palmen (born 1972)	• Benefits • Redress	12 December 2024 – 22 August 2025	New Social Contract	Schoof
	Sandra Palmen (born 1972)	• Benefits • Redress	5 September 2025 – Incumbent	Independent	Schoof
	Eugène Heijnen (born 1964)	• Fiscal Policy • Tax Administration • Customs	5 September 2025 – Incumbent	Farmer–Citizen Movement	Schoof

^{Appt} Appointment: Fons van der Stee appointed Minister of Agriculture and Fisheries; Willem Vermeend appointed Minister of Social Affairs and Employment; Joop Wijn appointed Minister of Economic Affairs; Jan Kees de Jager appointed Minister of Finance.

== See also ==
- Ministry of Finance
