= Slotemaker =

Slotemaker is a surname. Notable people with the surname include:

- Gerard Slotemaker de Bruïne (1899–1976), Dutch politician
- Jan Rudolph Slotemaker de Bruïne (1869–1941), Dutch politician and Christian minister
- Rob Slotemaker (1929–1979), racing driver from the Netherlands
