= Second Colijn cabinet =

Cabinet of the Netherlands, 1933 to 1935

- Cabinet of the Netherlands

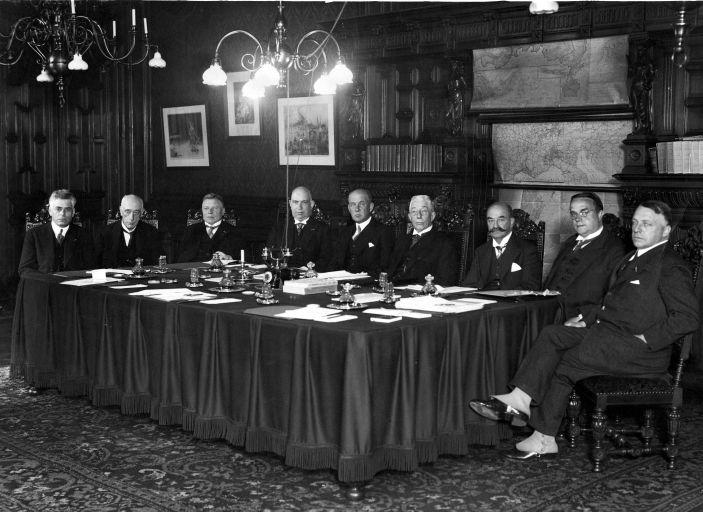
- The first meeting of the Second Colijn cabinet on 26 May 1933
- Date formed: 26 May 1933
- Date dissolved: 31 July 1935 (Demissionary from 23 July 1935)

People and organisations
- Head of state: Queen Wilhelmina
- Head of government: Hendrikus Colijn
- No. of ministers: 11
- Ministers removed: 4
- Total no. of members: 13
- Member party: Roman Catholic State Party; Anti-Revolutionary Party; Christian Historical Union; Liberal State Party; Free-thinking Democratic League
- Status in legislature: Centre-right majority government

History
- Election: 1933 general election
- Legislature terms: 1933–1937
- Predecessor: Third Ruijs de Beerenbrouck cabinet
- Successor: Third Colijn cabinet

The Second Colijn cabinet was the cabinet of the Netherlands from 26 May 1933 until 31 July 1935. The cabinet was formed by the Roman Catholic State Party (RKSP), the Anti-Revolutionary Party (ARP), the Christian Historical Union (CHU), the Liberal State Party (LSP) and the Free-thinking Democratic League (VDB) after the 1933 general election. The centre-right cabinet was a majority government in the House of Representatives. It was the second of five cabinets of Hendrikus Colijn, the Leader of the Anti-Revolutionary Party as Chairman of the Council of Ministers.

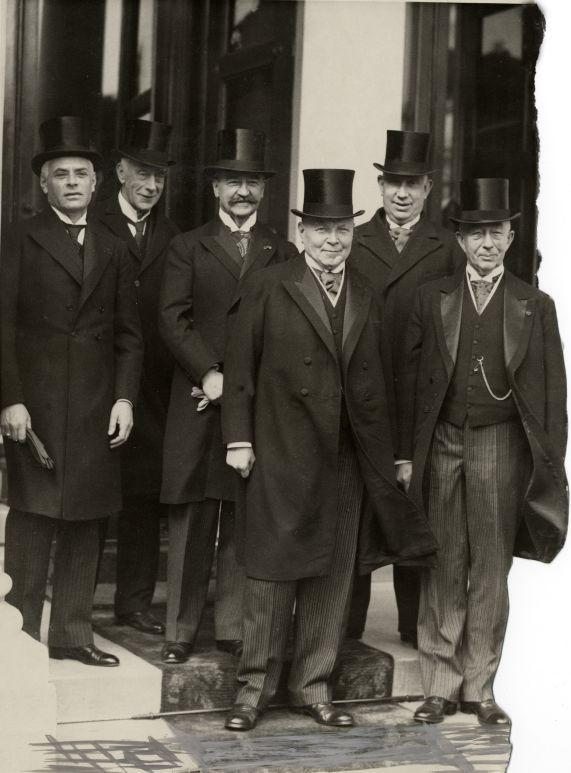
The members of the Second Colijn cabinet after the installation at Noordeinde Palace on 26 May 1933

== Composition ==
Composition
Title	Minister			Term of office	
Title	Image	Name	Party	Start	End
Chairman of the Council of the Ministers; Minister of Colonial Affairs	Hendrikus Colijn	Hendrikus Colijn	ARP	26 May 1933	31 July 1935
Minister of Foreign Affairs	Andries Cornelis Dirk de Graeff	Andries Cornelis Dirk de Graeff	Indep. (Lib.)	26 May 1933	31 July 1935
Minister of Justice	Josef van Schaik	Josef van Schaik	RKSP	26 May 1933	31 July 1935
Minister of the Interior	Jacob Adriaan de Wilde	Jacob Adriaan de Wilde	ARP	26 May 1933	31 July 1935
Minister of Education, Arts and Sciences	Henri Marchant	Henri Marchant	VDB	26 May 1933	18 May 1935
Minister of Education, Arts and Sciences	Jan Rudolph Slotemaker de Bruïne	Jan Rudolph Slotemaker de Bruïne (ad interim)	CHU	18 May 1935	31 July 1935
Minister of Finance	Pieter Oud	Pieter Oud	VDB	26 May 1933	31 July 1935
Minister of Defence	Laurent Deckers	Laurent Deckers	RKSP	26 May 1933	31 July 1935
Minister of Water Management	Jacob Kalff	Jacob Kalff	LSP	26 May 1933	13 January 1935
Minister of Water Management	Hendrikus Colijn	Hendrikus Colijn (ad interim)	ARP	13 January 1935	15 March 1935
Minister of Water Management	Otto van Lidth de Jeude	Otto van Lidth de Jeude	LSP	15 March 1935	31 July 1935
Minister of Economic Affairs and Labour (1933); Minister of Economic Affairs (1933–1935)	Timotheus Verschuur	Timotheus Verschuur	RKSP	26 May 1933	17 April 1934
Minister of Economic Affairs and Labour (1933); Minister of Economic Affairs (1933–1935)	Hendrikus Colijn	Hendrikus Colijn (ad interim)	ARP	17 April 1934	25 June 1934
Minister of Economic Affairs and Labour (1933); Minister of Economic Affairs (1933–1935)	Max Steenberghe	Max Steenberghe	RKSP	25 June 1934	6 June 1935
Minister of Economic Affairs and Labour (1933); Minister of Economic Affairs (1933–1935)	Henri Gelissen	Henri Gelissen	RKSP	6 June 1935	31 July 1935
Minister of Social Affairs	Jan Rudolph Slotemaker de Bruïne	Jan Rudolph Slotemaker de Bruïne	CHU	8 June 1933	31 July 1935
