= Wim van den Berge =

Dutch politician (1905–1987)

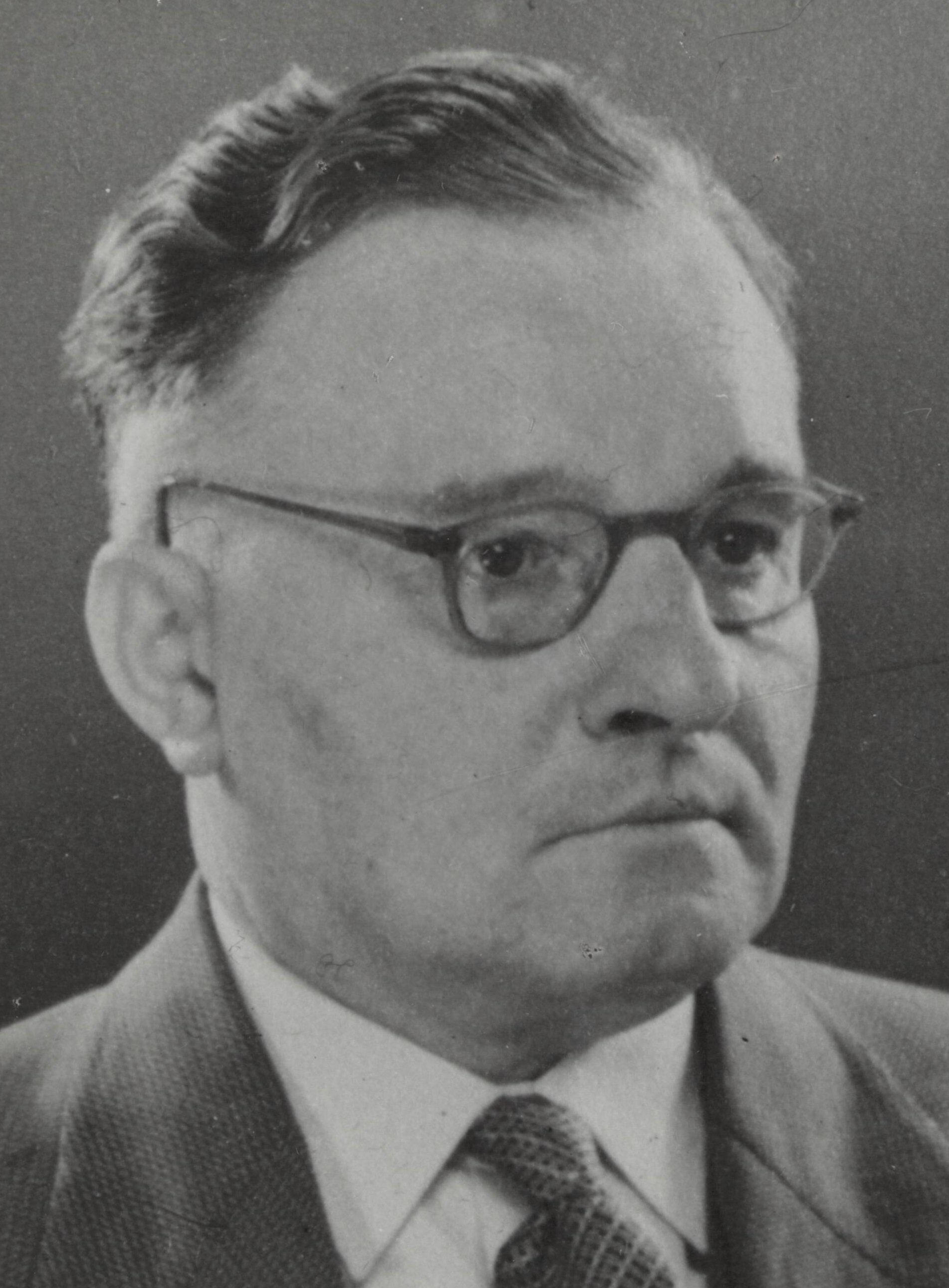
- Van den Berge in 1953

Member of the Council of State
- In office 1 June 1965 – 1 March 1980
- Vice President: Louis Beel (1965–1972); Marinus Ruppert (1972–1980)

State Secretary for Finance
- In office 27 May 1959 – 14 April 1965
- Prime Minister: Jan de Quay (1959–1963); Victor Marijnen (1963–1965)
- Preceded by: Himself (1956)
- Succeeded by: Wiel Hoefnagels
- In office 2 February 1953 – 13 October 1956
- Prime Minister: Willem Drees
- Preceded by: Office established
- Succeeded by: Himself (1959)

Personal details
- Born: Willem Hendrik van den Berge; 19 February 1905 Tholen, Netherlands
- Died: 19 February 1987 (aged 82) Leidschendam, Netherlands
- Party: Independent
- Spouse: Johanna Carolina Casparina Christina Balfoort (m. 1931)
- Children: 3 children
- Education: Leiden University (Bachelor of Laws, Master of Laws); University of Amsterdam (Doctor of Laws)
- Occupation: Politician; Civil servant; Jurist; Economist; Nonprofit director

Willem Hendrik "Wim" van den Berge (19 February 1905 – 19 February 1987) was a Dutch Independent politician. He served as State Secretary for Finance from 2 February 1953 until 13 October 1956 in the Cabinet Drees II and from 27 May 1959 until 14 April 1965 in the Cabinets De Quay and Marijnen.

== Decorations ==
Honours
| Ribbon bar | Honour | Country | Date | Comment | Reference |
|---|---|---|---|---|---|
| | Commander of the Order of the Netherlands Lion | Netherlands | | | |
| | Honorary Cross of the Order of the House of Orange | Netherlands | | | |

Political offices
| Preceded by Office established Himself (1956) | State Secretary for Finance; 1953–1956; 1959–1963 | Succeeded by Himself (1959); Wiel Hoefnagels |
