= Henk Hofstra =

Dutch politician (1904–1999)

His Excellency Henk Hofstra
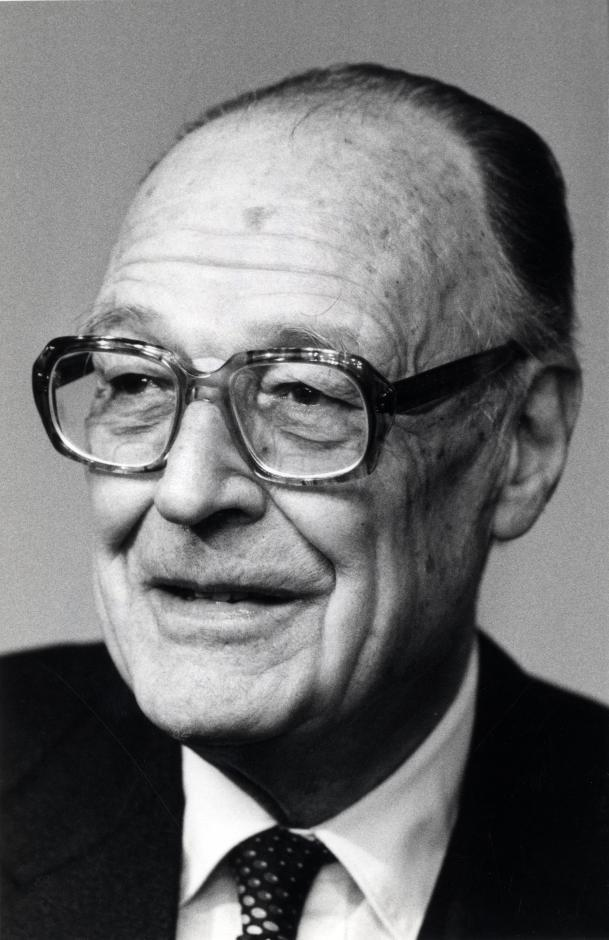
- Henk Hofstra in 1984

Minister of Finance
- In office 13 October 1956 – 22 December 1958
- Prime Minister: Willem Drees
- Preceded by: Jo van de Kieft
- Succeeded by: Jelle Zijlstra

Member of the House of Representatives
- In office 20 March 1959 – 1 January 1961
- In office 30 October 1946 – 13 October 1956
- In office 20 November 1945 – 4 June 1946
- Parliamentary group: Labour Party (1946–1961); Social Democratic; Workers' Party (1945–1946)

Personal details
- Born: Hendrik Jan Hofstra; 28 September 1904 Amsterdam, Netherlands
- Died: 16 February 1999 (aged 94) Wassenaar, Netherlands
- Party: Labour Party (from 1946)
- Other political affiliations: Social Democratic; Workers' Party (until 1946)
- Spouse: Willemine Odilia Petri (m. 1925; died 1979)
- Children: 2 children
- Education: University of Amsterdam (Bachelor of Laws, Master of Laws)
- Occupation: Politician · Civil servant · Jurist · Economist · Financial analyst · Corporate director · Nonprofit director · Author · Professor

Hendrik Jan "Henk" Hofstra (28 September 1904 – 16 February 1999) was a Dutch politician of the Labour Party (PvdA).

== Decorations ==
Honours
Ribbon bar	Honour	Country	Date	Comment
	Commander of the Order of Orange-Nassau	Netherlands	22 December 1958	
	Commander of the Order of the Netherlands Lion	Netherlands	27 May 1989	Elevated from Knight (29 April 1955)

Political offices
Preceded by Jo van de Kieft	Minister of Finance; 1956–1958	Succeeded by Jelle Zijlstra
Business positions
Unknown	Vice Chairman of Damen Verolme Rotterdam; 1961–1966	Unknown
