= Jo van de Kieft =

Dutch politician

His Excellency Jo van de Kieft
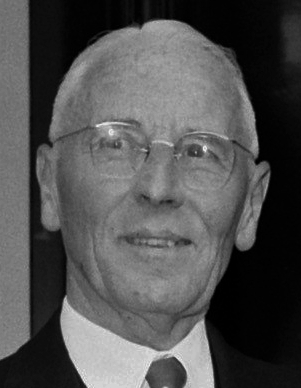
- Van de Kieft in 1955

Minister of Finance
- In office 2 September 1952 – 13 October 1956
- Prime Minister: Willem Drees
- Preceded by: Willem Drees (ad interim)
- Succeeded by: Henk Hofstra

Parliamentary leader in the Senate
- In office 27 March 1947 – 15 July 1952
- Preceded by: Marius Reinalda
- Succeeded by: Kees Woudenberg
- Parliamentary group: Labour Party

Member of the Senate
- In office 18 October 1945 – 15 July 1952
- Preceded by: Herman Bernard Wiardi Beckman

Personal details
- Born: Johan van de Kieft; 21 May 1884 Amsterdam, Netherlands
- Died: 22 August 1970 (aged 86) Assen, Netherlands
- Party: Labour Party (from 1946)
- Other political affiliations: Social Democratic Workers' Party (1908–1946)
- Spouses: Cornelia Bolderheij (m. 1908; died 1938) Friederika Simon (m. 1939; died 1965) Neeltje Faassen (m. 1968)
- Children: 5 daughters and 2 sons (first marriage)
- Occupation: Politician · Businessman · Accountant · Salesman · Nonprofit director

Johan "Jo" van de Kieft (21 May 1884 – 22 August 1970) was a Dutch politician of the Labour Party (PvdA) and businessman.

== Biography ==
He was a municipal councillor in Bussum.

== Decorations ==
Honours
Ribbon bar	Honour	Country	Date	Comment
	Knight of the Order of the Netherlands Lion	Netherlands	15 July 1952	
	Grand Officer of the Legion of Honour	France	1955	
	Commander of the Order of Orange-Nassau	Netherlands	21 November 1956	Elevated from Knight (31 August 1946)

Party political offices
Preceded by Marius Reinalda	Parliamentary leader of the Labour Party in the Senate; 1947–1952	Succeeded by Kees Woudenberg
Political offices
Preceded by Willem Drees; Ad interim	Minister of Finance; 1952–1956	Succeeded by Henk Hofstra
