= First Colijn cabinet =

Cabinet of the Netherlands, 1925 to 1926

- Cabinet of the Netherlands
- Date formed: 4 August 1925
- Date dissolved: 8 March 1926 (Demissionary from 11 November 1925)

People and organisations
- Head of state: Queen Wilhelmina
- Head of government: Hendrikus Colijn
- No. of ministers: 9
- Member party: General League; Anti-Revolutionary Party; Christian Historical Union
- Status in legislature: Centre-right majority government

History
- Incoming formation: 1925 Dutch cabinet formation
- Outgoing formation: 1925–1926 Dutch cabinet formation
- Election: 1925 general election
- Legislature terms: 1925–1929
- Predecessor: Second Ruijs de Beerenbrouck cabinet
- Successor: First De Geer cabinet

The First Colijn cabinet was the cabinet of the Netherlands from 4 August 1925 until 8 March 1926. Prime Minister Colijn and his cabinet had tendered their resignations on 11 November but remained in a caretaker government until Dirk Jan De Geer formed a new government on 8 March. The cabinet was formed by the political parties General League of Roman Catholic Electoral Associations (AB), Anti-Revolutionary Party (ARP) and the Christian Historical Union (CHU) after the 1925 general election. The centre-right cabinet was a majority government in the House of Representatives. It was the first of five cabinets of Hendrikus Colijn, the Leader of the Anti-Revolutionary Party as Chairman of the Council of Ministers.

== Composition ==
Composition
Title	Minister			Term of office	
Title	Image	Name	Party	Start	End
Chairman of the Council of Ministers; Minister of Finance	Hendrikus Colijn	Hendrikus Colijn	ARP	4 August 1925	8 March 1926
Minister of the Interior and Agriculture	Dirk Jan de Geer	Dirk Jan de Geer	CHU	4 August 1925	8 March 1926
Minister of Foreign Affairs	Herman van Karnebeek	Herman van Karnebeek	Indep. (Note: Liberal)	4 August 1925	8 March 1926
Minister of Justice		Jan Schokking	CHU	4 August 1925	8 March 1926
Minister of Labour, Commerce and Industry	Dionysius Koolen	Dionysius Koolen	General League	4 August 1925	8 March 1926
Minister of War; Minister of the Navy	Johan Lambooij	Johan Lambooij	General League	4 August 1925	8 March 1926
Minister of Education, Arts and Sciences	Victor Rutgers	Victor Rutgers	ARP	4 August 1925	8 March 1926
Minister of Water Management		Max Bongaerts	General League	4 August 1925	8 March 1926
Minister of Colonial Affairs	Hendrikus Colijn	Hendrikus Colijn (ad interim)	ARP	4 August 1925	1 October 1925
Minister of Colonial Affairs	Charles Welter	Charles Welter	General League	1 October 1925	8 March 1926
