= Mien Marchant =

Dutch artist

- Born: 6 June 1866; Gorinchem, Netherlands
- Died: 24 February 1952 (aged 85); Laren, Netherlands
- Known for: Painting

Cornelia Wilhelmina "Mien" Marchant (1866-1952) was a Dutch artist.

== Biography ==
Marchant was born on 6 June 1866 in Gorinchem. She was a student of Sieger Baukema, Martinus Wilhelmus Liernur, and Antoon Lodewijk George Offermans. Her work was included in the 1939 exhibition and sale Onze Kunst van Heden (Our Art of Today) at the Rijksmuseum in Amsterdam. She was a member of the Kunstenaarsvereniging Sint Lucas (Artists association Sint Lucas) and the Kunstenaarsvereniging Laren-Blaricum (Artists association Laren-Blaricum). Marchant died on 11 July 1973 in Laren, North Holland.
