= Jan Kan =

Dutch writer

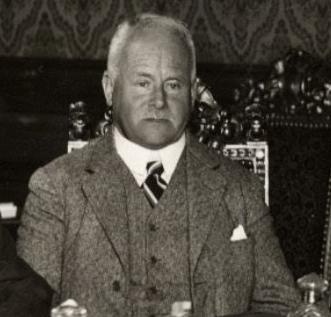
- Jan Kan in 1926
- Born: 18 May 1873; Nijmegen, Netherlands
- Died: 8 May 1947 (aged 73); The Hague, Netherlands
- Occupation: Writer

Jan Kan (18 May 1873 – 8 May 1947) was a Dutch writer. His work was part of the literature event in the art competition at the 1932 Summer Olympics.
