= Gerard Slotemaker de Bruïne =

Dutch politician

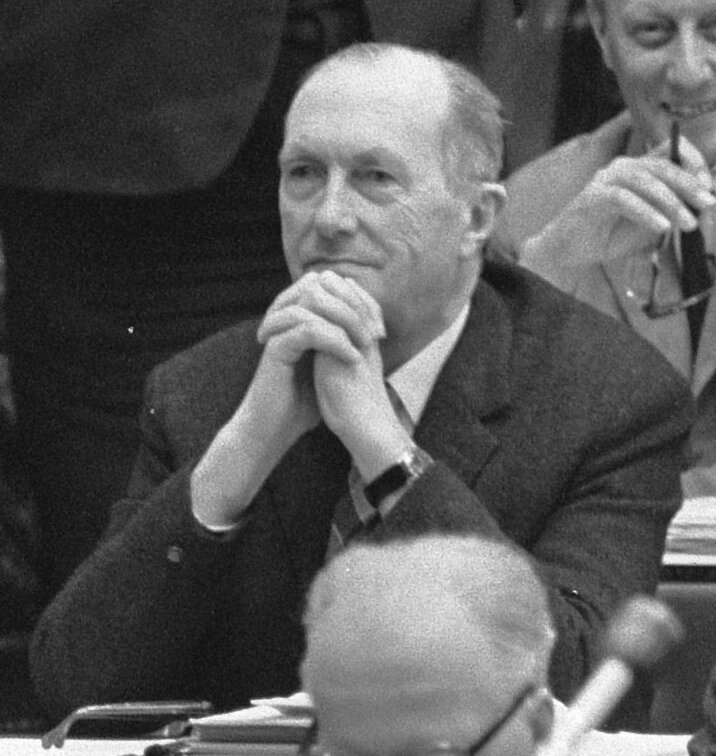
Gerard Slotemaker de Bruine (1966)

Gerard Hendrik Slotemaker de Bruïne (29 January 1899, in Beilen – 27 December 1976, in The Hague) was a Dutch politician.
