= Marcus Slingenberg =

Dutch politician

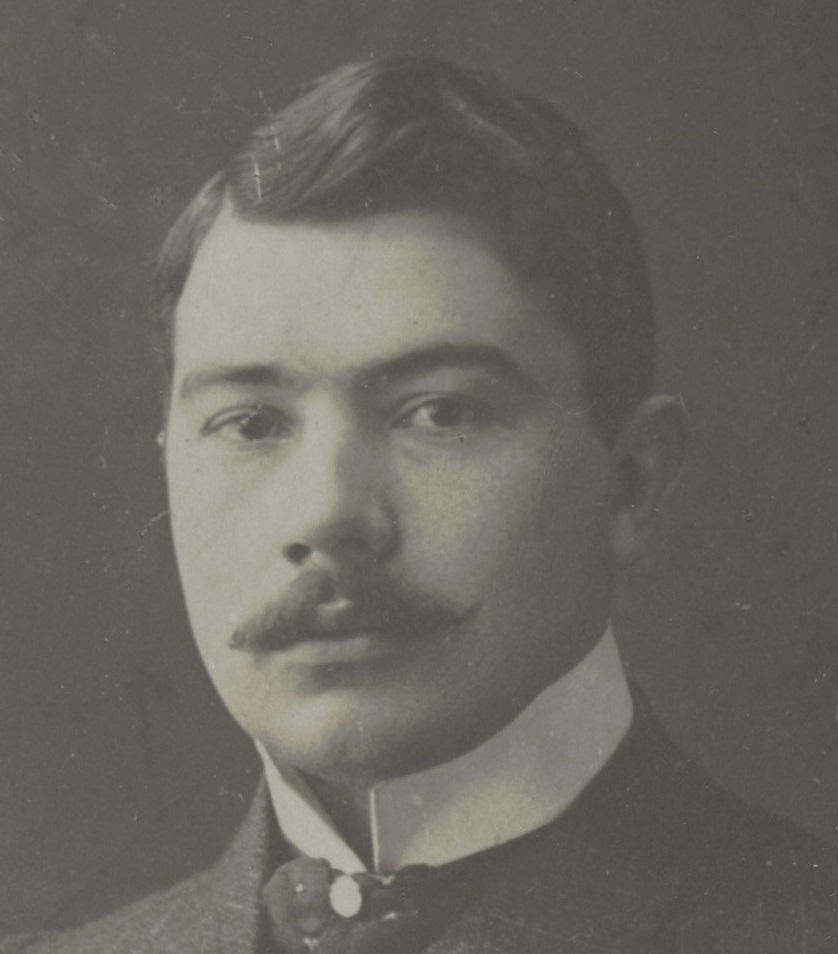
Marcus Slingenberg in 1920.

Marcus Slingenberg (21 October 1881 in Beerta – 9 May 1941 in Haarlem) was a Dutch politician of the Free-thinking Democratic League (VDB). He was among others an alderman of Haarlem.
