= Timotheus Verschuur =

Dutch politician

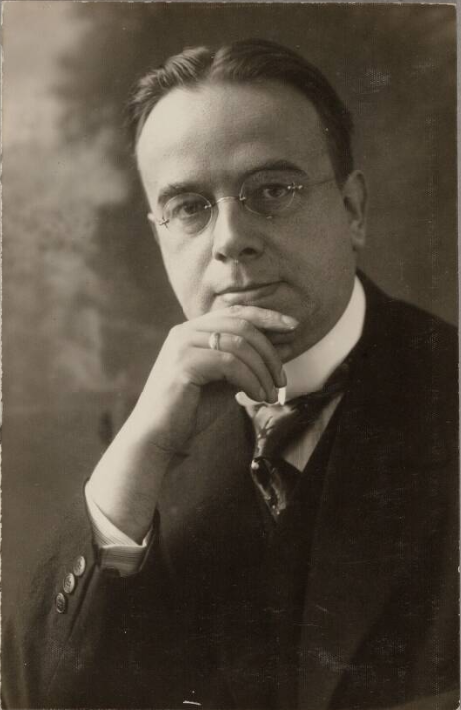
Timotheus Verschuur

Timotheus Josephus Verschuur (18 March 1886, Utrecht – 17 April 1945, Sachsenhausen) was a Dutch politician.
