= Frans Beelaerts van Blokland =

Dutch diplomat

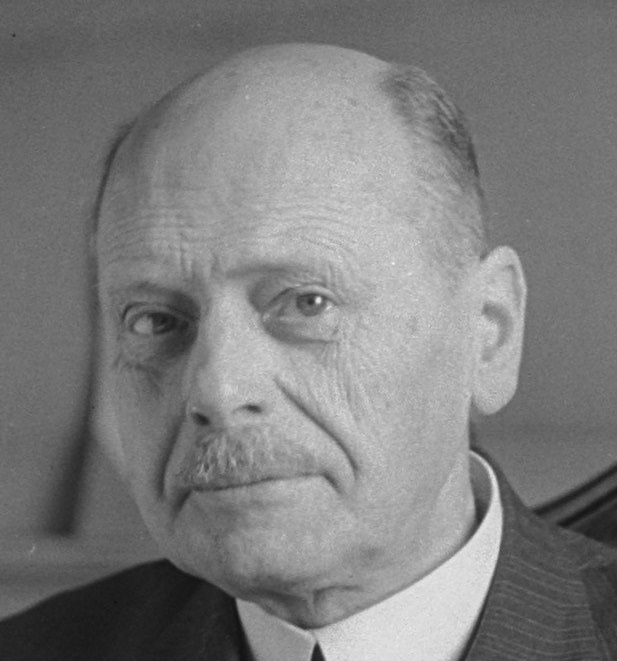
Beelaerts van Blokland in 1942

Frans Beelaerts van Blokland (21 January 1872 – 27 March 1956) was a Dutch politician and diplomat.

== Personal life ==
After attending the private school, Van Bouscholte, and Gymnasium Haganum, Beelaerts van Blokland studied at the Rijksuniversiteit Leiden from 1890 to 1895.

In 1905, he married Maria Adriana Snoeck (1873-1948), a courtier of Queen Wilhelmina, with whom he had two sons.

== Career ==
Beelaerts van Blokland served as Dutch envoy to China.

Beelaerts van Blokland accompanied in May 1940 Queen Wilhelmina to London as her chief adviser. He was Minister of Foreign Affairs and then became Vice-President of the Council of State, a position he held for 23 years. He died at the age of 84, still in office.

He was a Knight Grand Cross of the Order of the Dutch Lion and Grand Officer of the Order of Orange-Nassau.
