= Roman Catholic State Party =

Roman Catholic State Party Roomsch-Katholieke Staatspartij
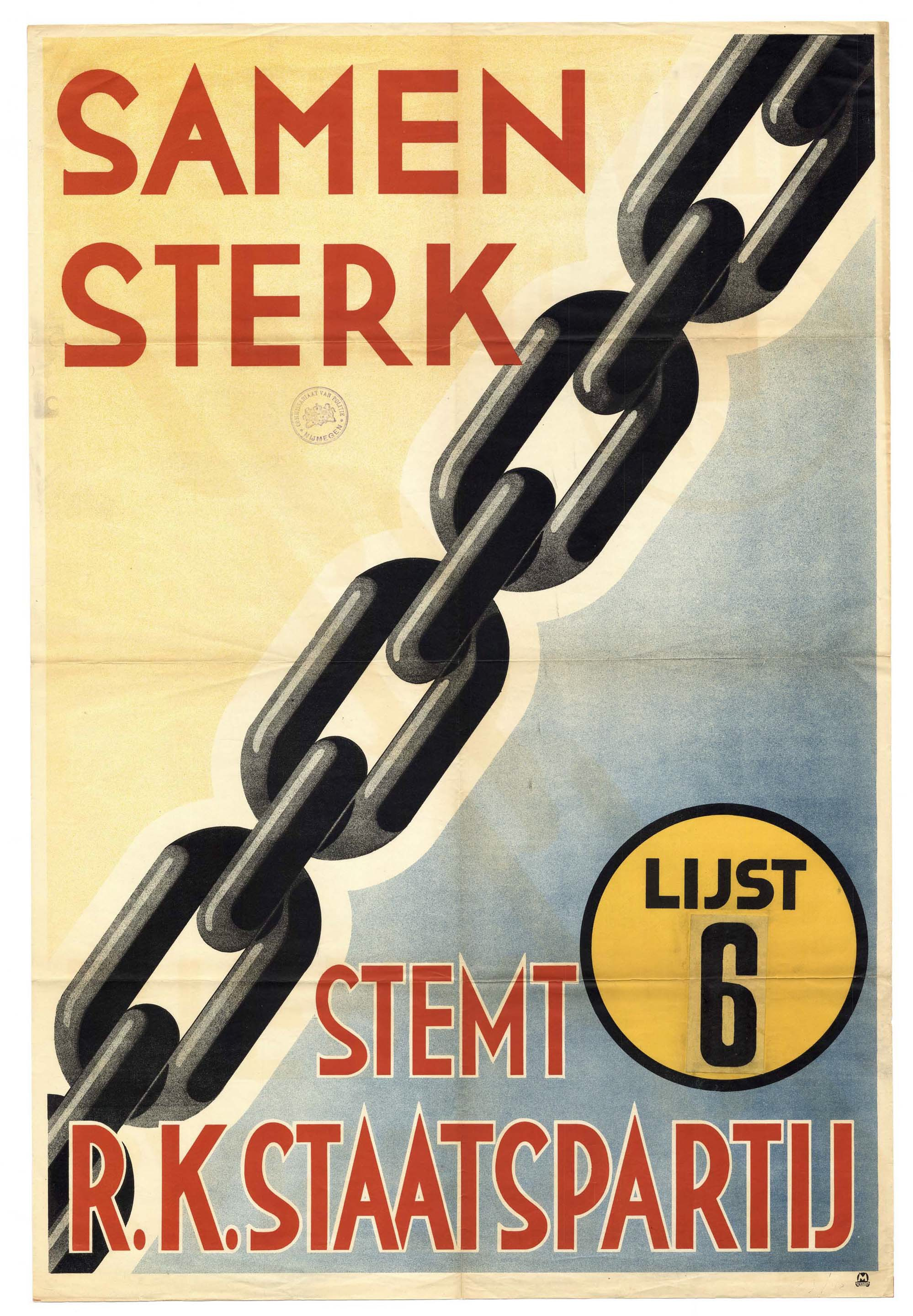
- Abbreviation: RKSP
- Leader: Wiel Nolens (1926–1931); Piet Aalberse (1931–1936); Carel Goseling (1936–1939)
- Founder: Wiel Nolens; Max Kolkman; Jan Loeff; Piet Aalberse
- Founded: 3 June 1926
- Dissolved: 22 December 1945
- Preceded by: General League of Roman Catholic Electoral Associations
- Merged into: Catholic People's Party
- Headquarters: The Hague
- Think tank: Centrum voor Staatkundige Vorming
- Ideology: Christian democracy Social conservatism Political Catholicism
- Political position: Centre
- Religion: Roman Catholicism
- International affiliation: White International (from 1928)

The Roman Catholic State Party (Dutch: Roomsch-Katholieke Staatspartij, RKSP) was a Catholic Christian democratic political party in the Netherlands. The party was founded in 1926 as a continuation of the General League of Roman Catholic Electoral Associations. During its entire existence, the party was in government. In 1945 the party became the Catholic People's Party (KVP).

== History ==
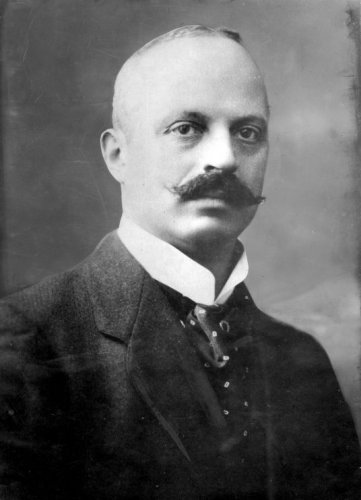
Charles Ruijs de Beerenbrouck was Prime Minister of the Netherlands from 1918 to 1925, and again from 1929 to 1933.

The RKSP was founded 3 June 1926, as the continuation of the General League of Roman Catholic Electoral Associations. Since 1918, the General League called itself RKSP informally. Instead of the loose league of caucuses with little party discipline, as the General League was, the RKSP became a real party, with stronger party discipline and organisation. In 1922 another Catholic party, the Roman Catholic People's Party, was founded by former members of the General League. It was oriented towards Catholic workers. The General League received little competition from this party, but accelerated the RKSP's process of party-formation.

During the 1920s and the 1930s, the RKSP was the biggest party in the Netherlands, receiving a steady 30% percent of the vote at each election. During this entire period the party was in government, in coalition with the Anti-Revolutionary Party (ARP) and the Christian Historical Union (CHU), two Protestant parties. This coalition was called the Coalition. Despite its success, the party was blocked from many political offices. Positions like the Vice-President of the Council of State and the President of the Senate and House of Representatives of the States General were all occupied by Protestants. The RKSP also supplied only one Prime Minister, Charles Ruijs de Beerenbrouck, between 1929 and 1933.

The cooperation with the ARP and CHU was problematic. In 1925 the Ruijs de Beerenbrouck cabinet was composed of the ARP, the CHU and the General League fell over the Dutch representation at the Holy See. This issue continued to divide the RKSP and the CHU and the ARP, as did the prohibition of traditional marches by Catholic churches and the role of government in the economy. The second Colijn cabinet fell because the RKSP wanted a more interventionist economic policy, but that cabinet was restored. In 1939, however, the fourth Colijn cabinet fell again on economic policy. In 1939, a coalition of RKSP, CHU, Free-thinking Democratic League (VDB) and Social Democratic Workers' Party (SDAP) ended more than 20 years of Coalition government.

After World War II, the RKSP was replaced by the Catholic People's Party.

== Ideology ==
The RKSP based on biblical norms and Catholic dogma. An important encyclical was Rerum novarum of 1891. In this Pope Leo XIII called for stronger government interference in the economy. The RKSP wanted strong government control over public morality: divorce should be limited, the Sunday's rest was to be kept, cinemas and theatres should be kept under tight government control, alcohol addiction should be combated.

The party was a staunch proponent of a corporatist economy, where employer's organisations, unions and state work together for the common good. The RKSP was in favour of social and labour legislation. During Great Depression, the call for a more active role of government was strengthened.

Regarding foreign affairs, the RKSP was an advocate of Dutch neutrality, which was to be maintained by a strong army and navy. Furthermore, the party was in favour of the colonial government of the Dutch East Indies.

== Electoral performance ==
Election	Votes	%	Seats	±	Government
1929	1,001,589	29.6	30 / 100	Steady	Coalition
1933	1,037,364	27.9	28 / 100	▼2	Coalition
1937	1,170,431	28.8	31 / 100	▲3	Coalition

== Linked organisations ==
The KVP had close links to many other Catholic institutions such as the Catholic Church and together they formed the Catholic pillar. These organisations included the Catholic Labour Union, the Catholic Employers Organisation, the Catholic Farmers' Organisation, Catholic Hospitals united in the Yellow-White Cross and Catholic Schools. The Catholic Broadcasting Association KRO and the Catholic paper De Volkskrant were the voices of the RKSP.

== Important figures ==
The Limburg-based priest Wiel Nolens led the party since its foundation until his death in 1931.

The former professor and minister Piet Aalberse succeeded Nolens.

Other prominent figures were Charles Ruijs de Beerenbrouck, Prime Minister between 1918 and 1925, and again from 1929 and 1933, and the young Carl Romme, who would lead the KVP in the 1940s and 1950s.

== Electorate ==
The RKSP was supported by Catholics of all classes. In North Brabant and Limburg, it often got more than 90% of the vote.

== Literature ==
- Roes, Jan (2004). Kaiser, Wolfram; Wohnout, Helmut (eds.). A Historical Detour: The Roman Catholic State Party in the Netherlands. Political Catholicism in Europe 1918-45. Routledge. pp. 65–76. ISBN 0-7146-5650-X.
