= Cabinet of the Netherlands =

Executive body of the Dutch government

The cabinet of the Netherlands (Dutch: Nederlands kabinet) is the main executive body of the Netherlands. The current cabinet of the Netherlands is the Jetten cabinet, which has been in office since 23 February 2026. It is headed by Prime Minister Rob Jetten.

== Composition and role ==
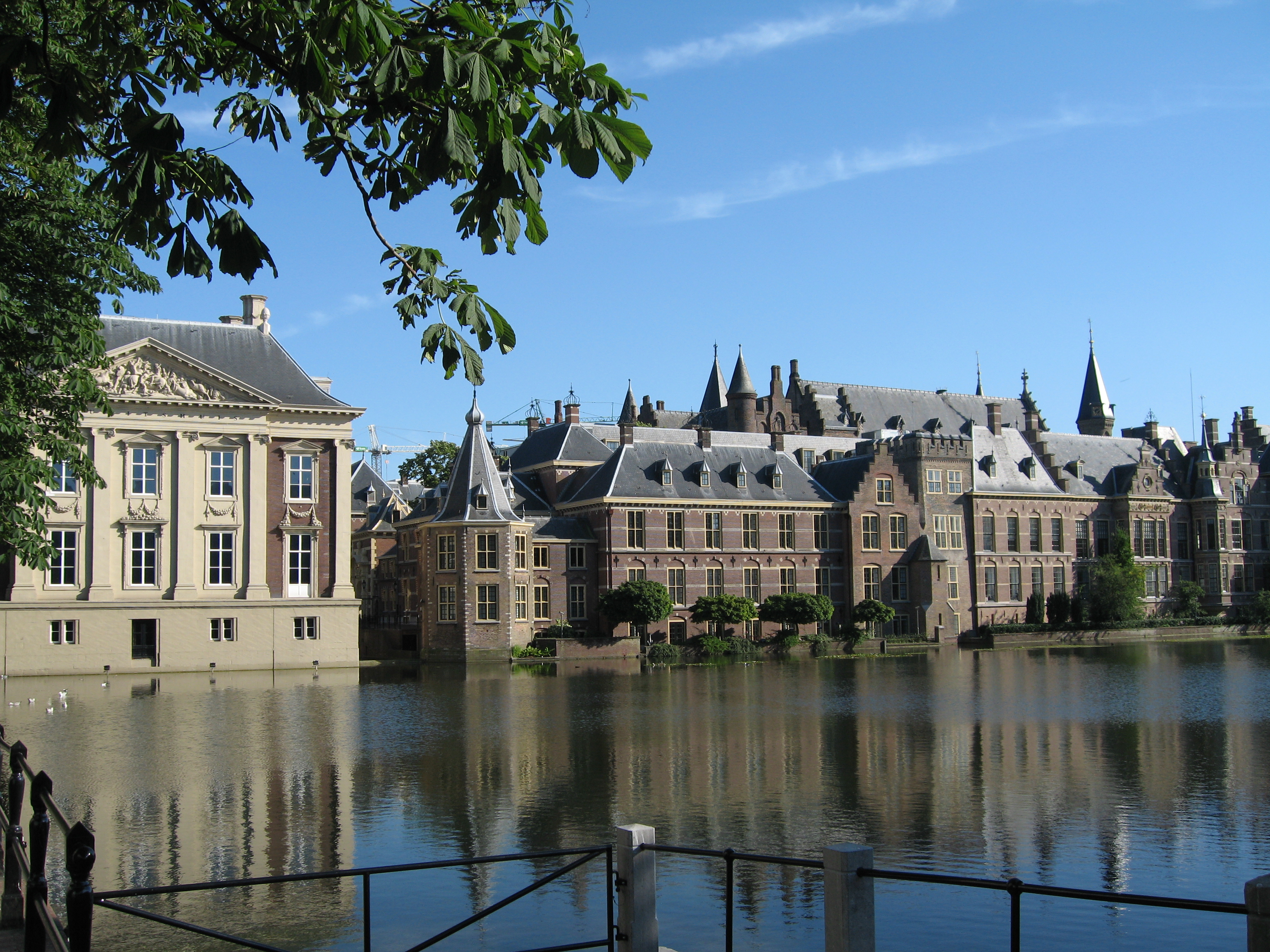
The Hague's Binnenhof. The Ministry of General Affairs, where the Council of Ministers meets every Friday, is in the centre.

The cabinet consists of the ministers and state secretaries, and is led by the prime minister.

Pursuant to article 44 of the Constitution, each ministry is headed by a minister. In this capacity, the minister is responsible for the civil service of his or her own ministry, and can issue orders and instructions, as well as guidelines and policy rules for the performance of statutory and administrative tasks. In this context, the minister also has legal prerogatives with regard to civil servants, such as appointment and dismissal. Furthermore, the minister is responsible for managing the ministry's budget. Ministers without portfolio can also be appointed. These ministers do not head a ministry, but are responsible for a policy area within a ministry. For example, the Ministry of Foreign Affairs is headed by the Minister of Foreign Affairs, but there is also a Minister for Foreign Trade and Development Aid placed in the same ministry.

All ministers, including ministers without portfolio, together constitute the Council of Ministers. Article 45 of the Constitution states that the Council of Ministers "deliberates and decides on general government policy and promotes the unity of that policy." For this purpose, it meets every Friday in the Trêveszaal in the Binnenhof, under the chairmanship of the prime minister or a deputy prime minister. In these confidential meetings, possible differences of opinion between ministers are settled so that the Council of Ministers can take decisions collectively and present a unified position to parliament, in line with the principle of cabinet collective responsibility. Typically, a good deal of effort is put into reaching relative consensus on any decision. A process of voting within the Council does exist, but is hardly ever used.

Article 46 of the Constitution allows for the appointment of state secretaries who, like ministers without portfolio, are responsible for a particular policy area within a ministry. Unlike ministers without portfolio, however, state secretaries do not attend meetings of the Council of Ministers unless invited, and even then they have no voting rights. Within their ministry, state secretaries are subordinate to the minister, but they bear individual ministerial responsibility toward parliament with respect to their own policy area. Some state secretaries are given the right to call themselves "Minister" in other countries and be treated as such for protocolary purposes.

Together with the King, the Council of Ministers forms the Government, which makes all the major decisions. In practice, the King does not participate in the daily decision-making of government, although he is kept up to date by weekly meetings with the Prime Minister. The Constitution does not speak of cabinet, but instead only of the Council of Ministers and Government.

The ministers, individually and collectively (as cabinet), are responsible to the States-General for government policy and must enjoy its confidence. It is not possible for a minister to be a member of parliament. Ministers or state secretaries who are no longer supported by a parliamentary majority are also expected by convention to step down. In contrast to the Westminster system, Dutch ministers may not simultaneously also be members of the States-General, although members of the States-General can be appointed as ministers, whereupon their seats become vacant.

An important question is whether the relationship between the cabinet and parliament should be dualistic or monistic. That is, whether ministers and parliamentary leaders of governing parties should coordinate important political decisions. According to the dualistic position, members of parliament of governing parties should function independently of the cabinet. The monistic position, by contrast, is that the cabinet plays an important role in proposing legislation and policy.

== Formation ==
After a general election held generally every four years, or if a cabinet resigns during a parliamentary term, the process of cabinet formation starts. Because of the multi-party system of the Netherlands, no single party has had a majority in parliament since 1900, and formation of a coalition of two or often three parties is always necessary. This is a time-consuming process. The entire procedure is regulated by tradition and convention, with only the final appointment process specified by law.

Since 2012, the House of Representative appoints a scout to explore which political parties are willing to form a cabinet together. In the subsequent information phase, negotiations will take place under the leadership of an informateur about the government's future policy programme, to be recorded in a coalition agreement.. If negotiations break down, a new informateur is appointed and the information process begins afresh. If the informateur is successful, the portfolios are determined, divided among the parties and ministers and state secretaries are sought under the leadership of a formateur. The formateur is usually the prospective Prime Minister.

If the formateur is successful, the Monarch appoints all ministers and state secretaries individually by Royal Decision (Koninklijk Besluit). Each Minister privately swears an oath of loyalty to the Constitution. After this the entire Council of Ministers and the King or Queen regnant are photographed on the stairs of the palace Huis ten Bosch during the bordes scene. The new cabinet then presents their government statement to parliament.

Between the dissolution of the States-General before general elections and the appointment of a new cabinet, the incumbent cabinet is termed demissionair, that is, a caretaker government limiting itself to urgent and pressing matters and traditionally not taking any controversial decisions. If a Cabinet falls during a parliamentary term because one of the coalition partners withdraws its support, the coalition partner in question may leave. This does not result in a demissionair Cabinet, unless the Prime Minister is granted a dissolution of the States-General. Instead, the remaining parties in the governing coalition form a rompkabinet ("rump cabinet"). If the parties do not between them control a majority of the House of Representatives, the cabinet continues as a minority government.

== History ==
Established in 1798, the Uitvoerend Bewind of the Batavian Republic is considered to be the first government of the Netherlands.

The first cabinet of the Kingdom of the Netherlands was formed in 1848 after a constitution was adopted which limited the power of the King and introduced the principle of ministerial responsibility to parliament. Until 1888 cabinets lacked a real coordinating role, and instead ministers were focused on their own department. After 1888 cabinets became more political.

Of the 33 coalition governments since World War II, only three excluded the largest party (all three times PvdA) and the largest number of parties in a coalition was 5 (in 1971 and 1973). After that, the three major Christian-democratic parties merged into CDA, and 2- or 3-party coalitions became standard.

Since 1945 there have been 33 cabinets, which were headed by 17 prime ministers. Willem Drees and Jan Peter Balkenende both chaired the most cabinets (four) and Mark Rutte served as prime minister the longest (between 2010 and 2024). The second Rutte cabinet was the longest lasting cabinet since World War II (1,816 days); only the cabinet led by Theo Heemskerk sat longer (2025 days). The first Balkenende cabinet is the shortest lasting normal cabinet since World War II (87 days); only the fifth cabinet of Hendrikus Colijn lasted shorter (10 days).

Prime minister member of CDA (KVP/ARP)
Prime minister member of PvdA (VDB)
Prime minister member of VVD
Independent prime minister
Prime minister member of D66

== Types ==
There are different types of cabinets:

- A demissionary cabinet (demissionair kabinet) is a caretaker government during the election campaign and the formation of a new cabinet.
- An extra-parliamentary cabinet (extraparlementair kabinet) not based on a parliamentary majority. The last extra-parliamentary cabinet was the Den Uyl cabinet. It consisted of members of the three progressive parties (the social democratic PvdA, the social liberal D66, and the progressive Christian PPR) and progressive members from the Christian democratic ARP and KVP. It is contrasted with a parliamentary cabinet, which does have an explicit majority in parliament.
- A rump cabinet (rompkabinet) is the continuation of a Dutch cabinet when it has lost a coalition partner, typically a form of minority government, where the cabinet has not become demissionary, but seeks support from a majority of parliament to finish the work that was already introduced by the cabinet to the parliament. Normally the Dutch Monarch will call for dissolution of parliament somewhat later, since the basis behind the coalition agreement is gone.
- A broad-basis cabinet (brede basiskabinet) is an oversized coalition or national cabinet. Between 1945 and 1959, several cabinets have included more parties than were necessary for a parliamentary majority. The first of them was the Schermerhorn cabinet. Other parties were included to give the cabinet and its far-reaching proposals, like the formation of a welfare state, a broad basis in parliament and society. The core of these cabinets were formed by the social democratic PvdA and the catholic KVP, the Roman/Red alliance which by themselves had a large majority in parliament.

== See also ==
- List of cabinets of the Netherlands
- Council of Ministers of the Kingdom of the Netherlands
