= List of Dutch scouts, informateurs and formateurs =

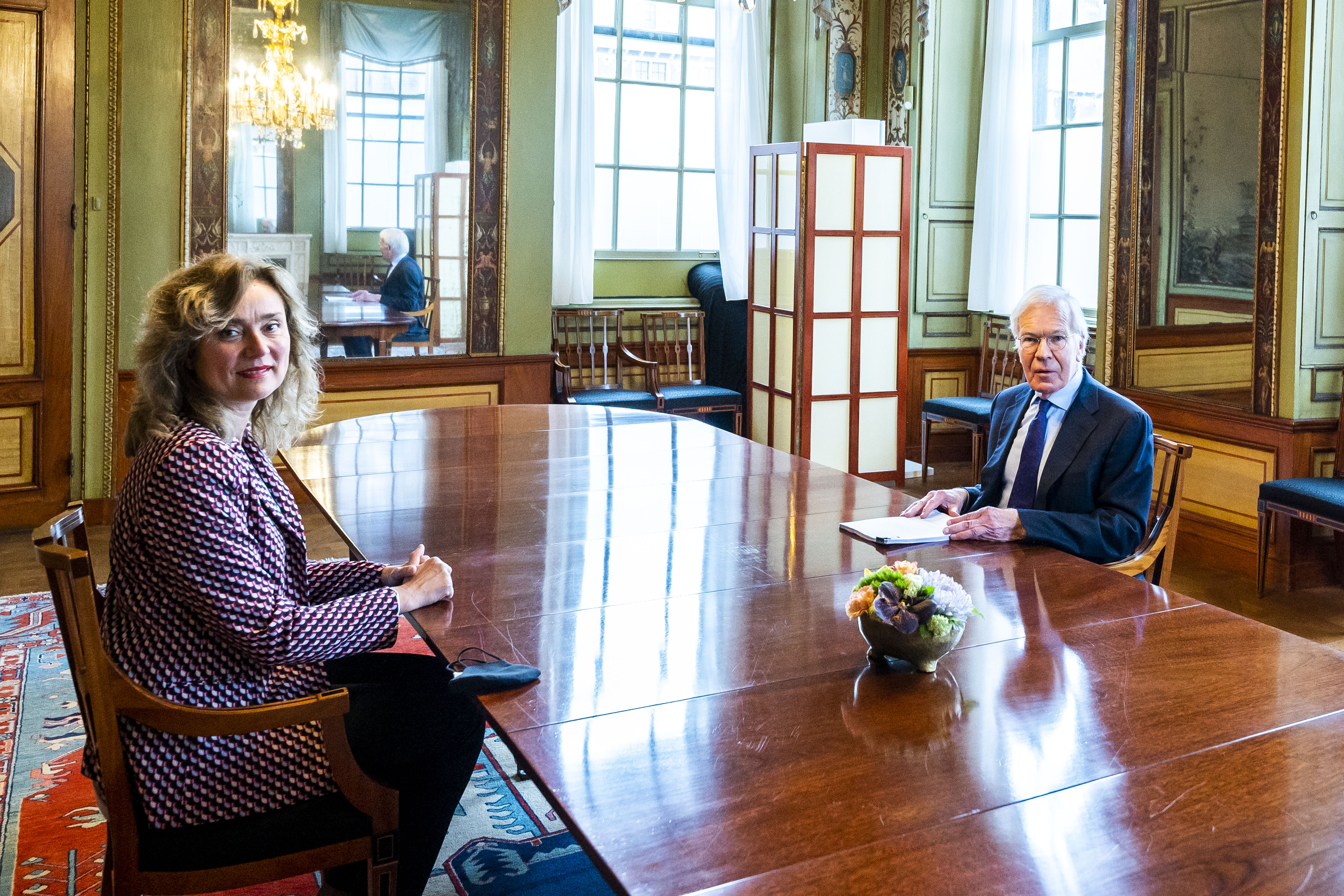
Herman Tjeenk Willink receives his assignment as informateur from Speaker of the House Vera Bergkamp during the 2021–2022 cabinet formation. He was also informateur during the 1994 (twice), 1999, 2010 and 2017 cabinet formation. As administrative secretary, he was also involved in the 1972–1973 and 1977 cabinet formation.

Scouts, informateurs and formateurs facilitate specific phases in a Dutch cabinet formation. Since 2012, the scout explores the possibilities for a coalition government in the scouting phase, which can later be done again by an informateur. Since 1951, the main responsibility of an informateur is facilitating the negotiations between political parties in the information phase. The formateur was until 1951 responsible for the entire formation, but its role has been limited since 1982 to finding the ministers and state secretaries of the cabinet in the formation phase. The roles are often filled by members of the largest party in the House of Representatives.

== Historical development ==
The roles have changed throughout the years. The role of formateur has existed since the first cabinet formation in 1848. Formateurs were in general responsible for the entire formation, simply being instructed to form a cabinet. The (final) formateur is often the intended prime minister. (Note: Exceptions include 1905, 1951 and 2023-2024.) However, some formateurs were instructed to do preliminary work (exploring coalition options and/or facilitating negotiations). (Note: Such as Gijsbert van Tienhoven in 1891, Jan Elias Nicolaas Schimmelpenninck van der Oye in 1907, Willem Hubert Nolens in 1918 and Dionysius Koolen in June–July 1939.)

In 1951, a separate role was created for the preliminary work: the informateur. Since that year, there has not been a formation without an informateur, although this has been attempted five times. Since 1989, the initial informateur is tasked with exploring the possibilities for a coalition. The first exploratory round became the responsibility of a separate role, the scout, in 2012. Since that year, the monarch no longer has a role in the formation and thus no longer does the consultations at the start of the formation. The (in)formateurs and scouts have since then been appointed by the House of Representatives.

== List ==
List of Dutch formateurs, informateurs and scouts
Name	Starting date (Note: For formateurs, this not always reflects the day they have formally accepted the assignment, but instead the day they have asked the monarch to consider the assignment.)	Days	Role	Political affiliation	Formation	Ref.
Gerrit Schimmelpenninck	23 March 1848	1	Formateur	liberal	1848	
Leonardus Antonius Lightenvelt	20 September 1849	37	Formateur	conservative	1849	
Dirk Donker Curtius	20 September 1849	37	Formateur	liberal	1849	
Johan Rudolph Thorbecke	27 October 1849	3	Formateur	liberal	1849	
Jan Nedermeijer van Rosenthal	27 October 1849	3	Formateur	liberal	1849	
Floris Adriaan van Hall	16 April 1853	3	Formateur	liberal	1853	
Justinus van der Brugghen	1 June 1856	30	Formateur	anti-revolutionary	1856	
Jan Jacob Rochussen	3 March 1858	16	Formateur	conservative	1858	
Floris Adriaan van Hall	17 February 1860	4	Formateur	liberal	1860	
Schelto van Heemstra	21 February 1860	3	Formateur	conservative	1860	
Jan Jacob Rochussen	16 February 1861	24	Formateur	conservative	1861	
Schelto van Heemstra	16 February 1861	24	Formateur	conservative	1861	
Jules van Zuylen van Nijevelt	12 March 1861	3	Formateur	anti-revolutionary	1861	
Johan Rudolph Thorbecke	18 January 1862	13	Formateur	liberal	1861–1862	
Isaäc Dignus Fransen van de Putte	29 January 1866	7	Formateur	liberal	Jan–Feb 1866	
Jules van Zuylen van Nijevelt	24 May 1866	7	Formateur	anti-revolutionary	May–Jun 1866	
Æneas Mackay Sr.	17 April 1868	2	Formateur	anti-revolutionary	1868	
Theo van Lynden van Sandenburg	29 April 1868	4	Formateur	conservative	1868	
Gerlach Cornelis Joannes van Reenen	4 May 1868	5	Formateur	conservative	1868	
Æneas Mackay Sr.	17 May 1868	5	Formateur	anti-revolutionary	1868	
Johan Rudolph Thorbecke	23 May 1868	11	Formateur	liberal	1868	
Cornelis Fock	24 November 1870	5	Formateur	liberal	1870–1871	
Lodewijk Gerard Brocx	24 November 1870	5	Formateur	liberal	1870–1871	
Johan Rudolph Thorbecke	1 December 1870	33	Formateur	liberal	1870–1871	
Gerrit de Vries	25 June 1872	10	Formateur	liberal	1872	
Jan Heemskerk	14 July 1874	43	Formateur	liberal	1874	
Jan Kappeyne van de Coppello	16 October 1877	17	Formateur	liberal	1877	
Theo van Lynden van Sandenburg	24 July 1879	9	Formateur	conservative	1879	
Eppo Cremers	12 July 1879	11	Formateur	conservative	1879	
Isaäc Dignus Fransen van de Putte	12 July 1879	11	Formateur	liberal	1879	
Gerrit de Vries	12 July 1879	11	Formateur	liberal	1879	
Theo van Lynden van Sandenburg	8 August 1882	5	Formateur	conservative	1882	
Johannes Tak van Poortvliet	31 July 1882	9	Formateur	liberal	1882	
Theo van Lynden van Sandenburg	3 July 1882	5	Formateur	conservative	1882	
Jan Heemskerk	4 March 1883	9	Formateur	liberal	1883	
Otto van Rees	12 March 1883	7	Formateur	liberal	1883	
Johan George Gleichman	19 March 1883	5	Formateur	liberal	1883	
Jan Heemskerk	29 March 1883	23	Formateur	liberal	1883	
Æneas Mackay Jr.	30 March 1888	20	Formateur	ARP	1888	
Gijsbert van Tienhoven	26 July 1891	22	Formateur	liberal	1891	
Joan Röell	4 May 1894	4	Formateur	liberal	1894	
Nicolaas Pierson	13 July 1897	10	Formateur	LU	1897	
Abraham Kuyper	11 July 1901	15	Formateur	ARP	1901	
Hendrik Goeman Borgesius	14 July 1905	34	Formateur	LU	1905	
Jan Elias Nicolaas Schimmelpenninck van der Oye	27 February 1907	3	Formateur	CHP	1907	
Pieter Cort van der Linden	17 March 1907	5	Formateur	liberal	1907	
Theo Heemskerk	16 January 1908	27	Formateur	ARP	1907–1908	
Dirk Bos	11 July 1913	15	Formateur	VDB	1913	
Pieter Cort van der Linden	2 August 1913	27	Formateur	liberal	1913	
Willem Hubert Nolens	13 July 1918	38	Formateur	RKSP	1918	
Charles Ruijs de Beerenbrouck	29 August 1918	9	Formateur	RKSP	1918	
Charles Ruijs de Beerenbrouck	22 June 1921	35	Formateur	RKSP	1921	
Dirk Jan de Geer	19 July 1922	4	Formateur	CHU	1922	
Charles Ruijs de Beerenbrouck	22 July 1922	49	Formateur	RKSP	1922	
Dionysius Koolen	15 November 1923	10	Formateur	RKSP	1923-1924	
Frans Beelaerts van Blokland	24 November 1923	12	Formateur	CHU	1923-1924	
Herman Adriaan van Karnebeek	4 January 1924	3	Formateur	liberal	1923-1924	
Hendrik Colijn	15 July 1925	18	Formateur	ARP	1925	
Henri Marchant	24 November 1925	8	Formateur	VDB	1925-1926	
Johannes Theodoor de Visser	8 December 1925	4	Formateur	CHU	1925-1926	
Johannes Theodoor de Visser	12 December 1925	42	Formateur	CHU	1925-1926	
Joseph Limburg	23 January 1926	35	Formateur	VDB (Note: His party did not participate in the negotiations. Some in his party criticised his appointment, which led hem to leave the party.)	1925-1926	
Dirk Jan de Geer	1 March 1926	4	Formateur	CHU	1925-1926	
Charles Ruijs de Beerenbrouck	12 July 1929	18	Formateur	RKSP	1929	
Charles Ruijs de Beerenbrouck	3 August 1929	7	Formateur	RKSP	1929	
Hendrik Colijn	2 May 1933	15	Formateur	ARP	1933	
Hendrik Colijn	16 May 1933	11	Formateur	ARP	1933	
Piet Aalberse	26 July 1935	2	Formateur	RKSP	1935	
Hendrik Colijn	29 July 1935	2	Formateur	ARP	1935	
Hendrik Colijn	30 May 1937	25	Formateur	ARP	1937	
Hendrik Colijn	30 June 1939	10	Formateur	ARP	Jun–Jul 1939	
Dionysius Koolen	9 July 1939	6	Formateur	RKSP	Jun–Jul 1939	
Hendrik Colijn	14 July 1939	12	Formateur	ARP	Jun–Jul 1939	
Dirk Jan de Geer	4 August 1939	6	Formateur	CHU	Aug 1939	
Pieter Gerbrandy	28 August 1940	3	Formateur	ARP	1940	
Pieter Gerbrandy	1 July 1941	26	Formateur	ARP	1941	
Pieter Gerbrandy	8 February 1945	15	Formateur	ARP	Feb 1945	
Willem Drees	28 May 1945	27	Formateur	SDAP	May–Jun 1945	
Willem Schermerhorn	28 May 1945	27	Formateur	VDB	May–Jun 1945	
Louis Beel	27 May 1946	36	Formateur	KVP	1946	
Louis Beel	13 July 1948	10	Formateur (Note: Sources from that time refer to him as formateur. However, Parlement.com describes him as informateur.)	KVP	1948	
Louis Beel	22 July 1948	8	Formateur	KVP	1948	
Josef van Schaik	30 July 1948	8	Formateur	KVP	1948	
Dirk Stikker	28 January 1951	5	Informateur	VVD	1951	
Willem Drees	1 February 1951	16	Formateur	PvdA	1951	
Josef van Schaik	1 February 1951	16	Formateur	KVP	1951	
Max Steenberghe	18 February 1951	7	Formateur	KVP	1951	
Carl Romme	13 March 1951	2	Formateur	KVP	1951	
Carl Romme	27 February 1951	15	Informateur	KVP	1951	
Willem Drees	27 June 1952	26	Formateur	PvdA	1952	
Louis Beel	23 July 1952	13	Informateur	KVP	1952	
Leendert Antonie Donker	5 August 1952	17	Formateur	PvdA	1952	
Cornelis Staf	22 August 1952	5	Formateur	CHU	1952	
Willem Drees	29 August 1952	4	Formateur	PvdA	1952	
Jaap Burger	25 May 1955	9	Formateur	PvdA	1955	
Willem Drees	16 June 1956	38	Formateur	PvdA	1956	
Carl Romme	24 June 1956	9	Formateur	KVP	1956	
Piet Lieftinck	16 August 1956	5	Informateur	PvdA	1956	
Piet Lieftinck	7 August 1956	9	Informateur	PvdA	1956	
Wilhelm Friedrich de Gaay Fortman	22 August 1956	25	Informateur	ARP	1956	
Jaap Burger	20 September 1956	19	Informateur	PvdA	1956	
Willem Drees	9 October 1956	3	Formateur	PvdA	1956	
Louis Beel	12 December 1958	7	Informateur	KVP	1958	
Louis Beel	19 December 1958	3	Formateur	KVP	1958	
Louis Beel	14 March 1959	13	Informateur	KVP	1959	
Jan de Quay	28 March 1959	30	Formateur	KVP	1959	
Louis Beel	1 May 1959	13	Informateur	KVP	1959	
Jan de Quay	14 May 1959	5	Formateur	KVP	1959	
Wilhelm Friedrich de Gaay Fortman	27 December 1960	6	Informateur	ARP	1960–1961	
Carl Romme	20 May 1963	16	Informateur	KVP	1963	
Wim de Kort	6 June 1963	21	Formateur	KVP	1963	
Louis Beel	28 June 1963	7	Informateur	KVP	1963	
Jan de Quay	5 July 1963	11	Formateur	KVP	1963	
Victor Marijnen	16 July 1963	8	Formateur	KVP	1963	
Norbert Schmelzer	2 March 1965	11	Informateur	KVP	1965	
Jo Cals	15 March 1965	29	Formateur	KVP	1965	
Norbert Schmelzer	18 October 1966	17	Informateur	KVP	1966	
Louis Beel	4 November 1966	12	Informateur	KVP	1966	
Jelle Zijlstra	16 November 1966	6	Formateur	ARP	1966	
Jelle Zijlstra	18 February 1967	15	Informateur	ARP	1967	
Louis Beel	6 March 1967	3	Informateur (Note: Formally as advisor to the queen.)	KVP	1967	
Barend Biesheuvel	9 March 1967	12	Formateur	ARP	1967	
Piet de Jong	21 March 1967	14	Formateur	KVP	1967	
Piet Steenkamp	15 May 1971	37	Informateur	KVP	1971	
Barend Biesheuvel	21 June 1971	15	Formateur	ARP	1971	
Barend Biesheuvel	22 July 1972	18	Formateur	ARP	1972	
Marinus Ruppert	4 December 1972	58	Informateur	ARP	1972–1973	
Jaap Burger	1 February 1973	62	Formateur	PvdA	1972–1973	
Dries van Agt	10 April 1973	13	Informateur	KVP	1972–1973	
Wil Albeda	10 April 1973	13	Informateur	ARP	1972–1973	
Jaap Burger	23 April 1973	18	Formateur	PvdA	1972–1973	
Marinus Ruppert	23 April 1973	18	Formateur	ARP	1972–1973	
Joop den Uyl	1 June 1977	45	Formateur	PvdA	1977	
Wil Albeda	20 July 1977	7	Informateur	CDA	1977	
Joop den Uyl	27 July 1977	30	Formateur	PvdA	1977	
Gerard Veringa	26 August 1977	7	Informateur	CDA	1977	
Gerard Veringa	2 September 1977	35	Formateur	CDA	1977	
Joop den Uyl	2 September 1977	35	Formateur	PvdA	1977	
Maarten Vrolijk	11 October 1977	15	Informateur	PvdA	1977	
Koos Verdam	11 October 1977	15	Informateur	CDA	1977	
Joop den Uyl	26 October 1977	10	Formateur	PvdA	1977	
Wim van der Grinten	8 November 1977	29	Informateur	CDA	1977	
Dries van Agt	8 December 1977	11	Formateur	CDA	1977	
Ruud Lubbers	30 May 1981	66	Informateur	CDA	1981	
Jan de Koning	30 May 1981	66	Informateur	CDA	1981	
Ed van Thijn	10 July 1981	25	Informateur	PvdA	1981	
Ed van Thijn	4 August 1981	16	Formateur	PvdA	1981	
Sjeng Kremers	4 August 1981	16	Formateur	CDA	1981	
Wilhelm Friedrich de Gaay Fortman	20 August 1981	13	Informateur	CDA	1981	
Dries van Agt	2 September 1981	9	Formateur	CDA	1981	
Cees de Galan	16 October 1981	19	Informateur	PvdA	1981	
Victor Halberstadt	16 October 1981	19	Informateur	PvdA	1981	
Piet Steenkamp	14 May 1982	12	Informateur	CDA	May–Jun 1982	
Dries van Agt	25 May 1982	4	Formateur	CDA	May–Jun 1982	
Jos van Kemenade	10 September 1982	21	Informateur	PvdA	Sep–Nov 1982	
Willem Scholten	1 October 1982	29	Informateur	CDA	Sep–Nov 1982	
Ruud Lubbers	30 October 1982	5	Formateur	CDA	Sep–Nov 1982	
Jan de Koning	23 May 1986	50	Informateur	CDA	1986	
Ruud Lubbers	11 July 1986	3	Formateur	CDA	1986	
Jan de Koning	8 September 1989	5	Informateur	CDA	1989	
Ruud Lubbers	13 September 1989	45	Informateur	CDA	1989	
Ruud Lubbers	27 October 1989	9	Formateur	CDA	1989	
Herman Tjeenk Willink	6 May 1994	8	Informateur	PvdA	1994	
Jan Vis	14 May 1994	44	Informateur	D66	1994	
Gijs van Aardenne	14 May 1994	44	Informateur	VVD	1994	
Klaas de Vries	14 May 1994	44	Informateur	PvdA	1994	
Herman Tjeenk Willink	27 June 1994	9	Informateur	PvdA	1994	
Wim Kok	6 July 1994	23	Informateur	PvdA	1994	
Wim Kok	29 July 1994	22	Formateur	PvdA	1994	
Klaas de Vries	8 May 1998	6	Informateur	PvdA	1998	
Gerrit Zalm	14 May 1998	67	Informateur	VVD	1998	
Els Borst	14 May 1998	67	Informateur	D66	1998	
Wim Kok	14 May 1998	67	Informateur	PvdA	1998	
Wim Kok	20 July 1998	14	Formateur	PvdA	1998	
Herman Tjeenk Willink	22 May 1999	18	Formateur	PvdA	1999	
Piet Hein Donner	17 May 2002	48	Informateur	CDA	2002	
Jan Peter Balkenende	4 July 2002	18	Formateur	CDA	2002	
Piet Hein Donner	24 January 2003	11	Informateur	CDA	2003	
Piet Hein Donner	5 February 2003	66	Informateur	CDA	2003	
Frans Leijnse	5 February 2003	66	Informateur	PvdA	2003	
Rein Jan Hoekstra	15 April 2003	35	Informateur	CDA	2003	
Frits Korthals Altes	15 April 2003	35	Informateur	VVD	2003	
Jan Peter Balkenende	20 May 2003	7	Formateur	CDA	2003	
Ruud Lubbers	1 July 2006	4	Informateur	CDA	2006	
Jan Peter Balkenende	5 July 2006	3	Formateur	CDA	2006	
Rein Jan Hoekstra	25 November 2006	25	Informateur	CDA	2006–2007	
Herman Wijffels	20 December 2006	51	Informateur	CDA	2006–2007	
Jan Peter Balkenende	9 February 2007	13	Formateur	CDA	2006–2007	
Uri Rosenthal	12 June 2010	14	Informateur	VVD	2010	
Herman Tjeenk Willink	26 June 2010	10	Informateur	PvdA	2010	
Uri Rosenthal	5 July 2010	16	Informateur	VVD	2010	
Jacques Wallage	5 July 2010	16	Informateur	PvdA	2010	
Ruud Lubbers	21 July 2010	14	Informateur	CDA	2010	
Ivo Opstelten	4 August 2010	32	Informateur	VVD	2010	
Herman Tjeenk Willink	7 September 2010	7	Informateur	PvdA	2010	
Ivo Opstelten	13 September 2010	25	Informateur	VVD	2010	
Mark Rutte	7 October 2010	8	Formateur	VVD	2010	
Henk Kamp	13 September 2012	6	Scout	VVD	2012	
Henk Kamp	20 September 2012	42	Informateur	VVD	2012	
Wouter Bos	20 September 2012	42	Informateur	PvdA	2012	
Mark Rutte	31 October 2012	5	Formateur	VVD	2012	
Edith Schippers	16 March 2017	11	Scout	VVD	2017	
Edith Schippers	28 March 2017	63	Informateur	VVD	2017	
Herman Tjeenk Willink	30 May 2017	29	Informateur	PvdA	2017	
Gerrit Zalm	28 June 2017	105	Informateur	VVD	2017	
Mark Rutte	12 October 2017	14	Formateur	VVD	2017	
Annemarie Jorritsma	18 March 2021	8	Scout	VVD	2021–2022	
Kajsa Ollongren	18 March 2021	8	Scout	D66	2021–2022	
Tamara van Ark	25 March 2021	8	Scout	VVD	2021–2022	
Wouter Koolmees	25 March 2021	8	Scout	D66	2021–2022	
Herman Tjeenk Willink	6 April 2021	24	Informateur	PvdA	2021–2022	
Mariëtte Hamer	12 May 2021	113	Informateur	PvdA	2021–2022	
Johan Remkes	7 September 2021	23	Informateur	VVD	2021–2022	
Johan Remkes	5 October 2021	71	Informateur	VVD	2021–2022	
Wouter Koolmees	5 October 2021	71	Informateur	D66	2021–2022	
Mark Rutte	16 December 2021	25	Formateur	VVD	2021–2022	
Gom van Strien	24 November 2023	4	Scout	PVV	2023–2024	
Ronald Plasterk	28 November 2023	14	Scout	PvdA	2023–2024	
Ronald Plasterk	13 December 2023	62	Informateur	PvdA	2023–2024	
Kim Putters	14 February 2024	30	Informateur	PvdA	2023–2024	
Elbert Dijkgraaf	20 March 2024	58	Informateur	SGP	2023–2024	
Richard van Zwol	20 March 2024	58	Informateur	CDA	2023–2024	
Richard van Zwol	22 May 2024	41	Formateur	CDA	2023–2024	
Wouter Koolmees	4 November 2025	8	Scout	D66	2025–2026	
Hans Wijers	13 November 2025	2	Informateur	D66	2025–2026	
Sybrand Buma	13 November 2025	28	Informateur	CDA	2025–2026	
Rianne Letschert	10 December 2025	52	Informateur	D66	2025–2026	
Rob Jetten	3 February 2026	19	Formateur	D66	2025–2026	

== See also ==
- List of Dutch cabinet formations
