= List of Dutch cabinet formations =

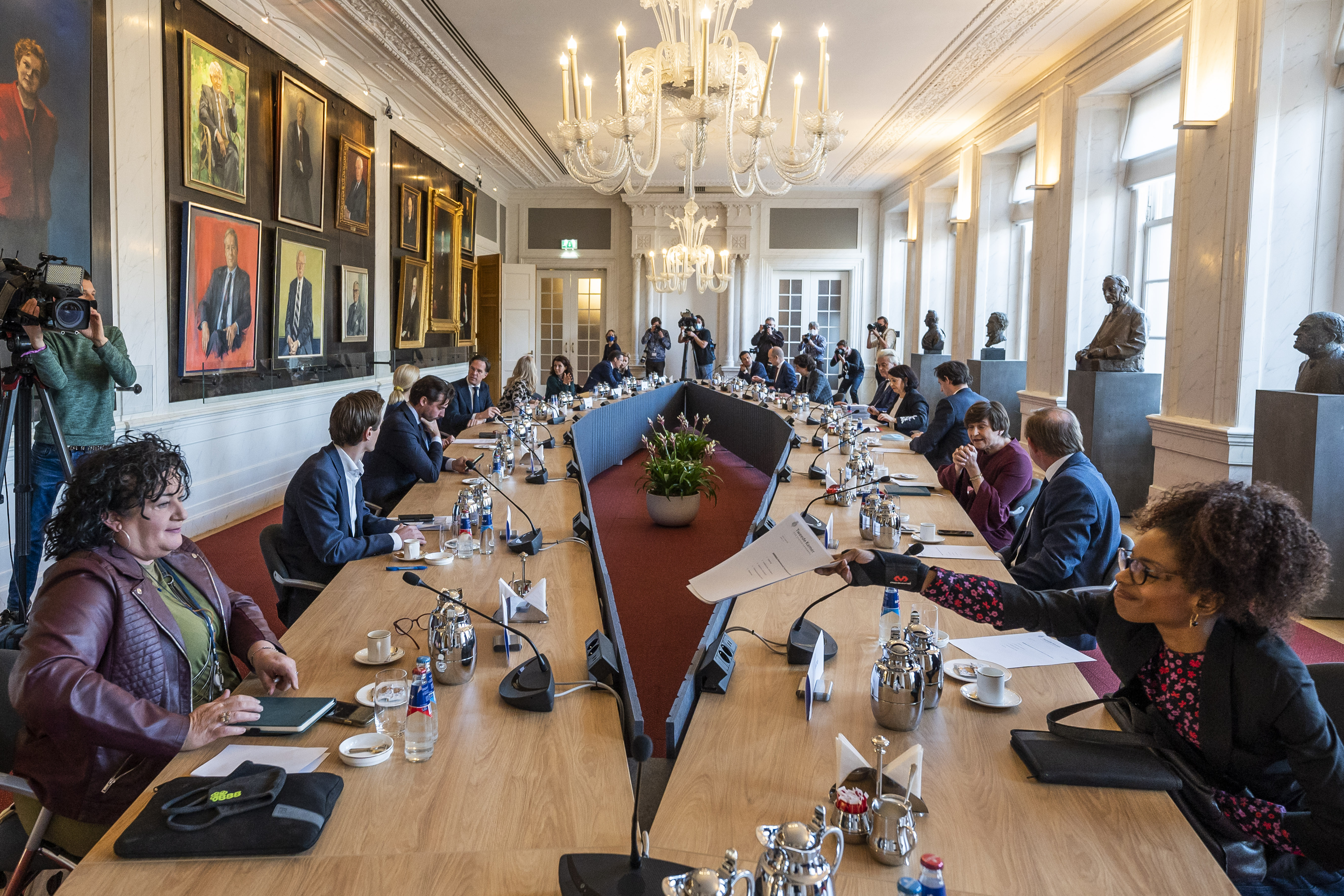
Expected parliamentary leaders meeting the day after the election to appoint a scout during the 2021–2022 cabinet formation.

This is a list of Dutch cabinet formations. This includes attempts to form or continue with a cabinet after a cabinet crisis.

In most cases, a cabinet formation is started after a general election after which a majority cabinet is sought. In some cases it results in a minority cabinet. After the fall of a cabinet, a new start can be made with part of the fallen cabinet. Then there may be a rump cabinet, which is also often a minority cabinet.

== List ==
| Formation | Start (Note: In the case of a regular cabinet formation, it is the day after the election. In other cases, it is generally the day after a cabinet requested dismissal.) | End (Note: In the case of cabinet formations that lead to a new cabinet, this is the day when the new cabinet is appointed and/or sworn in) | Length (days) (Note: Calculated from the day after the general election until the day when the cabinet is sworn in. Not all sources use the same starting point.) | Cabinet | Ref. |
|---|---|---|---|---|---|
| 1848 | 16 March 1848 | 25 March 1848 | 10 | Schimmelpenninck | |
| 1848 | 16 March 1848 | 25 March 1848 | 10 | De Kempenaer-Donker Curtius (Note: The De Kempenaer-Donker Curtius cabinet succeeded the preceding cabinet in 1848 without a cabinet formation) | |
| 1849 | 19 September 1849 | 1 November 1849 | 44 | Thorbecke I | |
| 1853 | 16 April 1853 | 19 April 1853 | 4 | Van Hall/Donker Curtius | |
| 1856 | 1 June 1856 | 1 July 1856 | 47 | Van der Brugghen | |
| 1858 | 3 March 1858 | 18 March 1858 | 16 | Rochussen | |
| 1860 | 17 February 1860 | 23 February 1860 | 7 | Van Hall/Van Heemstra | |
| 1861 | 16 February 1861 | 14 March 1861 | 27 | Van Zuylen van Nijevelt/Van Heemstra | |
| 1861–1862 | 18 December 1861 (Note: The Van Zuylen van Nijevelt/Van Heemstra cabinet resigned on 17 December 1861.) | 1 February 1862 | 46 | Thorbecke II | |
| Jan–Feb 1866 | 29 January 1866 | 10 February 1866 | 13 | Fransen van de Putte | |
| May–Jun 1866 | 24 May 1866 | 1 June 1866 | 9 | Van Zuylen van Nijevelt | |
| 1868 | 17 April 1868 | 4 June 1868 | 49 | Van Bosse/Fock | |
| 1870–1871 | 24 November 1870 | 4 January 1871 | 42 | Thorbecke III | |
| 1872 | 25 June 1872 | 6 July 1872 | 12 | De Vries/Fransen van de Putte | |
| 1874 | 14 July 1874 | 27 August 1874 | 45 | Heemskerk/Van Lynden van Sandenburg | |
| 1877 | 16 October 1877 | 3 November 1877 | 19 | Kappeyne van de Coppello | |
| 1879 | 12 July 1879 | 20 August 1879 | 40 | Van Lynden van Sandenburg | |
| 1882 | 10 May 1882 | 12 August 1882 | 95 | Van Lynden van Sandenburg | |
| 1883 | 4 March 1883 | 23 April 1883 | 51 | J. Heemskerk | |
| 1888 | 28 March 1888 | 21 April 1888 | 25 | Mackay | |
| 1891 | 24 June 1891 | 21 August 1891 | 58 | Van Tienhoven | |
| 1894 | 25 April 1894 | 9 May 1894 | 15 | Röell | |
| 1897 | 26 June 1897 | 27 July 1897 | 32 | Pierson | |
| 1901 | 28 June 1901 | 1 August 1901 | 35 | Kuyper | |
| 1905 | 29 June 1905 | 17 August 1905 | 50 | De Meester | |
| 1907 | 12 February 1907 | 21 March 1907 | 38 | De Meester | |
| 1907–1908 | 25 December 1907 | 12 February 1908 | 50 | T. Heemskerk | |
| 1913 | 26 June 1913 | 29 August 1913 | 65 | Cort van der Linden | |
| 1918 | 4 July 1918 | 9 September 1918 | 68 | Ruijs de Beerenbrouck I | |
| 1921 | 22 June 1921 | 26 July 1921 | 35 | Ruijs de Beerenbrouck I | |
| 1922 | 6 July 1922 | 18 September 1922 | 75 | Ruijs de Beerenbrouck II | |
| 1923–1924 | 26 October 1923 | 7 January 1924 | 73 | Ruijs de Beerenbrouck II | |
| 1925 | 2 July 1925 | 4 August 1925 | 34 | Colijn I | |
| 1925–1926 | 24 November 1925 | 8 March 1926 | 105 | De Geer I | |
| 1929 | 3 July 1929 | 10 August 1929 | 39 | Ruijs de Beerenbrouck III | |
| 1933 | 27 April 1933 | 26 May 1933 | 30 | Colijn II | |
| 1935 | 26 July 1935 | 31 July 1935 | 6 | Colijn III | |
| 1937 | 27 May 1937 | 24 June 1937 | 29 | Colijn IV | |
| Jun–Jul 1939 | 30 June 1939 | 25 July 1939 | 26 | Colijn V | |
| Aug 1939 | 4 August 1939 | 10 August 1939 | 7 | De Geer II | |
| 1940 | 28 August 1940 | 3 September 1940 | 7 | Gerbrandy I | |
| 1941 | 1 July 1941 | 27 July 1941 | 27 | Gerbrandy II | |
| Feb 1945 | 22 January 1945 | 23 February 1945 | 33 | Gerbrandy III | |
| May–Jun 1945 | 9 May 1945 | 24 June 1945 | 47 | Schermerhorn-Drees | |
| 1946 | 18 May 1946 | 3 July 1946 | 47 | Beel I | |
| 1948 | 8 July 1948 | 7 August 1948 | 31 | Drees-Van Schaik | |
| 1951 | 29 January 1951 | 15 March 1951 | 44 | Drees I | |
| 1952 | 26 June 1952 | 2 September 1952 | 69 | Drees II | |
| 1955 | 18 May 1955 | 3 June 1955 | 17 | Drees II | |
| 1956 | 14 June 1956 | 13 October 1956 | 121 | Drees III | |
| 1958 | 13 December 1958 | 22 December 1958 | 10 | Beel II (Note: Rump cabinet.) | |
| 1959 | 13 March 1959 | 19 May 1959 | 67 | De Quay | |
| 1960–1961 | 24 December 1960 | 2 January 1961 | 10 | De Quay | |
| 1963 | 16 May 1963 | 24 July 1963 | 70 | Marijnen | |
| 1965 | 28 February 1965 | 14 April 1965 | 46 | Cals | |
| 1966 | 18 October 1966 | 22 November 1966 | 35 | Zijlstra | |
| 1967 | 16 February 1967 | 5 April 1967 | 49 | De Jong | |
| 1971 | 29 April 1971 | 6 July 1971 | 69 | Biesheuvel I | |
| 1972 | 19 July 1972 | 9 August 1972 | 11 | Biesheuvel II | |
| 1972–1973 | 30 November 1972 | 11 May 1973 | 163 | Den Uyl | |
| 1977 | 26 May 1977 | 19 December 1977 | 208 | Van Agt I | |
| 1981 | 27 May 1981 | 11 September 1981 | 108 | Van Agt II | |
| 1981 | 16 October 1981 | 4 November 1981 | 19 | Van Agt II | |
| May–Jun 1982 | 14 May 1982 | 29 May 1982 | 17 | Van Agt III | |
| Sep–Nov 1982 | 9 September 1982 | 4 November 1982 | 57 | Lubbers I | |
| 1986 | 22 May 1986 | 14 July 1986 | 54 | Lubbers II | |
| 1989 | 7 September 1989 | 7 November 1989 | 62 | Lubbers III | |
| 1994 | 4 May 1994 | 22 August 1994 | 111 | Kok I | |
| 1998 | 6 May 1998 | 3 August 1998 | 89 | Kok II | |
| 1999 | 20 May 1999 | 8 June 1999 | 20 | Kok II | |
| 2002 | 16 May 2002 | 22 July 2002 | 68 | Balkenende I | |
| 2003 | 23 January 2003 | 27 May 2003 | 122 | Balkenende II | |
| 2006 | 30 June 2006 | 7 July 2006 | 7 | Balkenende III | |
| 2006–2007 | 23 November 2006 | 22 February 2007 | 90 | Balkenende IV | |
| 2010 | 10 June 2010 | 14 October 2010 | 127 | Rutte I | |
| 2012 | 13 September 2012 | 5 November 2012 | 54 | Rutte II | |
| 2017 | 16 March 2017 | 26 October 2017 | 225 | Rutte III | |
| 2021–2022 | 18 March 2021 | 10 January 2022 | 299 | Rutte IV | |
| 2023–2024 | 23 November 2023 | 2 July 2024 | 223 | Schoof | |
| 2025–2026 | 30 October 2025 | 23 February 2026 | 117 | Jetten | |

== See also ==
- List of cabinets of the Netherlands
- List of Dutch (in)formateurs and scouts
