= 2021–2022 Dutch cabinet formation =

Formation of the fourth Rutte cabinet

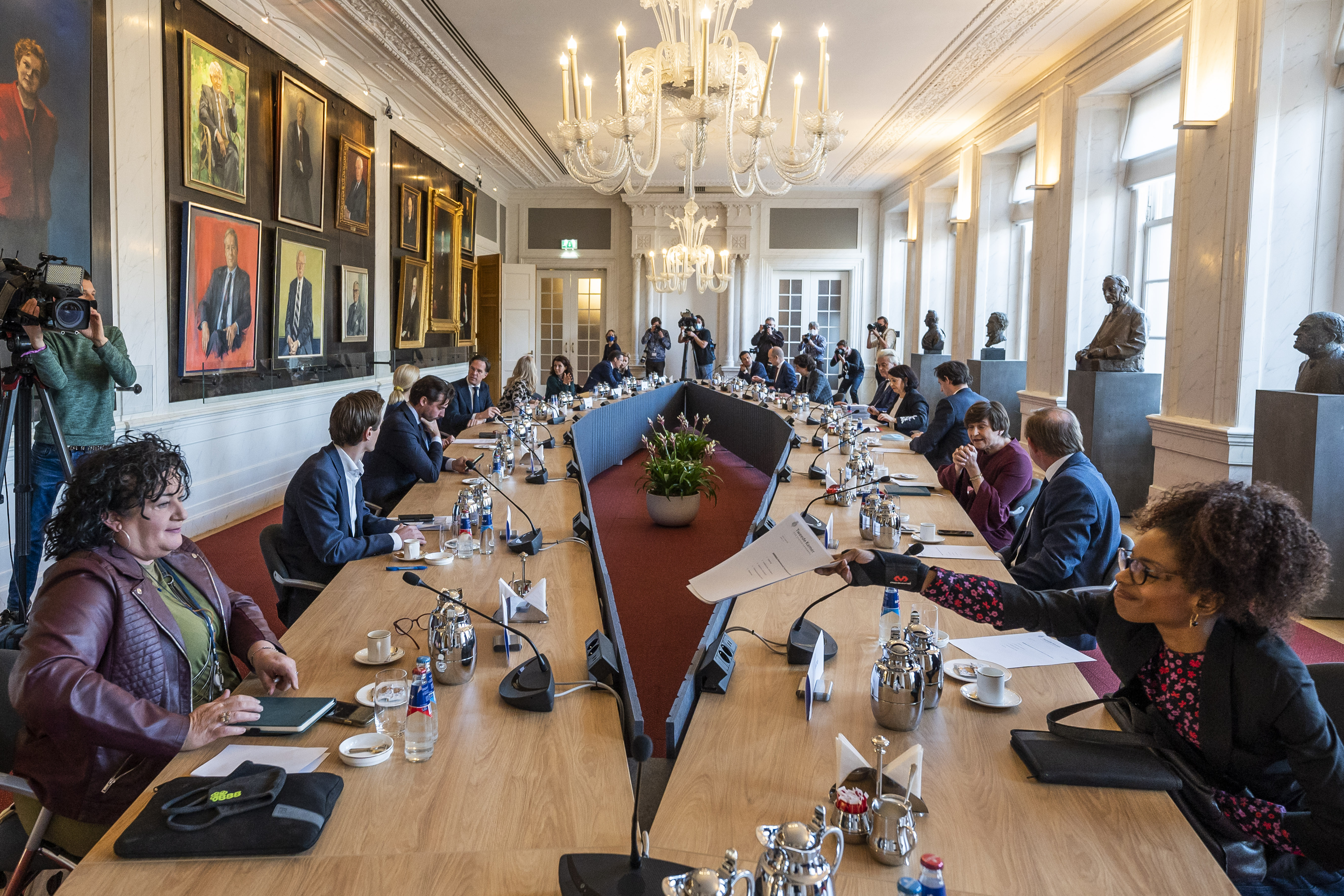
Expected parliamentary leaders meeting the day after the election to discuss the formation

Following the Dutch general election on 17 March 2021, a cabinet formation led to the establishment of the fourth Rutte cabinet in 2022. The coalition included the People's Party for Freedom and Democracy (VVD), Democrats 66 (D66), Christian Democratic Appeal (CDA) and Christian Union (CU), the same parties from the preceding third Rutte cabinet. This formation process, lasting 299 days, was the longest formation in Dutch history.

At the start of the formation, notes from the scouts, which included the text "position Omtzigt, function elsewhere", became public. It was revealed that VVD leader and demissionary prime minister Mark Rutte had discussed CDA MP Pieter Omtzigt, despite initially denying it. This revelation led to distrust in Rutte among potential coalition partners. Subsequently, informateur Herman Tjeenk Willink was tasked with exploring ways to restore confidence and facilitate the formation of a new cabinet.

In the subsequent months, informateur Mariëtte Hamer sought a majority coalition comprising a combination of VVD, D66, CDA, PvdA, GroenLinks (GL) and CU. However, without substantive negotiations, blockades were put up between these parties. Informateur Johan Remkes then explored a minority coalition or an extra-parliamentary cabinet, but these efforts also failed. Due to the deadlock, D66 lifted its blockade against a majority coalition with the CU. Led by informateurs Remkes and Wouter Koolmees, VVD, CDA, D66, and CU negotiated and presented a coalition agreement on 15 December 2021. Under formateur Rutte, ministers were selected and sworn in on 10 January 2022.

== Background ==
The third Rutte cabinet resigned in January 2021 following a report on the Dutch childcare benefits scandal. One of the driving forces behind the exposure of the scandal was CDA MP Pieter Omtzigt. Omtzigt ran in the CDA leadership election but narrowly lost to Hugo de Jonge and was subsequently placed second on the party's candidacy list. When De Jonge stepped down, the party board chose Wopke Hoekstra as party leader over Omtzigt. The opposition he had encountered led to a burn-out, as a result of which Omtzigt took leave before the elections without being replaced.

As the election of March 2021 took place during the COVID-19 pandemic, parties wanted a short cabinet formation. Leader of the People's Party for Freedom and Democracy (VVD) Mark Rutte even suggested dividing the formation into two parts, with parties first collectively working on a recovery plan for the Covid crisis.

During the campaign, some parties expressed preferences for coalition partners. The Christian Democratic Appeal (CDA) and VVD ruled out cooperation with the radical-right Party for Freedom (PVV) and Forum for Democracy (FvD). The VVD explicitly indicated a desire to govern with the CDA. GroenLinks proposed that a coalition with D66 and PvdA, but both parties rejected this. GroenLinks and PvdA stated they would only join a cabinet together or with the Socialist Party (SP). Unlike previous elections, the SP did not rule out cooperating with the VVD and did not impose another left-wing party in the cabinet as a condition. After appointing Esther Ouwehand as leader, Party for the Animals (PvdD) was open to joining a cabinet. Meanwhile, D66 and Christian Union highlighted their differences on medical-ethical issues, making their cooperation unlikely.

=== Election results ===
Composition of the newly installed House of Representatives throughout the cabinet formation: BIJ1: 1 Volt: 3 Denk: 3 Den Haan (ex-50+): 1 GL: 8 SP: 9 PvdD: 6 PvdA: 9 D66: 24 CU: 5 SGP: 3 VVD: 34 CDA: 14 Omtzigt (ex-CDA): 1 BBB: 1 JA21: 3 FvD: 5 Groep Van Haga (ex-FvD): 3 PVV: 17

In the election, the liberal parties VVD and D66 both gained seats, with D66 becoming the second-largest party and VVD maintaining its position as the largest party. This was the first time since the 1998 election that a sitting cabinet won seats. FvD gained the most seats, growing from two to eight seats. PvdD was the only other sitting party that managed to grow, with one seat. Four new parties (Volt, JA21, BIJ1 and Farmer–Citizen Movement (BBB)) joined parliament. Seventeen parties were elected, the highest number since 1918. Because of this fragmentation, a majority cabinet had to consist of at least four parties. The radical right (JA21, PVV, and FvD) achieved their best result ever with 28 seats, while traditional left parties (GroenLinks, PvdA, and SP) were at a historic low with a combined 26 seats.

== Scouts Jorritsma and Ollongren ==
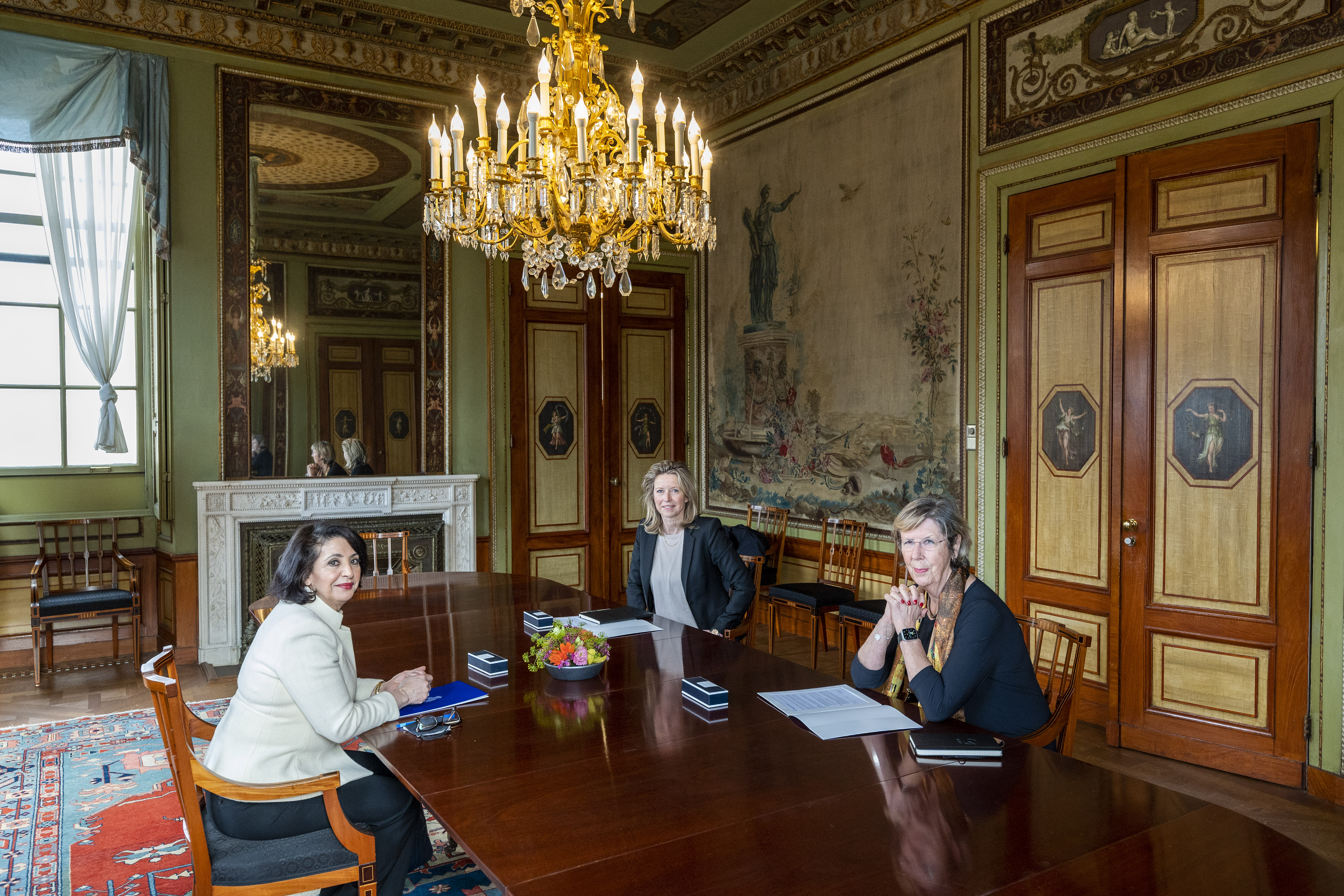
Scouts Annemarie Jorritsma (VVD) and Kajsa Ollongren (D66) receiving their assignment from speaker of the House Khadija Arib

On 18 March, the expected seventeen parliamentary leaders met to discuss the formation, and to select a scout to investigate which coalitions would be possible. In addition to the custom that the largest party to provides the scout, D66 insisted on a second scout from their party. Subsequently, VVD Senate leader Annemarie Jorritsma and D66 Minister of the Interior and Kingdom Relations Kajsa Ollongren were appointed as scouts. On 22 and 23 March the scouts interviewed expected parliamentary leaders on their coalition preferences.

=== Coalition preferences ===
Ranking of coalition preferences among voters
#	EenVandaag (18 March 2021)	Seats
1	VVD + D66 + CDA + ChristianUnion	78
2	VVD + D66 + CDA + Volt	76
3	VVD + D66 + CDA + PvdA	82
4	VVD + PVV + CDA + FvD + JA21	77
5	VVD + D66 + PvdA + SP + GroenLinks	84
#	Peil.nl (28 March 2021)	Seats
1	VVD + D66 + CDA + JA21 (Note: Ranked sixth out of ten for D66-voters.)	76
2	VVD + D66 + PvdA + SP + GroenLinks (Note: Ranked last out of ten for VVD-voters.)	84
3	VVD + CDA + D66 + PVV	90
4	VVD + D66 + CDA + ChristianUnion	78
5	VVD + D66 + CDA + PvdA	82

VVD and D66 had different coalition preferences. VVD leader Mark Rutte wanted to "look seriously" at a center-right coalition with D66, CDA and JA21. However, D66-leader Kaag found collaboration with JA21 "difficult to imagine" and preferred a progressive coalition, without naming parties. Collaboration with one of the left-wing progressive parties, on the other hand, was only an option for Rutte after considering CU.

A number of parties were open to cabinet participation. PVV leader Geert Wilders said that a right-wing coalition of VVD, CDA, PVV, FvD and JA21 should be investigated, but this was ruled out by VVD. JA21-leader Joost Eerdmans supported Rutte's wish to form a right-wing cabinet of VVD, D66, CDA and JA21. Lilianne Ploumen said PvdA was open to cabinet participation, provided that SP or GroenLinks also joined. GroenLinks-leader Klaver was also open to government participation in an "as progressive as possible cabinet". PvdD leader Esther Ouwehand also argued for a cabinet that was as green and progressive as possible.

Most other parties were hesitant about joining a cabinet at this stage for various reasons. CDA-leader Wopke Hoekstra said he had no desire to join a "liberal block", referring to VVD and D66. As the tenth political group in terms of seats, CU-leader Gert-Jan Segers considered it strange if negotiations started with CU. SP-leader Lilian Marijnissen thought that coalition participation was not obvious given the electoral defeat. Although FvD leader Thierry Baudet indicated on election evening that cabinet participation was possible, he no longer expected this after talking to the scouts. Although there was speculation about cabinet participation by newcomer Volt, party leader Laurens Dassen was cautious about this. The other groups, with three or fewer seats, all indicated that cabinet participation was not an option for them.

The scouts also spoke with the president of the Senate, Jan Anthonie Bruijn. He indicated that a majority in the Senate was 'preferable', but added that in recent years it had become apparent that a government can still succeed in realizing its legislative agenda in the absence of such a majority. Of the proposed coalitions, only the combination of VVD, D66, CDA, PvdA and GroenLinks had a majority in the Senate.

=== "Position Omtzigt, function elsewhere" ===
The notes that were accidentally photographed including the text "position Omtzigt, function elsewhere"

From the start, the scouts considered CDA pivotal within the formation. According to them, Omtzigt's position was a circumstance that could hinder coalition participation. They brought this up in a conversation with speaker of the House of Representatives Khadija Arib on 19 March. They indicated that they found the deadline of 30 March unfeasible. They thought it would be best to wait until the official results of the elections would be known on 26 March, which would show whether Omtzigt had more preference votes than party leader Hoekstra (which turned out not to be the case). Jorritsma called Omtzigt's position a problem for coalition formation and 'untenable'. Arib did not agree to the request, because she thought it was inappropriate to talk about people in the scouting phase. The content of this conversation was not mentioned in the scouts' final report and only revealed a year and a half after the formation.

On 25 March, Rutte and Kaag were due to hold a second meeting with the scouts separately. However, after arriving at Binnenhof, where the meetings were to take place, Ollongren learned that she had tested positive for COVID-19 and had to go into quarantine. On the way to her car, Ollongren's notes about the formation were photographed by an ANP photographer. Among other things, it read: "position Omtzigt, function elsewhere" (Dutch: "positie Omtzigt, functie elders"). An hour and a half after the notes were leaked, Jorritsma and Ollongren resigned as scouts.

Several party leaders insisted on a debate about the leaked notes. Also on behalf of Kaag, Rutte indicated that same day that neither of them had said anything about Omtzigt in their conversations. In the same interview, Rutte indicated that the scouts could not be summoned for debate, because they had already resigned. Arib therefore asked Jorritsma and Ollongren as private persons to explain the notes, to which both agreed.

=== 1 April debate ===
Before the debate on April 1, all discussion reports were made public. This showed that Rutte and the scouts had discussed Omtzigt, specifically about a possible ministership. After the announcement, Ollongren planned to resign as minister that same day. When Rutte heard this through Jorritsma, he called Ollongren to advise against it. Ollongren then decided to wait for the debate. It was agreed with Kaag that the D66 faction would support a motion of no confidence against her.

However, during the debate the focus was mainly on Rutte. He indicated that he had no memory of discussing Omtzigt. After questions from Baudet, it also turned out that Rutte had heard "via-via" about the contents of the meeting reports several hours before the other party leaders. Rutte did not want to reveal who had called him about this. A motion of no confidence against Rutte as prime minister was rejected along the lines of the demissionary cabinet. All parties except the VVD supported a motion of censure by coalition parties CDA and D66 against Rutte as faction leader.

After the debate and the vote, SP and CU ruled out cooperation with VVD as long as Rutte was in charge. The youth parties of D66, CDA, PvdA, PvdD, GL and DENK encouraged their parent parties to do the same. Polls immediately after the debate also showed that 60% of voters did not want their party to enter into a coalition with VVD led by Rutte.

== Scouts Van Ark and Koolmees ==
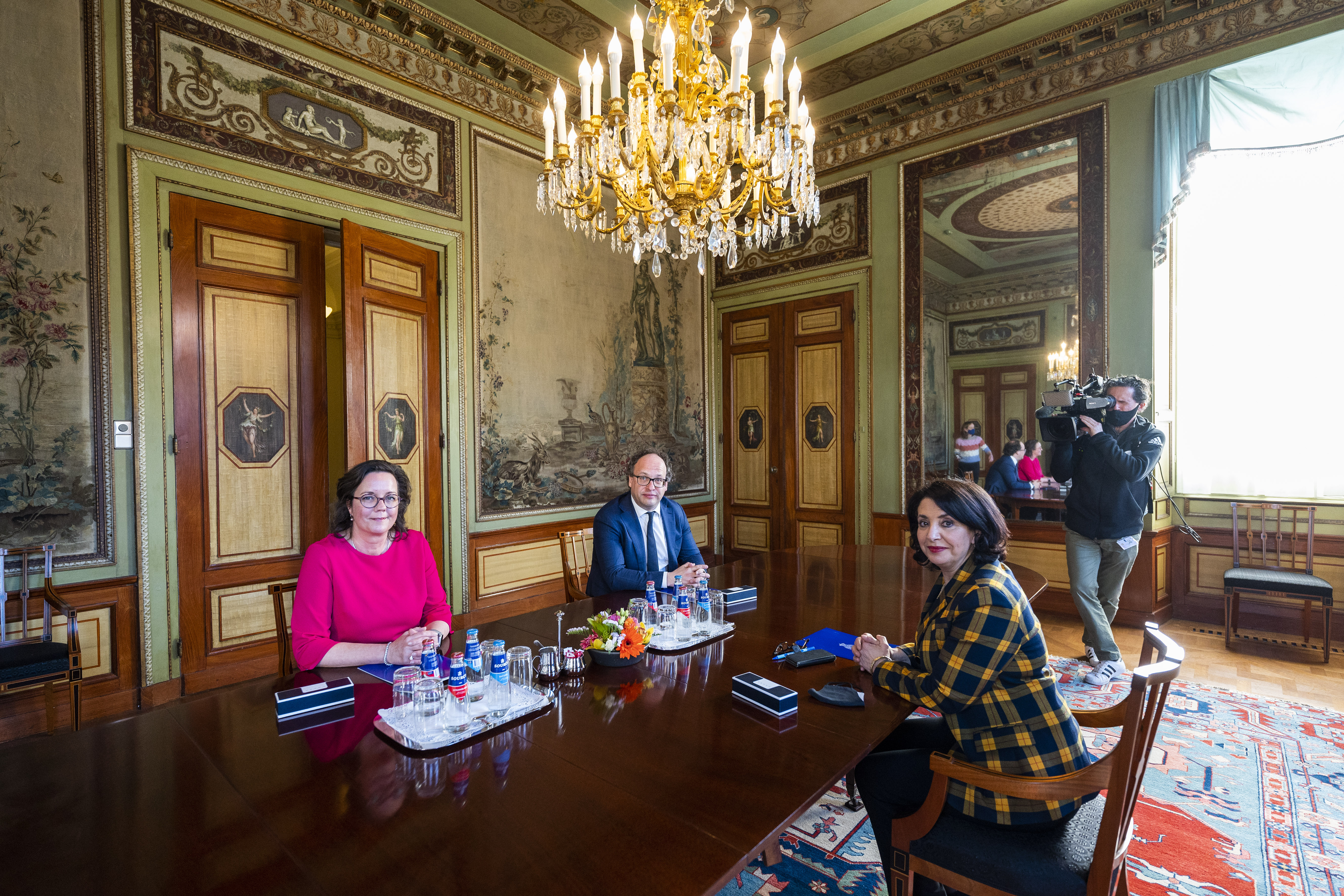
Scouts Tamara van Ark (VVD) and Wouter Koolmees (D66) receiving their assignment from speaker of the House Khadija Arib

After Ollongren and Jorritsma resigned, the ministers Tamara van Ark (VVD) and Wouter Koolmees (D66) were appointed as scouts on 25 March. At the request of House of Representatives, they delayed meetings until after the debate with the scouts who had resigned. During this debate, however, the House passed a motion to request a new independent scout. A day later on 2 April, Koolmees and Van Ark officially resigned.

== Informateur Tjeenk Willink ==
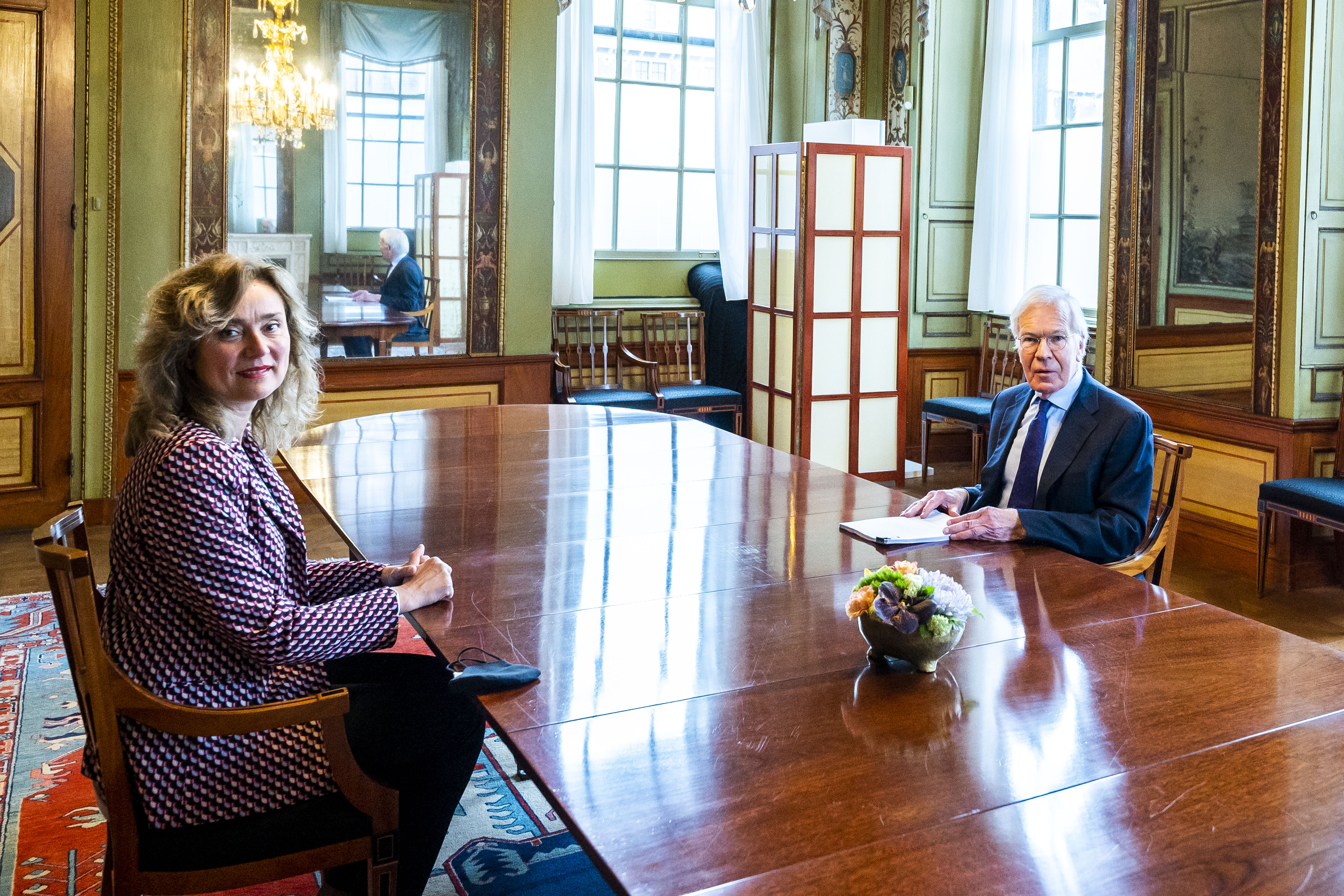
Informateur Herman Tjeenk Willink (PvdA) receiving his assignment from speaker of the House Vera Bergkamp (who succeeded Arib in that role on 7 April)

Herman Tjeenk Willink was appointed informateur for three weeks on 6 April, a role he had fulfilled five times before. In the first week he held talks with the parliamentary leaders, this time the smaller parties first. As a period of rest, he did not invite parliamentary leaders in the second week, but among others Nationale Ombudsman Reinier van Zutphen and chair of the Social and Economic Council Mariëtte Hamer. In the weekend, Segers retracted his exclusion of cooperation with Rutte, but nevertheless preferred opposition. In the invitation to parliamentary leaders for meetings in the third week, Tjeenk Willink indicated that more time had to be taken for the formation, but that a recovery plan for the corona crisis had to be worked out quickly. Farid Azarkan (DENK), Wilders and Van der Plas were critical of this approach, which no longer was about the (lack of) trust in Rutte.

Mutual trust was again under pressure after, according to RTL Nieuws, a Council of Ministers decided at the end of 2019 to deliberately provide the House of Representatives with incomplete information about the childcare benefits scandal. Parliamentary leaders Rutte, Kaag and Hoekstra had attended the Council of Ministers as ministers. Rutte indicated that "nothing inappropriate" had happened, and the Council of Ministers decided to release the minutes. During the debate on 29 April, the demissionary cabinet survived a motion of no confidence.

Tjeenk Willink had decided to wait until after this debate to present his final report, which he handed over on 30 April. In his report he indicated that the substantive formation could start. According to Tjeenk Willink, only BIJ1, PVV and SP explicitly ruled out governing with Rutte. Polls published around the time of the debate with Tjeenk Willink on 12 May also showed that fewer voters ruled out a coalition with Rutte.

== Informateur Hamer ==
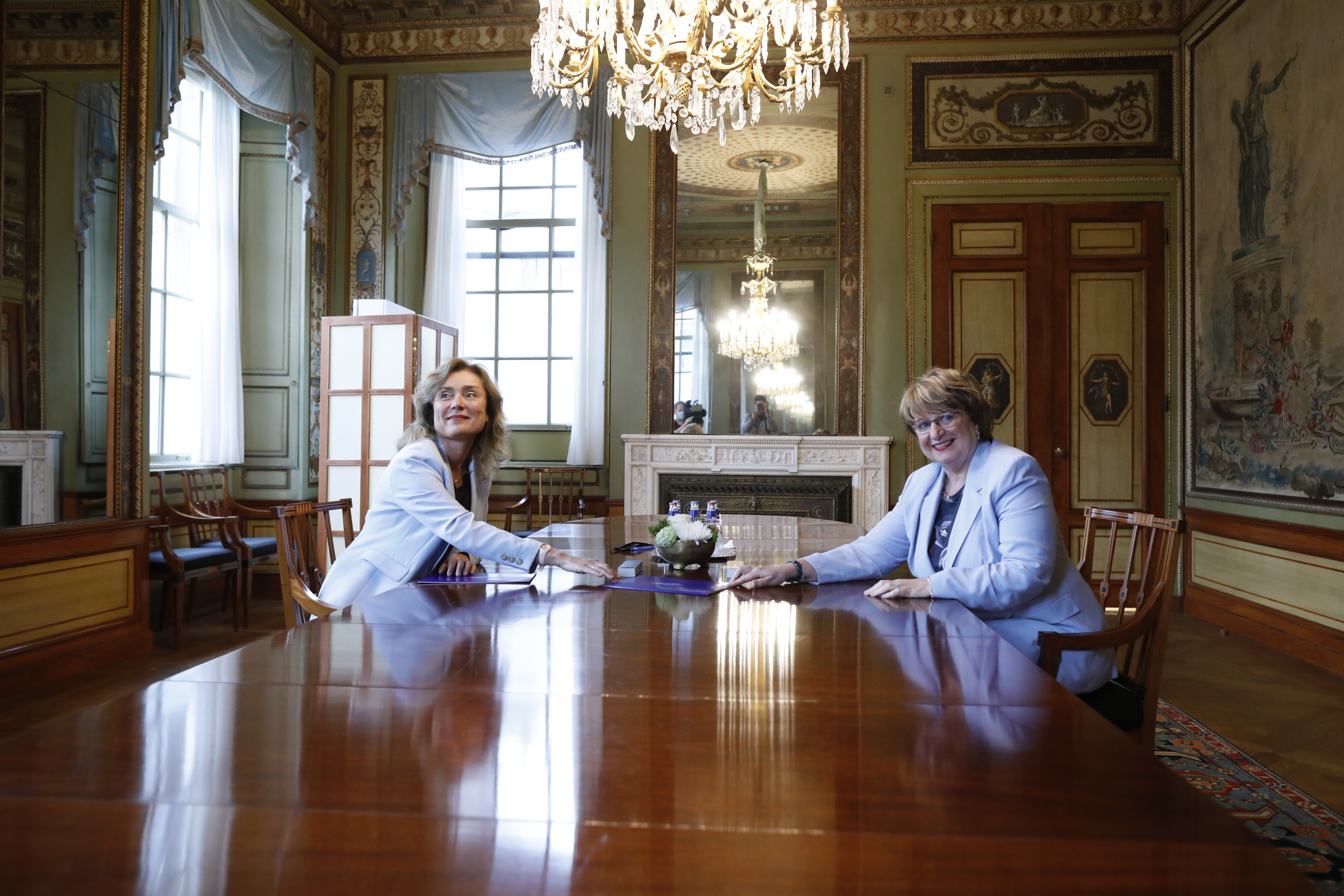
Informateur Mariëtte Hamer (PvdA) receiving her assignment from speaker of the House Vera Bergkamp

=== Scouting ===
After the debate with Tjeenk Willink on 12 May, SER chairwoman Mariëtte Hamer was nominated as informateur by Kaag and Rutte, a decision approved by the House of Representatives. Her primary task was to focus on recovery and transition policy following the COVID-19 crisis. Only after addressing this did she need to work on forming a coalition government, according to the motion.

Like her predecessors, she invited the – after a split 18 – parliamentary leaders for a meeting on 17 and 18 May. Although the discussions were largely substantive, they were also asked about coalition preferences. Kaag expressed for the first time a preference for a specific coalition, consisting of VVD, CDA, D66, PvdA and GL. In the week of 24 May, Hamer held discussions grouped around themes suggested by the parties. That same week, Omtzigt was replaced for four months, which made it easier for the CDA to negotiate with Rutte, according to NRC Handelsblad.

Between the discussions with the group leaders, Hamer had discussions with a total of 28 representatives on specific topics. These included youth organisations, representatives of the cultural sector and mayors.

In the last week of her assignment, Hamer focused on the search for a coalition. That week, Hamer received the parliamentary leaders of VVD, D66, CDA, PvdA, GL and CU in varying combinations. Hoekstra reacted reluctantly to Kaag's coalition preference for VVD, D66 and CDA, supplemented by two left-wing parties PvdA and GL. Voters of VVD and CDA also reacted negatively to this coalition in opinion polls. Ploumen and Klaver, however, repeated that they would only join a cabinet together. The other option discussed, continuation of the sitting coalition, was held off by Segers. At the end of the week, Hamer indicated that she needed more time than the original 6 June deadline. She said there were not many substantive differences, but the parties nevertheless did not want to work together in a cabinet.

The following week, Hamer brought the conflicting parties together again, but again this did not lead to a possible coalition. On 10 June, an internal document was leaked in which Omtzigt criticized his party, saying he felt unsafe. As a result of the leak, Omtzigt indicated two days later that he would leave the CDA and continue as an independent MP. The coalitions of VVD, D66 and CDA, supplemented by JA21 or Volt, previously mentioned by Hoekstra, would therefore no longer have a majority. At the end of that week, Hamer concluded that the formation was at an impasse. During a joint conversation with VVD, D66, CDA, PvdA, GL and CU, she urged the parties to come to a breakthrough during the weekend.

=== Start of coalition agreement between VVD and D66 ===
When the impasse was not broken after this weekend, Hamer suggested that Kaag and Rutte write the basis of a coalition agreement together, which other parties could then join at a later stage. On 22 June she presented her final report with that recommendation. During the debate on Hamer's report on 23 June, the House agreed to her proposal. In the following weeks, representatives of VVD and D66, led by Hamer, negotiated in silence. VVD MPs Sophie Hermans and Mark Harbers negotiated with their D66 colleagues Rob Jetten and Steven van Weyenberg.

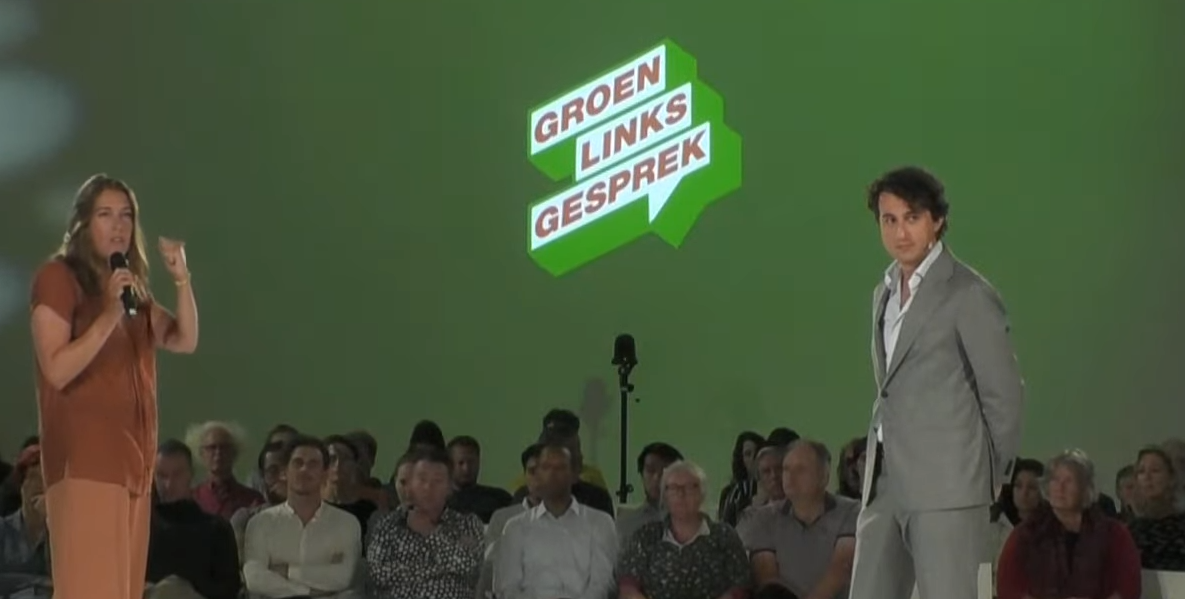
GroenLinks MPs Corinne Ellemeet and Jesse Klaver at a meeting with members, discussing the cooperation with the Labour Party.

On 17 August, a day after Kaag reiterated her opposition to cooperation with the ChristianUnion in Algemeen Dagblad, the VVD/D66 document was shared with CDA, PvdA, GroenLinks and ChristianUnion. The CDA, PvdA, and GroenLinks saw sufficient starting points, while the ChristianUnion noted it was "clearly written by two liberal parties." On 20 August, Ploumen and Klaver announced they wanted to negotiate as one delegation. Party members later supported this approach and did not rule out governing with the VVD. However, VVD and CDA preferred negotiating with one party and found a five-party coalition with PvdA and GroenLinks together unlikely.

On 2 September, Hamer presented her final report. In it she recommended that a new informateur look for a minority coalition. During the HJ Schoo lecture on 6 September, Kaag made a number of critical statements about politicians who "drink coffee, manage relationships, play games in private with party-political emotion", who "arrange and hustle without vision" and who "to shout loudly how amazingly cool our 'little country' is." Although she did not mention anyone by name, it was widely assumed that she was referring to Rutte. During the debate a day later with Hamer, Kaag denied that this was only about Rutte.

== Informateur Remkes ==
During the last debate with Hamer, a VVD motion was passed to appoint Johan Remkes as informateur. His assignment was to explore a minority coalition, in line with the recommendation of Hamer.

On 15 September, the House of Representatives debated the evacuation from Afghanistan, leading to motions of censure against Foreign Affairs Minister Sigrid Kaag and Defense Minister Ank Bijleveld (CDA). These motions were supported by the entire opposition and CU. Kaag resigned but remained party leader and negotiator for the formation. Bijleveld initially stayed but resigned the next day due to political pressure. From 18-19 September, VVD, D66, and CDA negotiators met with Remkes at the De Zwaluwenberg estate in Hilversum, but no breakthrough was achieved, partly due to the previous week's events.

In an effort to convince D66 to join a minority cabinet, MPs Mark Harbers (VVD), Jaco Geurts and Henri Bontenbal (CDA) collaboratively drafted a coalition agreement. This occurred during the general debates (22-24 September), when the formation process was officially paused. The existence and contents of this draft only became public knowledge in November 2021, after Segers accidentally left the document on a train and it ended up with de Volkskrant.

On 26 September, a rapprochement between ChristianUnion and D66 seemed possible, with Kaag indicating a willingness to "lift our political blockade". The next day, negotiators from VVD, CDA, and D66 met with Remkes for over ten hours. According to De Telegraaf, Remkes was frustrated with Kaag's cryptic statements. That evening, two D66 spokespersons and MP Sjoerd Sjoerdsma suggested to the media that Remkes had been "confused" and had "some drink", leading to significant criticism. Kaag was subsequently forced to apologize.

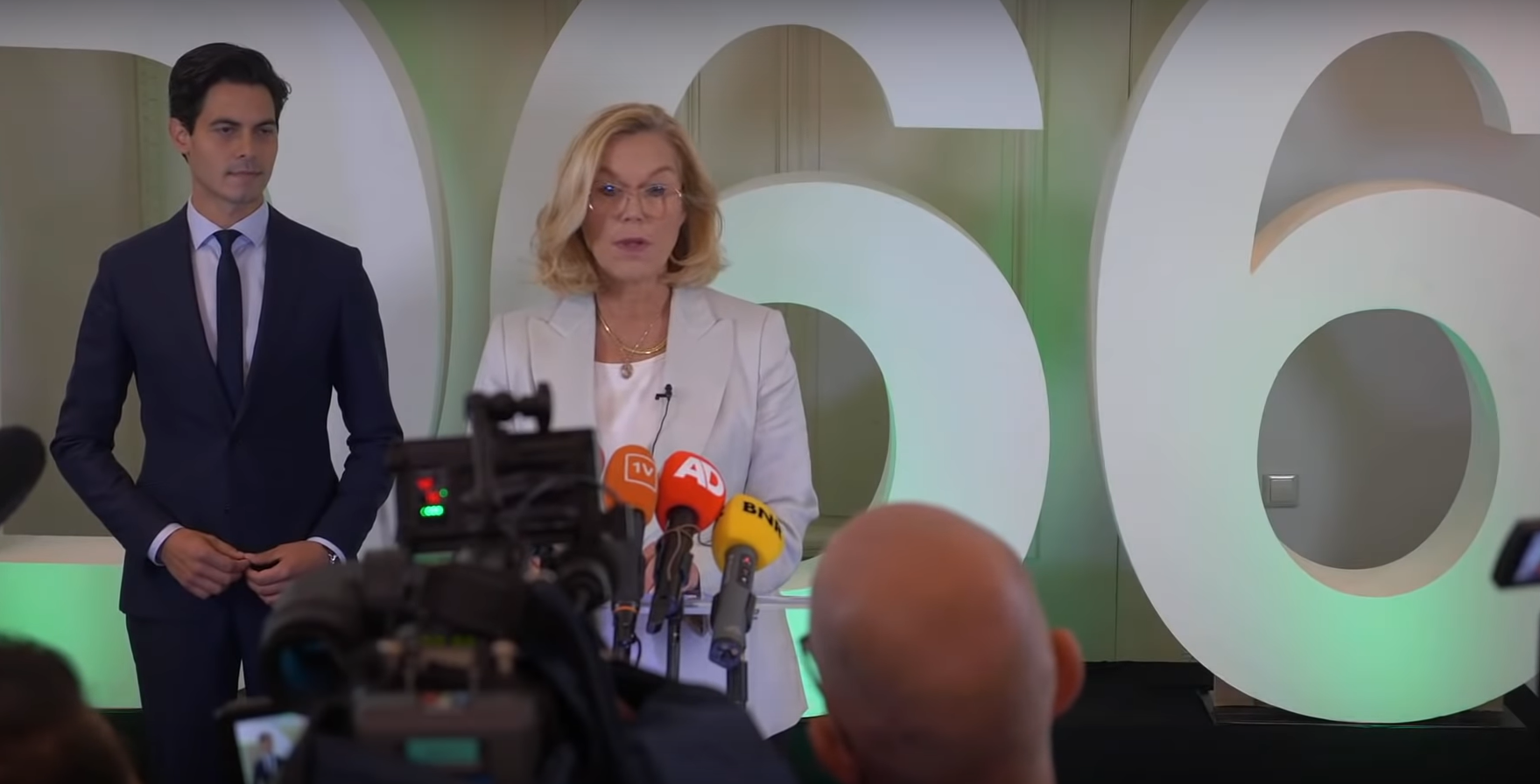
Sigrid Kaag, accompanied by Rob Jetten, announcing on 30 September that D66 is willing to negotiate with ChristianUnion.

On 29 September, discussions took place with VVD, D66, CDA, PvdA, GroenLinks, ChristianUnion, SGP, Volt, and Liane den Haan about forming an extra-parliamentary cabinet, but this option lacked sufficient support. After the formation, Segers learned that VVD and CDA were considering discussions with PvdA and GroenLinks. However, to avoid new elections, D66 decided to lift the blockade against a coalition with ChristianUnion. The next day, Remkes presented his report, recommending negotiations between VVD, D66, CDA, and ChristianUnion.

== Informateurs Remkes and Koolmees ==
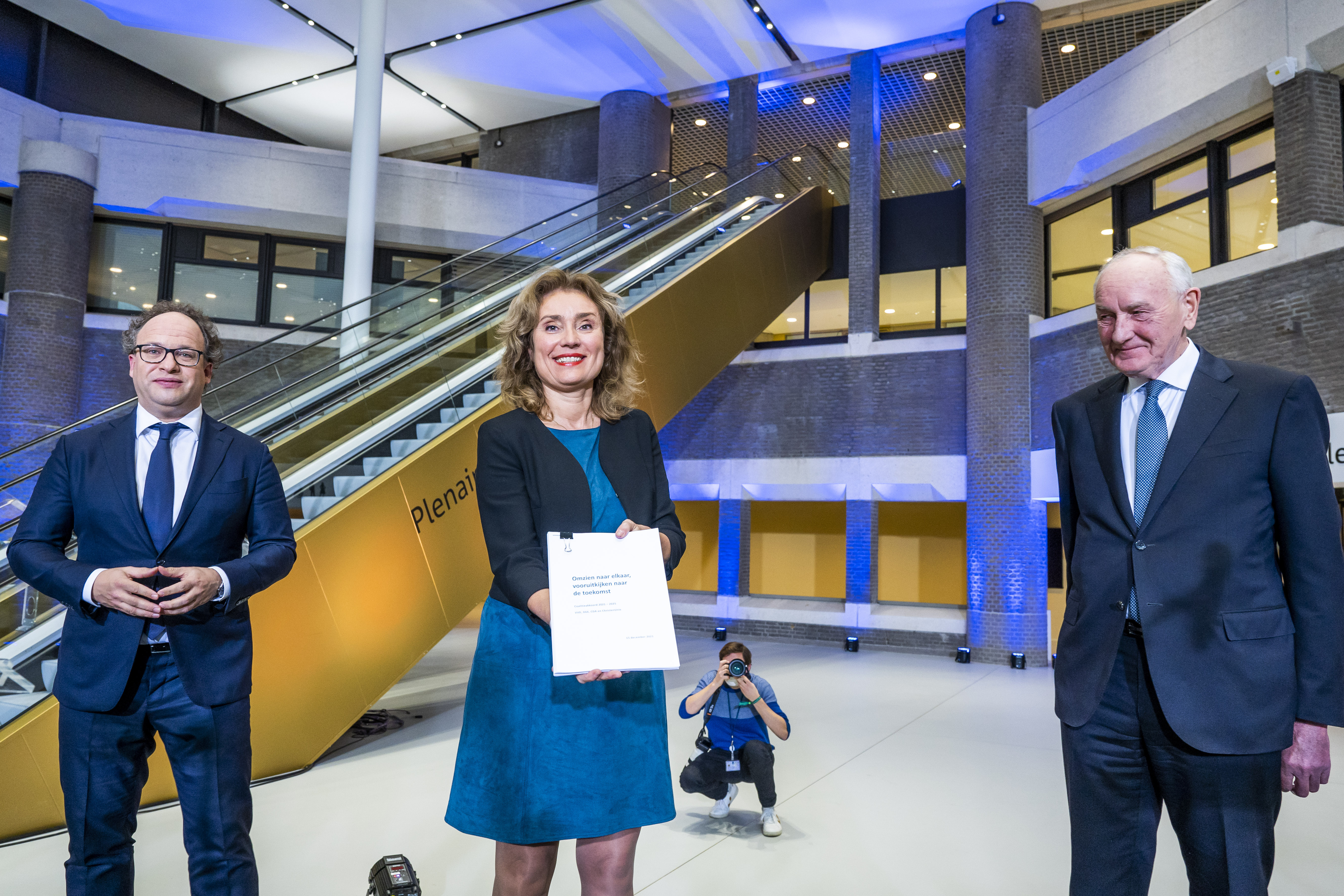
Speaker of the House Vera Bergkamp (middle) receives report from informateurs Wouter Koolmees (left) and Johan Remkes (right).

On 5 October, the House of Representatives held a debate on Remkes' report. During the debate, a motion was passed to appoint Johan Remkes and Wouter Koolmees as informateurs. For the duration of the formation, Koolmees relinquished his duties as Minister of Social Affairs and Employment, but did not resign. The substantive negotiations between the parties mainly took place between Sophie Hermans (VVD), Rob Jetten (D66), Pieter Heerma (CDA) and Carola Schouten (CU).

Following an adopted motion, the negotiating parties met for two days in the provincial hall of Groningen. There they talked to victims of the earthquakes above the Groningen gas field. At another time they met with victims of the childcare benefits scandal. The plan to also meet in Château St. Gerlach, to exchange ideas with victims of July floods in South Limburg, was too expensive.

=== Coalition agreement ===
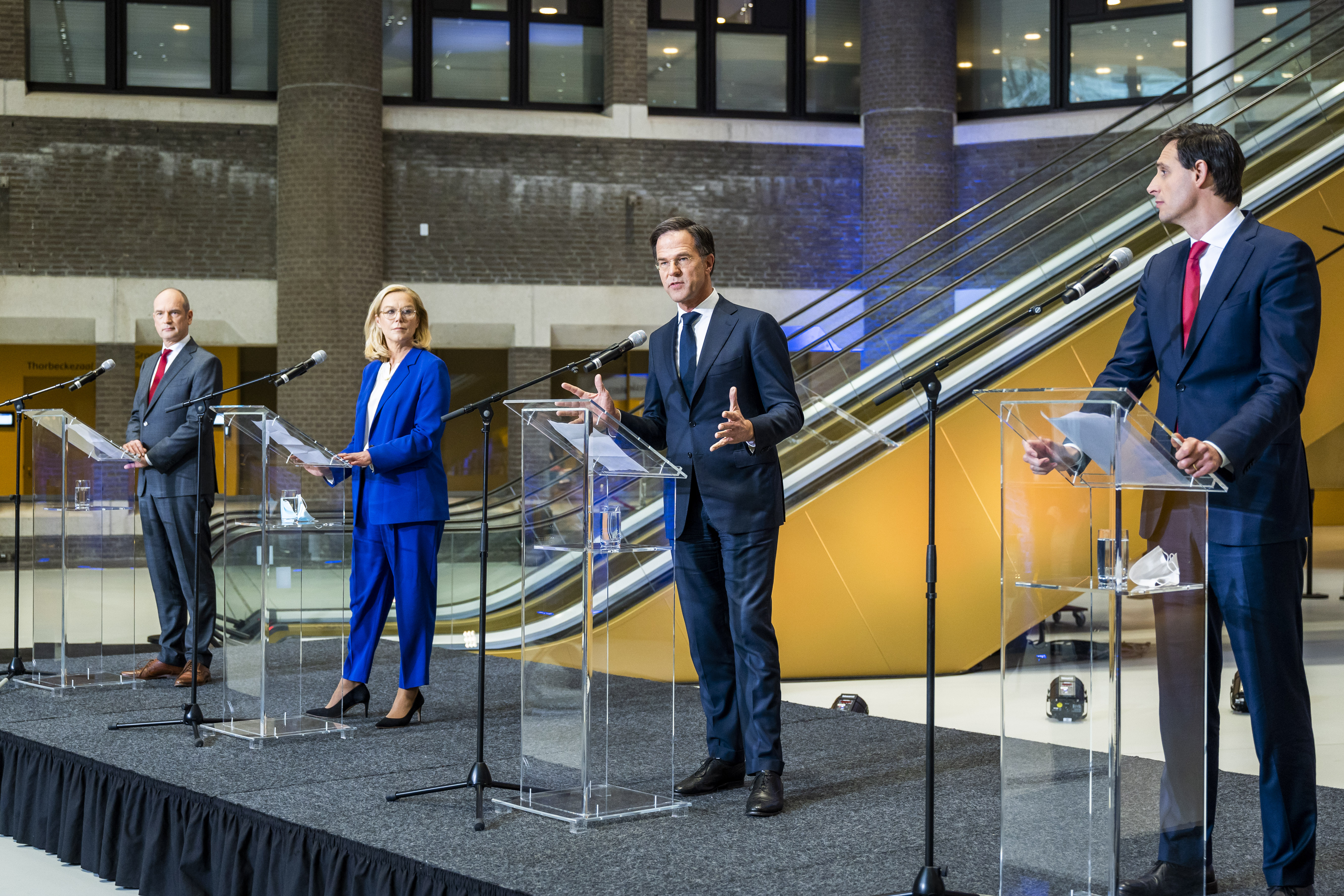
Presentation of the agreement by Gert-Jan Segers (CU), Sigrid Kaag (D66), Mark Rutte (VVD) and Wopke Hoekstra (CDA).

On 13 December, a negotiating agreement was drawn up and sent to the four House of Representatives factions. The parliamentary groups approved the agreement the next day, with some minor changes. A day later, the coalition agreement entitled "Looking after each other, looking ahead to the future" (Dutch: Omzien naar elkaar, vooruitkijken naar de toekomst) and the report of the informateurs were presented.

Regarding medical ethics, a major point of contention between D66 and CU, it was decided to exclude this subject from the coalition agreement. However, it was agreed that VVD and D66 would refrain from submitting bills concerning embryos until after the next elections. The coalition agreement was also marked by significant incidental and structural expenditure. Additionally, the agreement paid attention to the "democratic legal order," partly as a response to the benefits scandal.

== Formateur Rutte ==
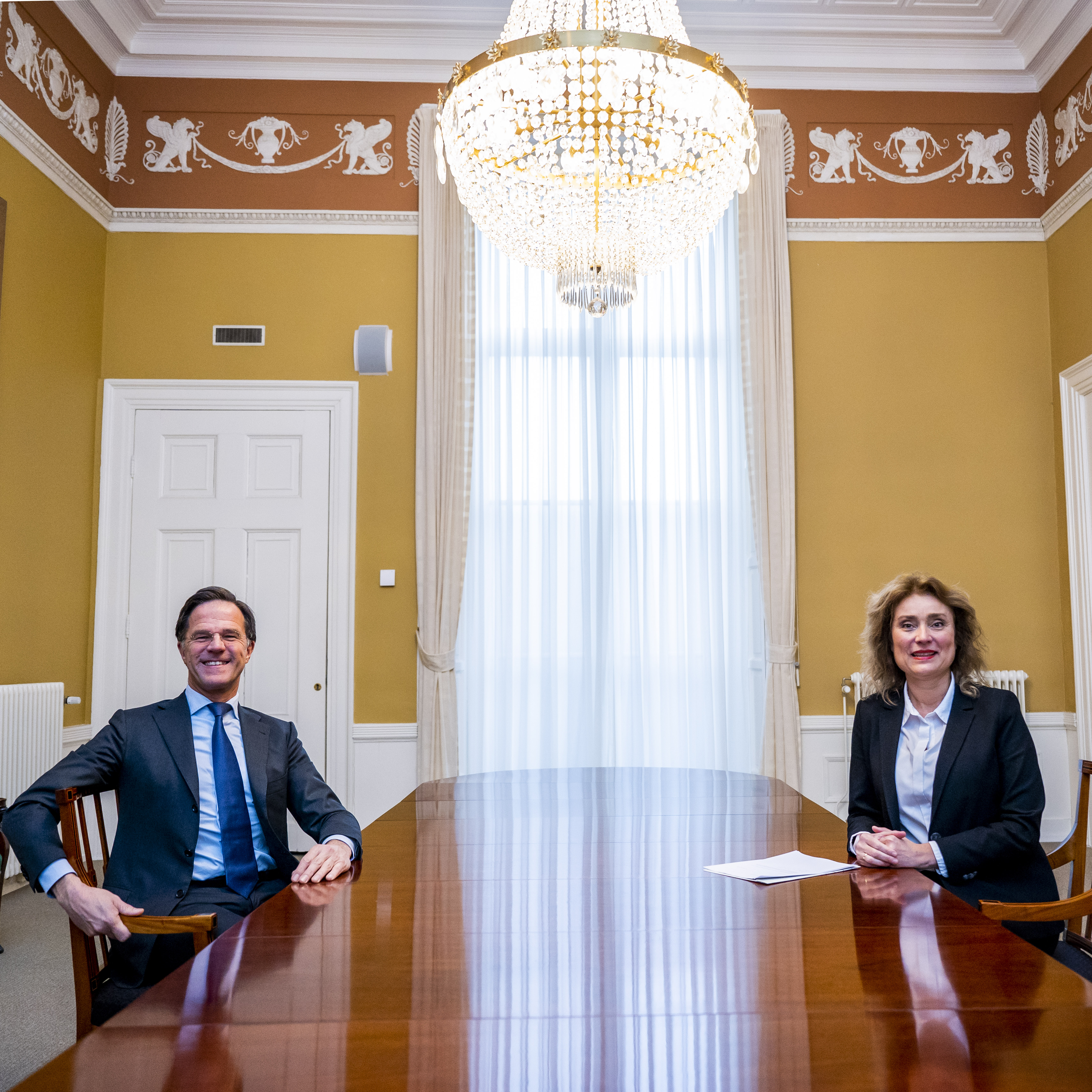
Formateur Mark Rutte (VVD) receives assignment from speaker of the House Vera Berkamp

After the debate about the coalition agreement and the report of informateurs Koolmees and Remkes, a motion was passed to appoint Rutte as formateur. The cabinet posts and portfolio distribution were determined in collaboration with the other party leaders. Subsequently, the party leaders nominated the cabinet members. Among those who declined was Rianne Letschert. These nominees were vetted by organizations such as the General Intelligence and Security Service and the Tax and Customs Administration. According to De Telegraaf, none of the nominated cabinet members were rejected following the vetting process. Beginning on 3 January, Rutte conducted interviews with the candidates.

During the search for cabinet members, the parties aimed for fifty percent women. In the end, ten of the twenty ministers were women, the highest proportion until then, and four of the nine state secretaries. A cabinet has also never had so many ministers with a migration background. (Note: Dilan Yeşilgöz, Franc Weerwind and Gunay Uslu.) Franc Weerwind was also the first black minister since 1905.

Following the talks, the nominated cabinet members met on 8 January 2022 for the constitutive deliberation (Dutch: Constituerend beraad). Afterwards, Rutte presented his final report to the speaker of the House. On 10 January 2022, the fourth Rutte cabinet was sworn in.

== Aftermath ==
The government policy statement was made in the House of Representatives on 18 January. A vote of no confidence, tabled during the ensuing debate, was supported only by PVV and FvD. A month later, the Senate debated the government policy statement. The vote of no confidence there was only supported by the PVV and the Otten group. The fact that the coalition did not have a majority in the Senate immediately turned out to be a problem when the opposition passed motions against parts of the coalition agreement.

=== Evaluation ===
Another incredibly interesting time politically
(Dutch: Politiek weer een ongelofelijk interessante tijd)

— Mark Rutte, Evaluation of the cabinet formation

Speaker of the House Vera Bergkamp had an evaluation carried out under the chairmanship of Professor Carla van Baalen. This led to eleven recommendations, including the introduction of deadlines for informateurs, observing the confidentiality of the formation interviews, keeping the exploratory phase "small" and clarifying the role of the House of Representatives in directing cabinet formations. The formation – and particularly its length – was one of the causes of declining public confidence in politics according to The Netherlands Institute for Social Research.
