= 1999 Dutch cabinet formation =

Reconstruction of the second Kok cabinet

A process of cabinet formation took place in the Netherlands after the second Kok cabinet offered its resignation on 19 May 1999. The reason for the dismissal was the Night of Wiegel, after which the Democrats 66 (D66) wanted to resign. After discussions led by informateur Herman Tjeenk Willink, D66 was willing to join the cabinet with People's Party for Freedom and Democracy (VVD) and Labour Party (PvdA). The cabinet therefore withdrew his resignation on 8 June.

== Background ==
=== Second Kok cabinet ===
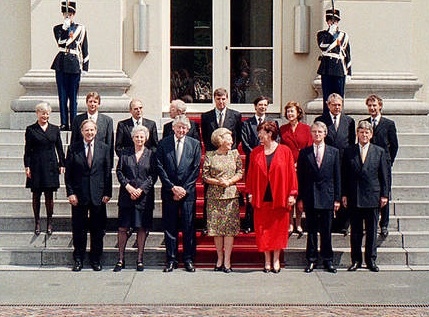
Bordes scene of the Second Kok cabinet in 1998.

The second Kok cabinet took office in 1998. Like the preceding first Kok cabinet, it consisted of the PvdA, VVD and D66 (known as the purple combination). In terms of content, D66 served as a bridge between the social democratic PvdA and the liberal VVD, but in the second cabinet D66 was no longer numerically necessary for a majority.

=== Night of Wiegel ===
An important reason for D66 to join the cabinet was the introduction of a binding referendum. During the first Kok cabinet, the necessary constitutional amendment had already passed both Chambers and the House of Representatives had also approved this in the second reading with the necessary two-thirds majority. However, at the first reading in the Senate, five members of the VVD voted against and indicated that they would maintain their objections. All five were required for a two-thirds majority. The March 1999 provincial elections showed that after the May 1999 Senate election the required majority would be even further away. Prominent D66 figures, including party leader Thom de Graaf, indicated that rejection of the referendum would have consequences for the cabinet. Prime Minister Kok came with that message to the Senate debate on the bill on 18 May. Under this pressure, five senators changed their positions. Only former party leader Hans Wiegel voted against during what has become known as the Night of Wiegel, meaning the amendment was rejected.

The cabinet met a day later. For VVD and PvdA this was not worth cabinet crisis. Also because the Netherlands was involved in the Kosovo War. They suggested resubmitting the bill, which meant it had to pass through both Houses twice again. This was insufficient for D66 and they wanted the entire cabinet to resign. If the entire cabinet did not resign, only the D66 ministers would. Kok and PvdA parliamentary group leader Ad Melkert wanted to prevent this so as not to give the impression that governing with VVD was possible without D66. They managed to convince their ministers. On 19 May, the cabinet then offered collective resignation.

== Informateur Tjeenk Willink ==
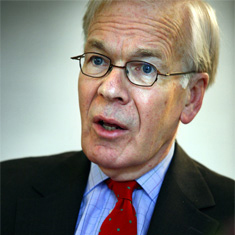
Informateur Herman Tjeenk Willink (PvdA), photo from 2017.

In the evening of 19 May, the crisis was debated in the House of Representatives. De Graaf indicated that new elections should be held. Dijkstal did not think elections were necessary and argued for restoration of the coalition or else continuation by PvdA and VVD. Melkert was against continuation without VVD and preferred restoration or elections. Opposition parties Christian Democratic Appeal (CDA), GroenLinks, Socialist Party and Reformatory Political Federation (PRF) argued for new elections. The Political Reformed Party (SGP) wanted a rump cabinet of PvdA and VVD. The Reformed Political League (GPV) wanted a new coalition based on the current House composition. The parliamentary group leaders reiterated these positions during the consultations with Queen Beatrix, who also received her permanent advisors. Only De Graaf was less certain by indicating that he would not refuse to cooperate in a restoration attempt. Based on the advices, Beatrix appointed vice-president of the Council of State and former PvdA politician Herman Tjeenk Willink as informateur to reconstruct the coalition. Melkert had also suggested appointing a D66 informateur to bind that party to the process, but D66 refused.

On 25 May, Tjeenk Willink started his conversations with Kok and the three parliamentary group leaders. Among the PvdA ministers there were those in favor of continuing to govern, if necessary without D66, such as Bram Peper, Klaas de Vries and Karin Adelmund. A growing part of the parliamentary group actually longed for an end to the purple coalition. Melkert emphasized the importance of trying to restore the coalition first. VVD maintained the position that they wanted to continue governing, but did not intend to actively accommodate D66. D66 members, such as De Graaf and founder Hans van Mierlo, had initially hoped that their principled position would lead to gains in the polls, but this did not materialise. This led to a growing conviction among parliamentary group members and veterans, including Van Mierlo, that a permanent break was not wise. It was also feared that other important points for D66 such as euthanasia would be at risk if CDA were to govern after elections. D66 therefore entered the discussions with Tjeenk Willink with the intention to join, but not at all costs.

Tjeenk Willink proposed finding a solution in the area of "government reform", where the crisis originated. VVD and D66 did not want to change the coalition agreement, but they did want to shift the emphasis. De Graaf proposed that the constitutional amendment should be resubmitted, but that a consultative referendum should also be introduced. This would not require a constitutional amendment and was therefore possible within this cabinet period. With the support of Melkert, De Graaf wanted the conditions for a referendum to be reduced, such as the number of signatures required. The VVD, which was not a big supporter of referendums anyway, thought the thresholds were necessary and feared that the temporary consultative referendum would remain permanent. The parties ultimately agreed that the temporary consultative referendum would have an end date of 1 January 2005 and that signatures could be collected electronically. They then reaffirmed other government reforms from the coalition agreement, such as dualization of local government, a different electoral system and mayor's referendum.

For a moment, two incidents seemed to get in the way of the restoration attempt. The final debate on the report of the parliamentary inquiry into the Bijlmer disaster took place on 2 June, which led to additional tensions in the coalition. The report contained critical conclusions about D66 Deputy Prime Minister and Minister of Health Els Borst, but also VVD Deputy Prime Minister Annemarie Jorritsma and Prime Minister Kok. The PvdA parliamentary group wanted to submit a critical motion against Borst, but she threatened to resign. Ultimately, the PvdA weakened the motion to such an extent that the debate ended without political consequences. On 7 June, D66 Minister of Agriculture, Nature Management and Fisheries Hayo Apotheker resigned due to a lack of support for the reduction of the pig herd. Later that day, the Council of Ministers agreed to the negotiation result. A day later they withdrew their resignation. The position of Apotheker was taken by Laurens Jan Brinkhorst.
