= 1994 Dutch cabinet formation =

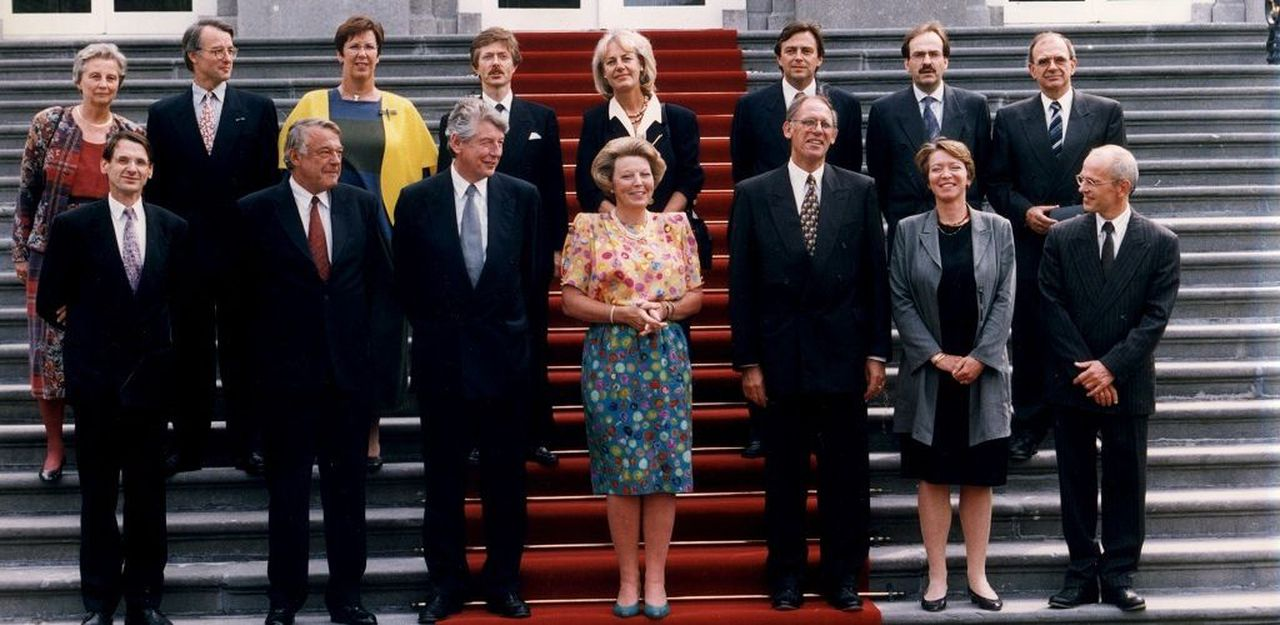
The official group photo of the ministers of the First Kok cabinet with Queen Beatrix at Huis ten Bosch Palace on 22 August 1994.

The 1994 Dutch cabinet formation followed the general election of 3 May 1994 and resulted in the installation of the First Kok cabinet on 22 August 1994.

== Background ==
Since 1918, the Christian-democratic CDA or its predecessors had continuously participated in government. The liberal VVD and the social-democratic PvdA last governed together in the First Drees cabinet (1951–1952). After that, both parties effectively excluded each other from coalition participation for decades, with the CDA and its predecessors often acting as the pivotal party choosing between left- and right-leaning coalitions, generally favouring cooperation with the right.

Nevertheless, within both the PvdA and VVD, voices increasingly advocated forming a cabinet without the CDA. The liberal D66 was even founded partly to break this dominant position. In 1976, at the initiative of the youth organisation of the VVD (JOVD), the so-called Des Indes discussions began. From 1977 onwards, meetings were also held with PvdA politicians. Later, in 1991, the “Wassenaar group” meetings took place between advisors of PvdA leader Wim Kok and VVD leader Frits Bolkestein. After successful cooperation in Amsterdam’s municipal government, further meetings were held between Kok, Bolkestein and D66 leader Hans van Mierlo. These contacts did not immediately lead to agreement, but helped prepare the ground for later cooperation.

== Election ==
The election resulted in significant losses for the governing parties CDA (−20 seats) and PvdA (−12 seats). Despite this, the PvdA became the largest party. Major gains were achieved by the VVD (+9), D66 (+12), and the new pensioners’ party AOV (+6). The incumbent cabinet lost its majority, retaining 71 of 150 seats.

== Informateur Tjeenk Willink (1) ==
Two days after the election, it became clear that a coalition of PvdA, VVD, and D66 would be explored first, as it included both the largest party and the main electoral winners.

On 6 May, Herman Tjeenk Willink (PvdA) was appointed informateur with the task of investigating the feasibility of a so-called “purple coalition”. The three parties together held 92 seats. Despite doubts expressed by VVD leader Frits Bolkestein, the process continued with further informateurs being appointed.

== Informateurs De Vries, Van Aardenne and Vis ==
On 14 May, Klaas de Vries (PvdA), Gijs van Aardenne (VVD), and Jan Vis (D66) were appointed informateurs to guide coalition negotiations.

On 3 June, party leaders Wim Kok, Frits Bolkestein, and Hans van Mierlo reached agreement on the main outlines of a coalition programme. However, disagreements remained on fiscal policy and income distribution.

Tensions increased thereafter, particularly over the scale of budget cuts and asylum policy. The VVD withdrew from negotiations on 27 June.

== Informateur Tjeenk Willink (2) ==
Following the breakdown of negotiations, Tjeenk Willink was again appointed informateur. It became clear that no viable alternative coalitions existed, as parties blocked combinations involving CDA, VVD, and D66 in various configurations.

== Informateur Kok ==
On 7 July, Wim Kok was appointed informateur and tasked with drafting a coalition agreement. On 25 July he presented a draft, which formed the basis for renewed negotiations. Despite criticism from VVD leader Bolkestein, talks continued.

A final coalition agreement was presented on 13 August.

== Formation and installation ==
On 22 August 1994, the First Kok cabinet was formally sworn in by Queen Beatrix.
