= Dutch cabinet formation =

Process to form a cabinet in the Netherlands

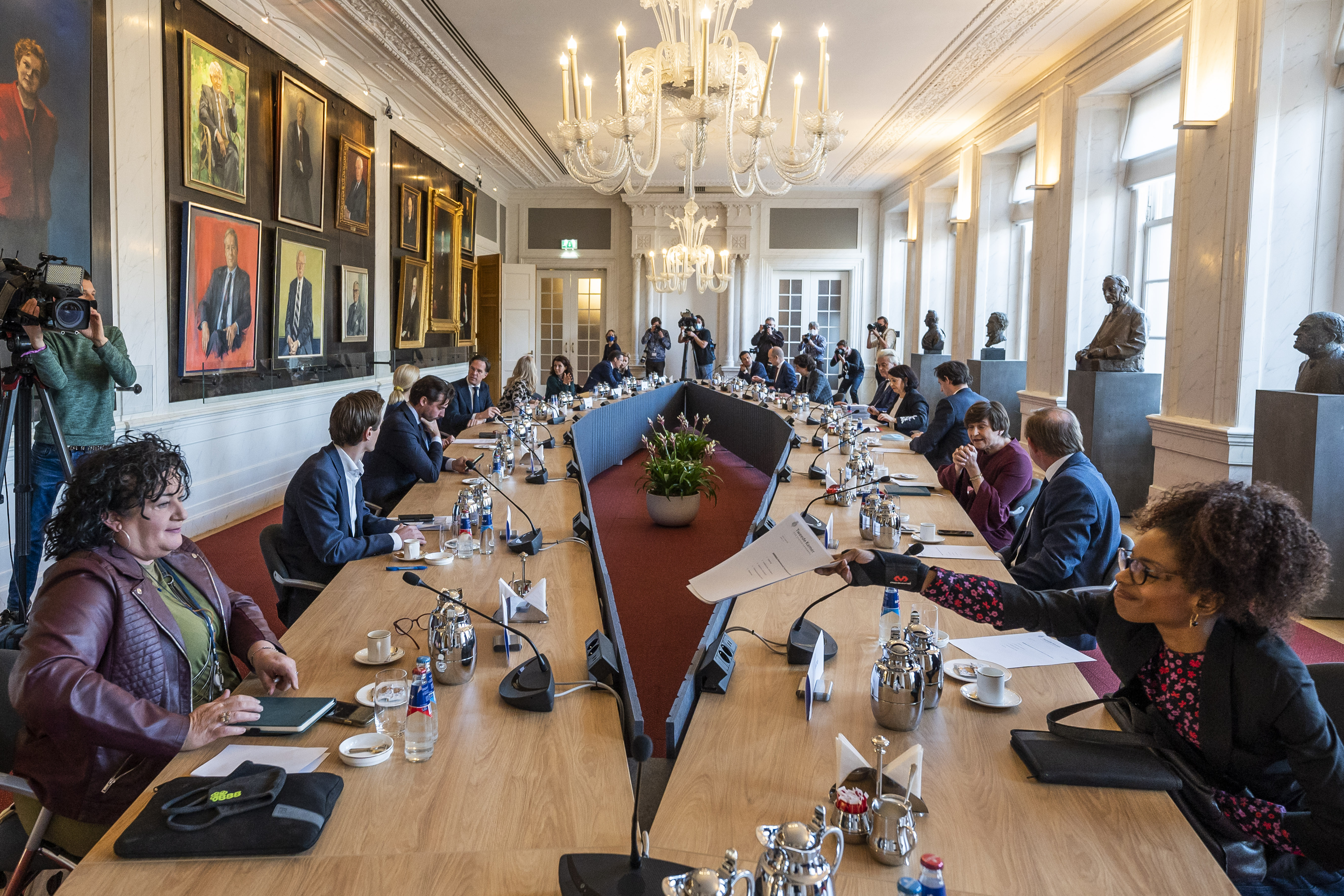
Expected parliamentary leaders meeting the day after the election to appoint a scout during the 2021–2022 cabinet formation

The formation of a Dutch cabinet is the process of government formation of a Dutch cabinet, consisting of ministers and state secretaries. Most cabinet formations take place after elections for the House of Representatives, but these can also take place in between.

There are no legal provisions outlining the specific process of forming a government. The only constitutional requirement is the appointment of ministers by the head of state at the end of the formation process. According to customary law, the confidence rule dictates that the new cabinet must have the support of the majority in parliament. Additionally, under the parliamentary system, there must be sufficient backing to pass legislation. These rules are complemented by conventions, traditions, and customs that have evolved and changed over time.

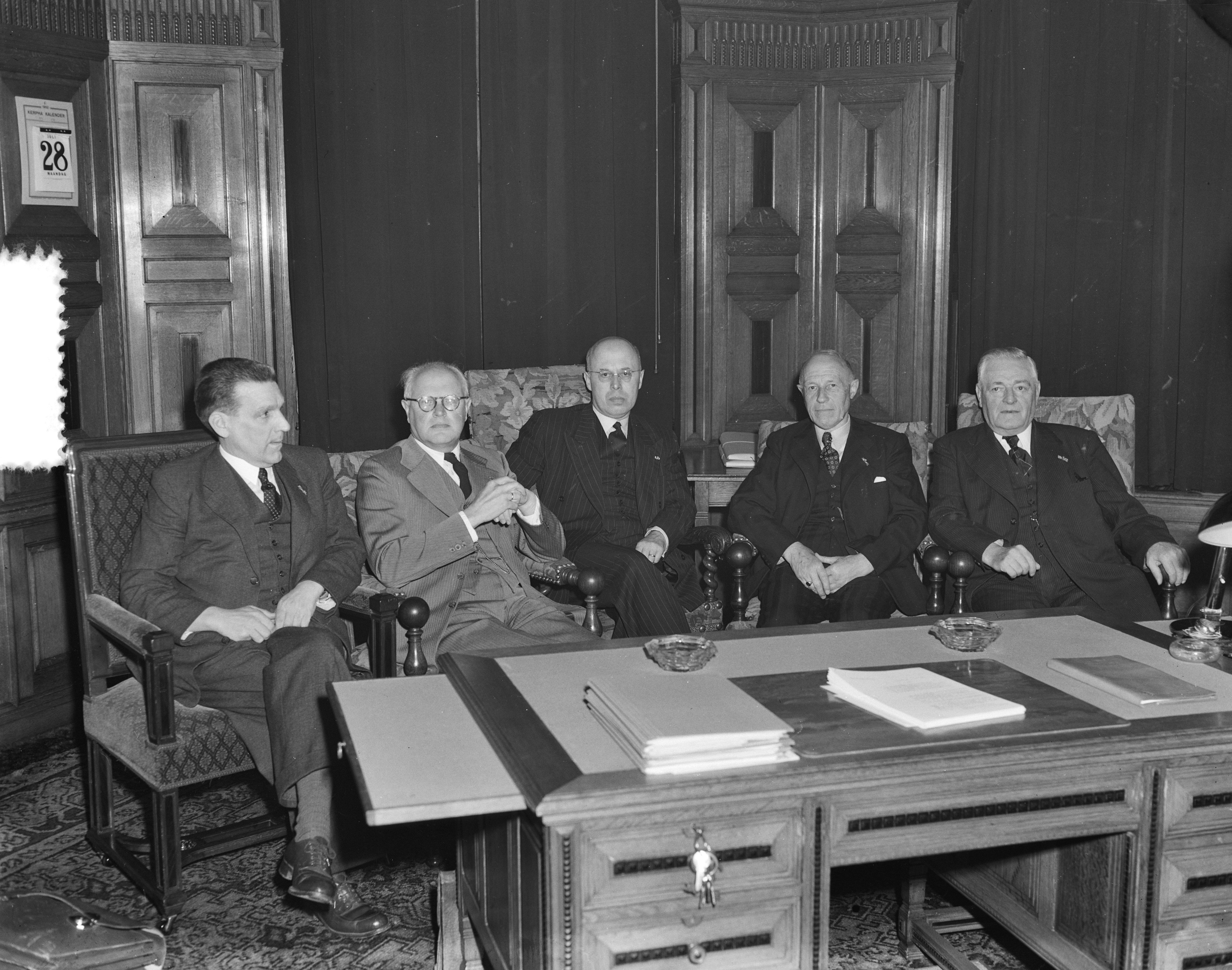
Formateur Louis Beel receives four parliamentary leaders during the 1952 cabinet formation

The formation can be roughly divided into three phases. In the scouting phase, a scout or informateur explores which political parties are willing to form a cabinet together. In the subsequent information phase, negotiations will take place under the leadership of an informateur about the government's future policy programme, to be recorded in a coalition agreement. During the formation phase, under the leadership of a formateur, the portfolios are determined, divided among the parties and ministers and state secretaries are sought. The specifics of each phase are flexible, and if a phase does not yield the desired outcome, the process can revert to an earlier phase. Ultimately, the appointed individuals are sworn in by the monarch, with the formateur usually becoming Prime Minister. The formation concludes with the adoption of the government's policy statement, which is then debated in the House of Representatives.

== Formation process ==
The cabinet of the Netherlands is the executive body of the Dutch government. It consists of ministers and state secretaries (junior ministers). The cabinet requires support from both chambers of the Dutch parliament to pass laws. Thus to form a stable government sufficient, and preferably majority support in both chambers is required.

Due to several factors—the multi-party system and the nationwide party-list system of proportional representation—no political party (in the modern sense) has ever had a majority in the House of Representatives or has come close to it since the adoption of the current proportional representation system in 1918. Indeed, the low threshold to get a seat in the House (currently 0.67 percent) makes it all but impossible for one party to win the 76 seats needed for a majority. To gain sufficient support in at least the House of Representatives, at least two parties must agree to form a government with majority support. The negotiations leading to this agreement are the cabinet formation period in the Netherlands.

The formation process after elections can be roughly divided into three phases: exploratory, constructive (also known as information phase) and formation phase. In these phases, agreements are made about the four P's: which parties participate in the cabinet, what program the cabinet has, what the portfolio distribution is among the parties and finally which persons will join the cabinet. If it concerns a formation after the fall of the cabinet, not all steps are often followed.

=== Resignation ===
Cabinet formations usually take place after general elections. Following the 1922 cabinet formation, it is convention that a cabinet offers its resignation around the time of the election. A formation can also take place after the cabinet has offered resignation following a cabinet crisis. Since 1972, the convention has been that no cabinet change takes place without elections, but a cabinet can be glued together or partially continued as rump cabinet.

=== Scouting phase ===
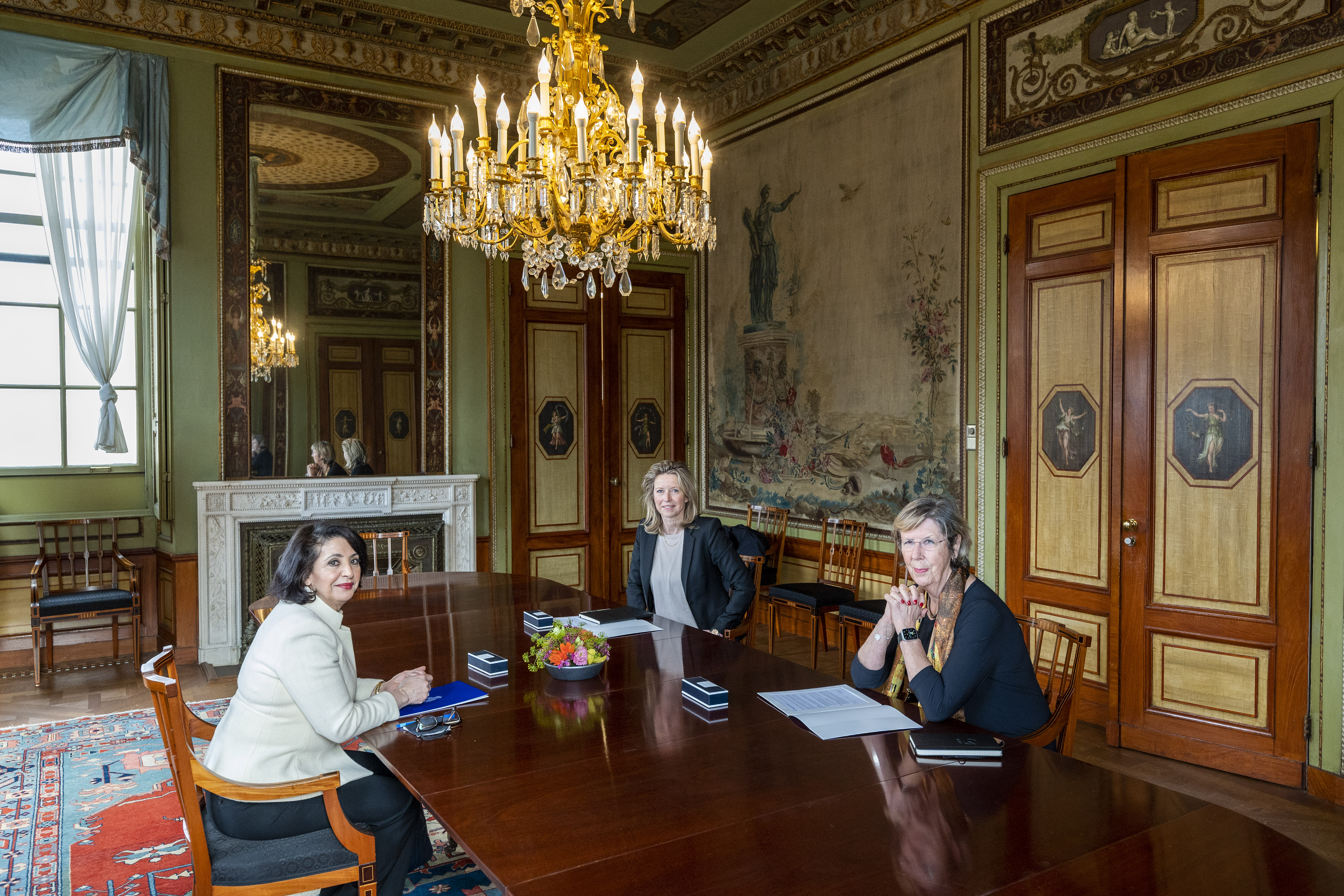
Speaker of the House of Representatives Khadija Arib hands over an assignment to scouts Kajsa Ollongren and Annemarie Jorritsma at the start of the 2021–2022 cabinet formation

The day after the elections, the likely parliamentary groups meet, although the results are not yet final and the new House will not be installed until two weeks later. The likely parliamentary group chooses their parliamentary leader, which in most cases is the lead candidate. The strategy for the formation are also often discussed. A day later, the likely parliamentary leaders meet to discuss the appointment of a "scout". The custom is for the largest party to nominate a scout. The scout then has the task to meet with all parliamentary leaders to see which parties can start programmatic negotiations. At the beginning and at the end of the assignment, the scout holds - just like later the (in)formateur - a press conference. The scout makes a report in which includes a recommendation for the follow-up process. This report will be discussed with the scout in the debate on the election results, which will take place as soon as possible after the installation of the new House.

At a later point in the formation, for example after negotiations between parties have failed, there may be a need for a new scouting phase. This is then carried out by an informateur.

=== Information phase ===
On basis of this advice, the House of Representatives appoints an informateur who explores the options for a new cabinet. The informateur often is a relative outsider and a veteran politician who has retired from active politics: a member of the Senate, Council of State or a minister of state. The informateur generally has a background in the largest party in the House of Representatives. It is also possible to appoint multiple informateurs, with backgrounds in other prospective partners. The informateur is given a specific task by the House of Representatives, often to "seek a coalition of parties with coalition agreement and a majority in parliament." The informateur has meetings with parliamentary leaders, and chairs sessions of negotiations between them. During these negotiations the parties try to find compromises on the policies of the future government and draft a coalition agreement.

=== Formation phase ===
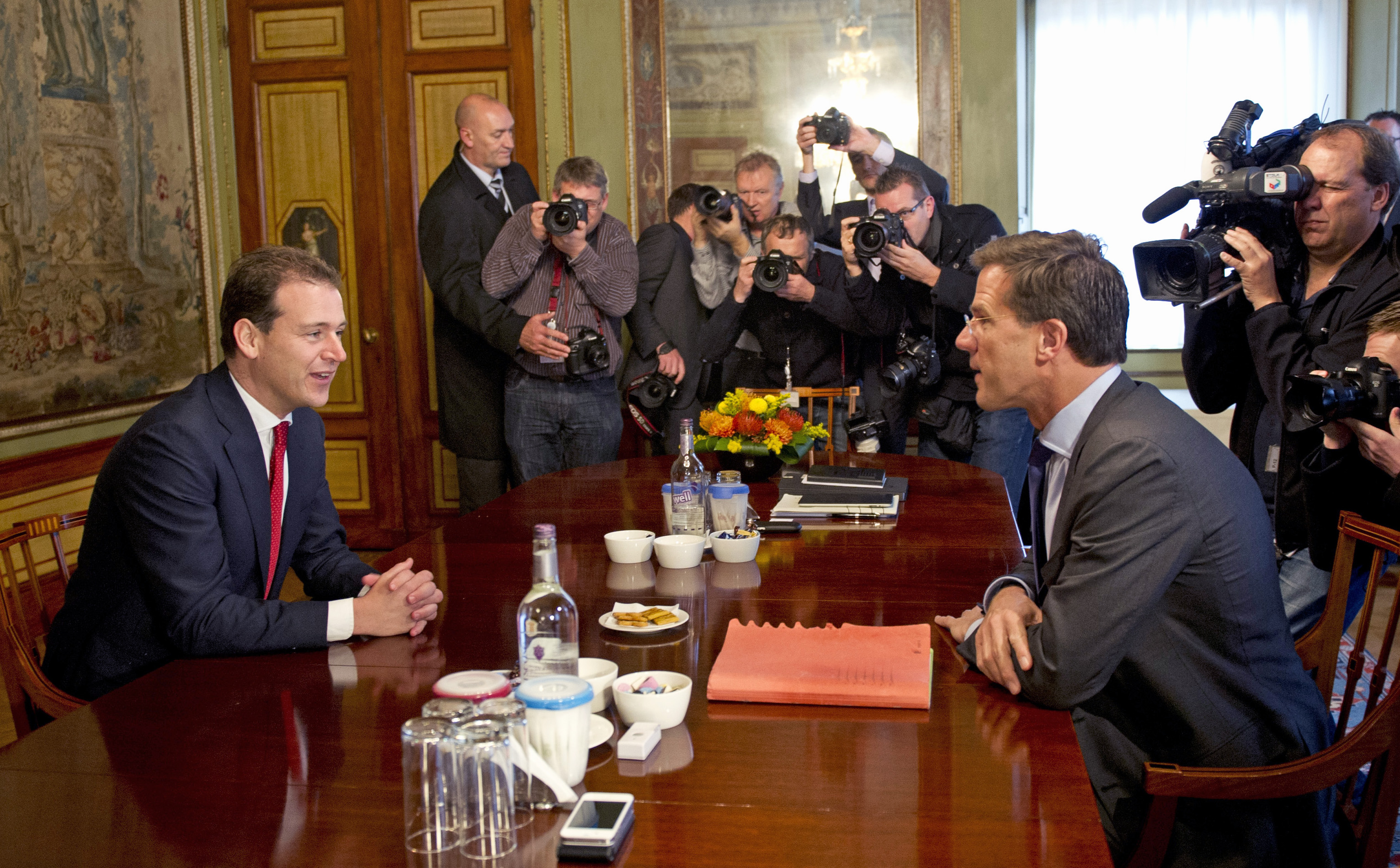
Formateur Mark Rutte receives candidate minister and deputy prime minister Lodewijk Asscher during the 2012 cabinet formation

As soon as the intended coalition partners have agreed on a coalition agreement, a formateur is appointed with the task of forming a cabinet. Usually this is the intended prime minister. Even before the formation, parties have contacted potential ministers within their party. In this phase, the formateur, in consultation with negotiators of the coalition, approaches the candidate ministers and candidate state secretaries.

After a candidacy has been accepted, the files on the candidate cabinet member are investigated in the judicial documentation register, at the General Intelligence and Security Service and at the Tax and Customs Administration. A conversation then takes place between the candidate and the formateur, during which they are asked whether there are any possible obstacles to accepting the position. Business interests must be put at a distance. After the interview, the candidate confirms in writing what was discussed to the formateur. After completion of all discussions, the formateur discusses the report with the parliamentary group leaders of the coalition and informs the prime ministers of Aruba, Curaçao and Sint Maarten.

=== Constitutive deliberation ===
When the new team of ministers is complete, the candidate ministers will meet in the constitutive deliberation (Dutch: Constituerend beraad). During this meeting, agreements are made on procedural matters such as the portfolio distribution, replacement scheme, profile of the cabinet and the unity of cabinet policy. Comments can be made about the coalition agreement and the government statement is discussed. If no objections arise from the constitutive deliberation, the formateur will submit a final report.

=== Appointment and swearing in ===
As laid down in articles 43 and 46 of the Constitution, the king/queen issues Royal Decrees in which the resignation of departing ministers is accepted and new ministers are appointed. The new prime minister countersigns the resignations and the appointments. In doing so, they assume ministerial responsibility for these decisions. Ministers who were already part of the previous cabinet are not sworn in again, but they are not dismissed. The new ministers then swear or promise, as laid down in article 49 of the Constitution, allegiance to the king/queen, the Statute for the Kingdom and the Constitution, and take a purification oath before the king/queen. This has been broadcast on television since 2012.

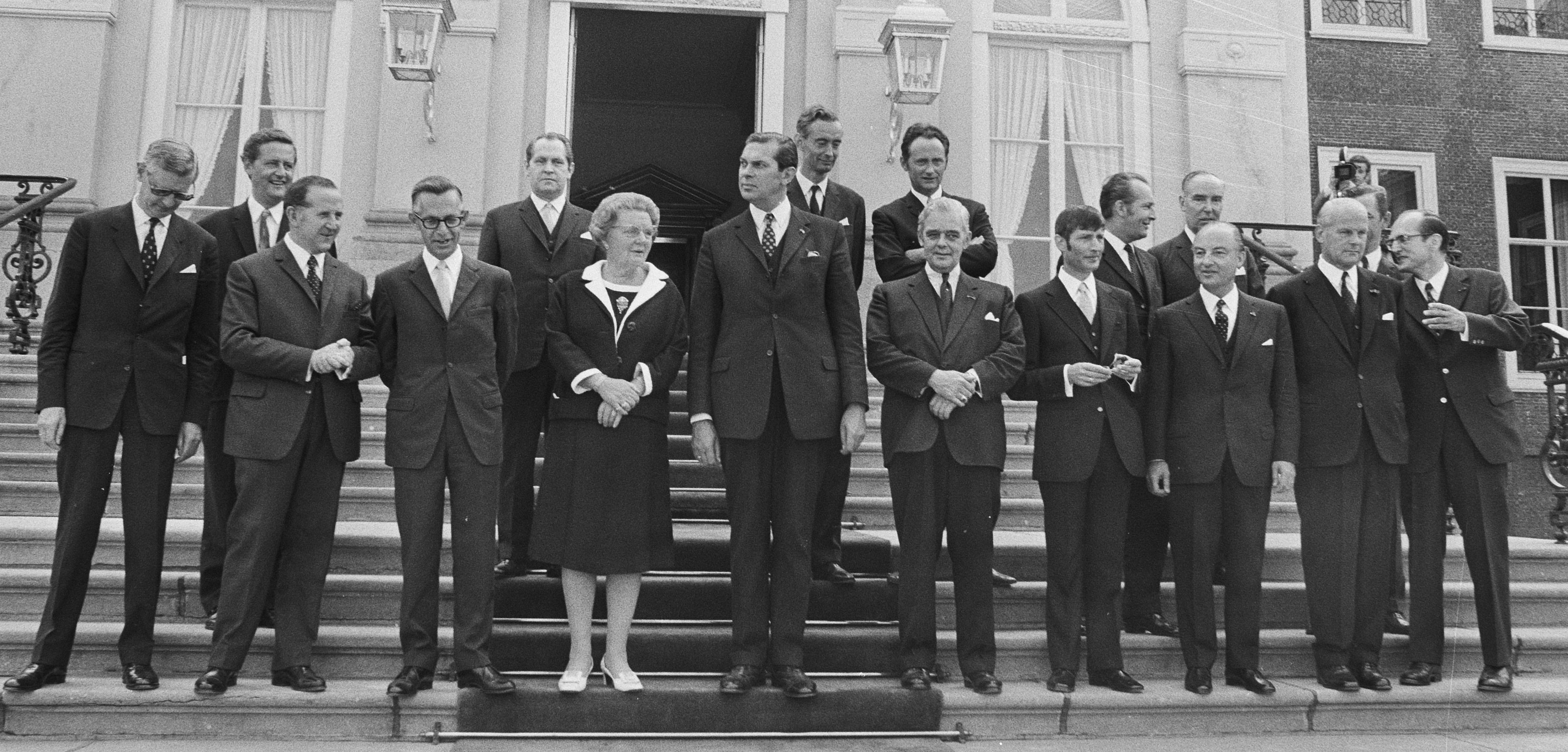
The bordes scene of the First Biesheuvel cabinet at Huis ten Bosch after the 1971 cabinet formation

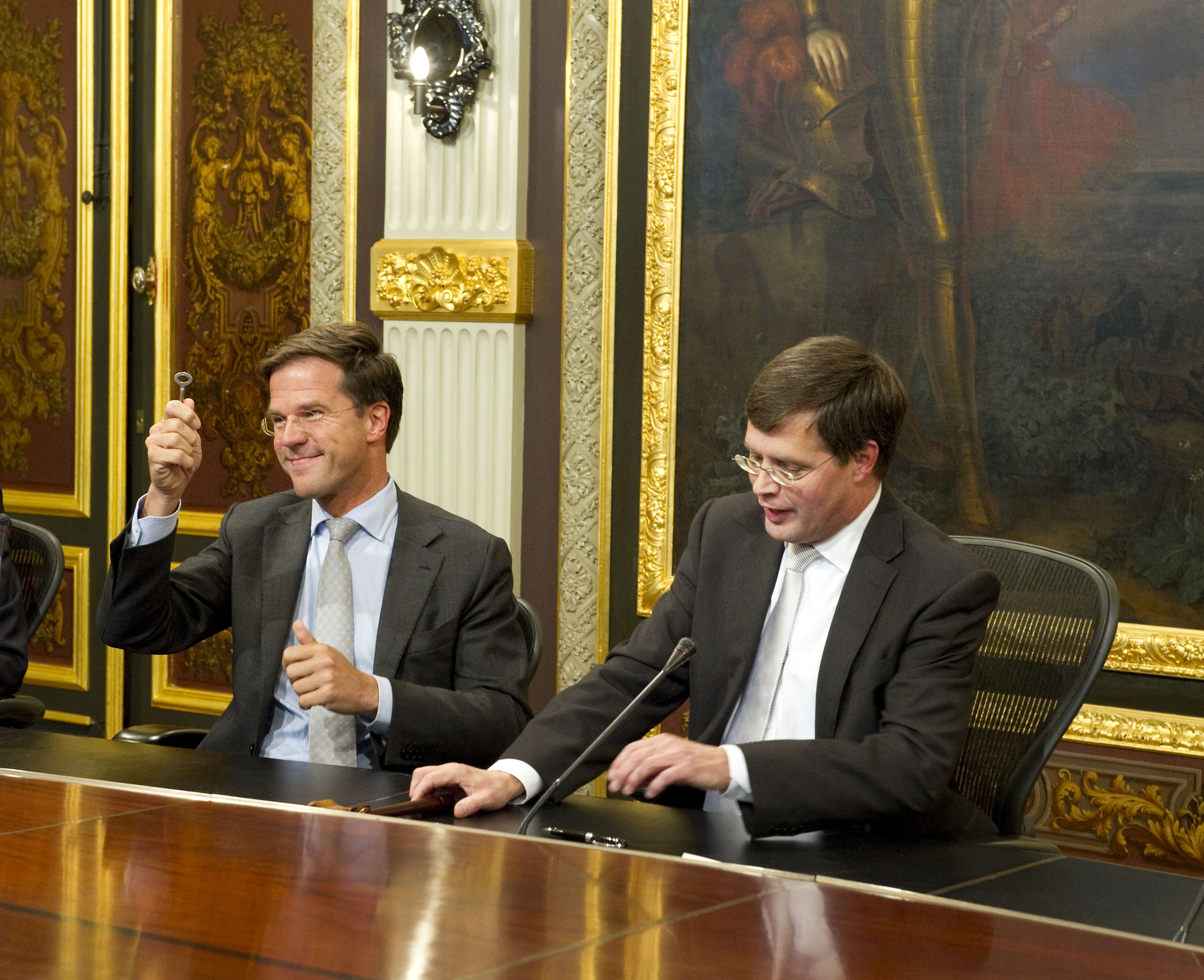
Prime Minister Mark Rutte (left) receives the key to the Torentje from outgoing Jan Peter Balkenende (right) at the end of the 2010 cabinet formation

It has been customary since 1971 that after being sworn in, the new ministers are photographed together with the king/queen during the 'bordes scene'. Afterwards the ministers go to their department where the official transfer takes place. For example, the Minister of Finance hands over the key to the treasury and the new prime minister receives the key to the office in the Torentje. A proces-verbaal of transfer is signed by both ministers.

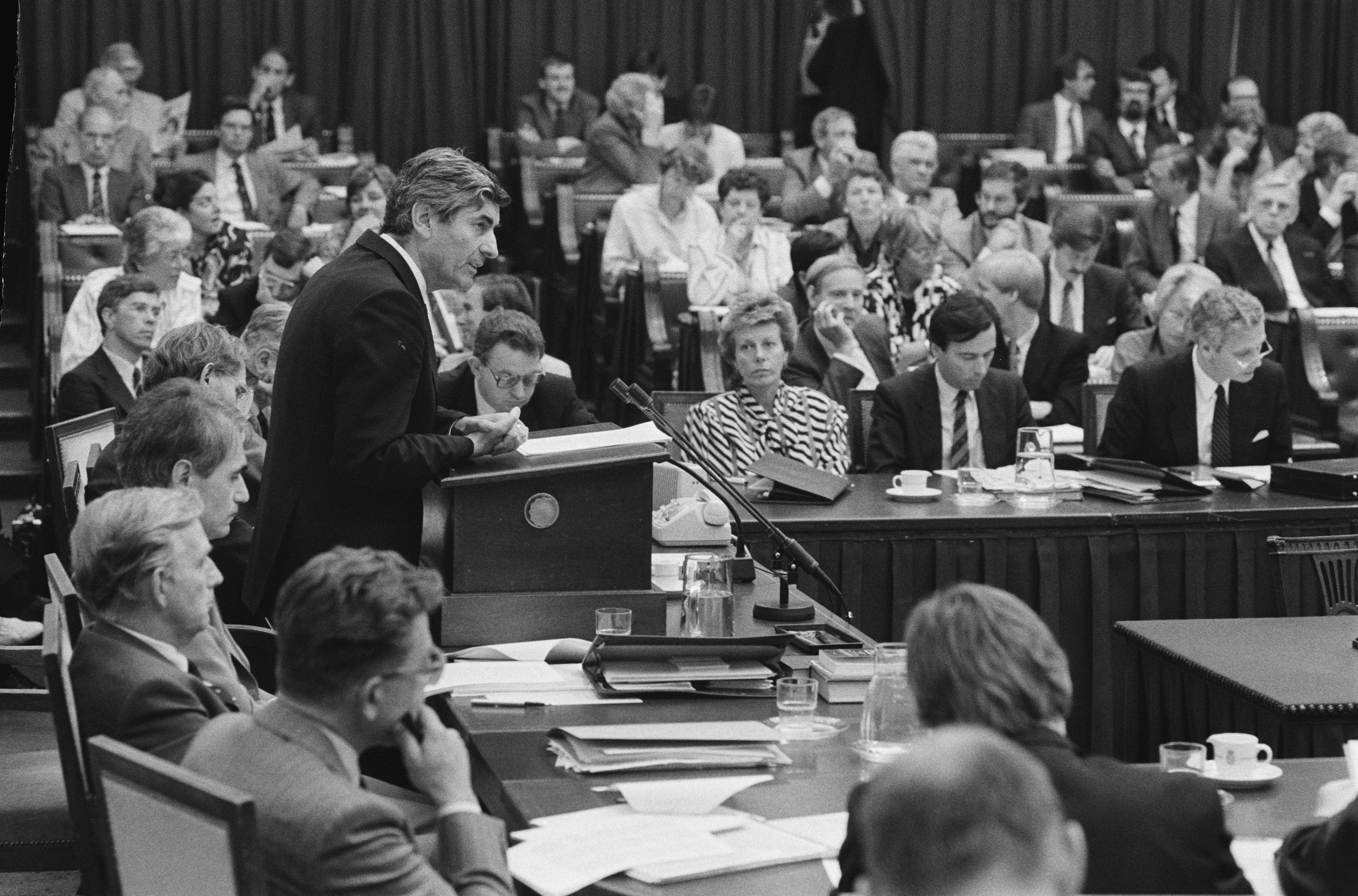
Prime Minister Ruud Lubbers during the debate on the government's policy statement after the 1986 cabinet formation

A few days later, the first Council of Ministers takes place, where the conclusions of the constitutive deliberations are included as the first item on the agenda. The government's policy statement (Dutch: Regeringsverklaring) is also discussed in the Council of Ministers and ultimately adopted. The prime minister usually delivers the government statement within two weeks after being sworn in, which is followed directly by a debate. The debate is the first moment at which the House can express its opinion on the required confidence in the cabinet (the unwritten confidence rule). If no motion of no confidence is adopted in that debate, the formation will be fully completed.

== Historical development ==
The process of forming a cabinet has its roots in the Constitutional Reform of 1848 and the introduction of the parliamentary system. Before that time, the governing duties and authority were vested in the king, and the ministers primarily served him. Since then, the process has evolved further, with the parliament playing an increasingly significant role, a development known as "parliamentarization".

Initially, the head of state still played a significant role in the formation process. After the Luxembourg Crisis in 1868, the confidence rule was affirmed, preventing the king from forming a cabinet against the wishes of the majority in the House of Representatives. This was reaffirmed in 1939 when the fifth Colijn cabinet was voted down during the government declaration. This cabinet had been assembled by formateur Hendrikus Colijn without consulting the House.

Starting with Queen Wilhelmina, it became customary for the head of state to seek advice from the speakers of the Senate and the House of Representatives, the vice president of the Council of State, and occasionally the Ministers of State. Since 1946, the head of state has also consulted all parliamentary group leaders in the House of Representatives for advice.

Based on the advice received, the head of state appointed a formateur. Until 1963, it was customary for the formateur to independently assemble the cabinet and draft a government agreement. The position of informateur was introduced in 1951, distancing the head of state further from the process. Gradually, the formateur became responsible only for selecting the ministers and state secretaries.

In 1970, the House of Representatives adopted the Kolfschoten motion, allowing the House to propose a (in)formateur for the head of state to appoint. However, this option has never been used. In 2012, due to dissatisfaction with Queen Beatrix's role during the 2010 cabinet formation, the Rules of Procedure of the House of Representatives were amended so that the House would appoint the (in)formateur. This change also introduced the practice of appointing a scout before the installation of the House, although this is not regulated in the Rules of Procedure.

== Criticism ==
There is criticism about the course of events of a formation in every formation. According to political scientist Carla van Baalen, these complaints can be divided into three categories: lack of dualism, democratic deficit and the rules of the game.

=== Dualism ===
Since 1946, cabinet formations have become more monistic, instead of the dualistic relationships envisaged between the House of Representatives and the cabinet. In those years, the coalition agreement was increasingly drawn up in consultation with the parliamentary groups of the coalition parties. They thus commit themselves to the agreements in advance and are therefore less critical of the cabinet.

=== Democratic deficit ===
Criticism of the formation process also focuses on the existence of a democratic deficit. Voters have influence over which parties enter the parliament, but they have no influence over which parties subsequently join the cabinet. Thus, there is a weak correlation between election results and the formation process. It can happen that parties that have lost the elections come together during the formation process and enter into a coalition to form a cabinet, while parties that have gained seats end up in opposition.

A proposal to reduce the deficit is a democratically elected formateur. The formateur would then be elected by voters simultaneously with the general election. The idea was launched by Jan Glastra van Loon in 1965. This was recommended by the state commission-Cals/Donner (1971) and the state commission parliamentary system (2018), but rejected by the state commission Biesheuvel (1985) and the De Koning committee (1993).

A large part of the promises from the calculations of the election programs by the Bureau for Economic Policy Analysis corresponds to the final coalition agreement. However, certain aspects often turn out differently. Citizens rarely, if ever, receive promised tax cuts, whereas unexpectedly businesses do. Government expenditures exceed projections, except in education. Coalition agreements tend to redistribute income more and also allocate more spending to welfare recipients. Possible explanations include a government wanting to start off well by improving purchasing power for all groups, and in negotiations, all parties aiming to secure something, which is resolved through increased spending and aversion to losses.

The cabinet formation is seen as non-transparent. The actual negotiations usually take place behind closed doors.

=== Rules of the game ===
One of the rules of the game that Van Baalen identified is speed; a caretaker cabinet must be in place for as short a time as possible. Cabinet formations in the Netherlands, however, take longer than in other countries. The longest formation was the 2021–2022 cabinet formation, which lasted 299 days. The duration of formations is influenced by whether it takes place after elections, how many parties there are and how fragmented the outcome is. A longer formation has no influence on the stability of a cabinet.

== See also ==
- List of Dutch scouts, informateurs and formateurs
- List of Dutch cabinet formations
