= Herman Tjeenk Willink =

Dutch politician (born 1942)

His Excellency Herman Tjeenk Willink
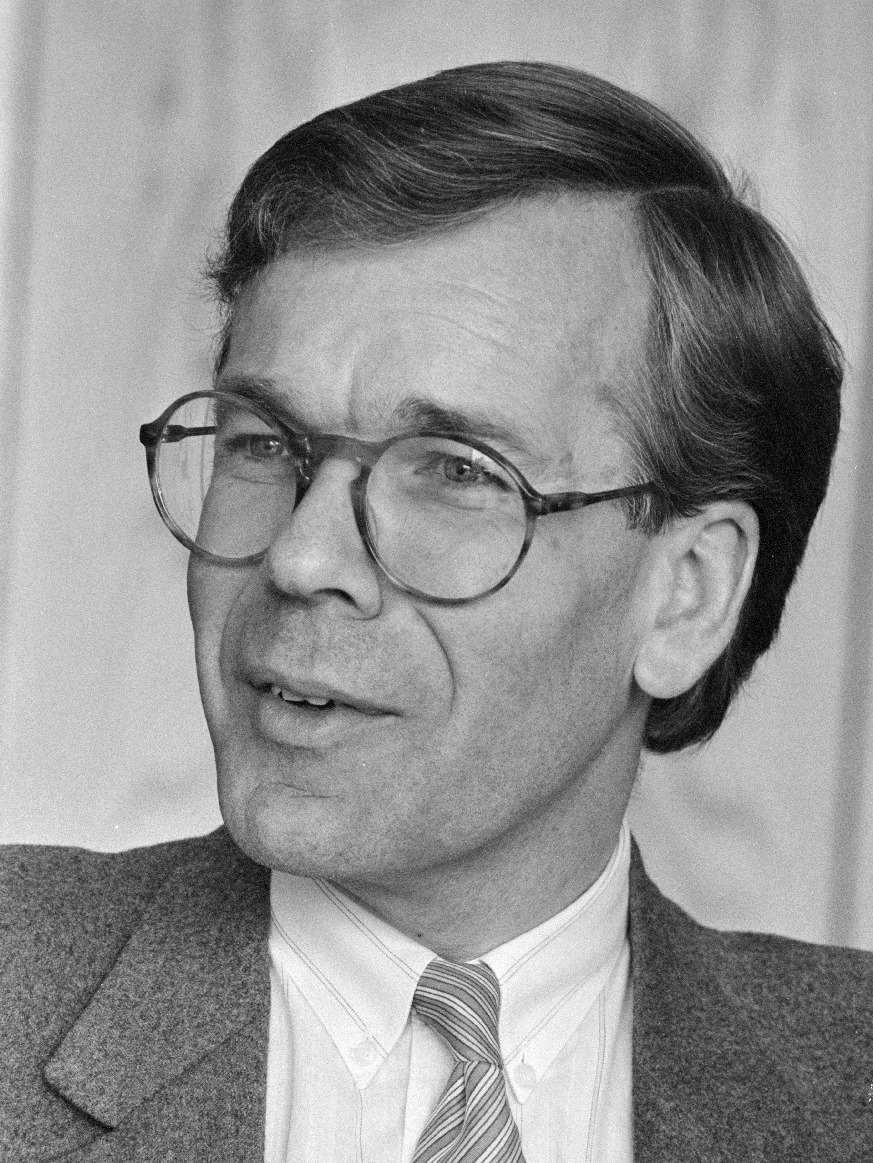
- Tjeenk Willink in 1985

Vice-President of the Council of State
- In office 1 July 1997 – 1 February 2012
- Monarch: Beatrix
- Preceded by: Willem Scholten
- Succeeded by: Piet Hein Donner

President of the Senate
- In office 11 June 1991 – 11 March 1997
- Preceded by: Piet Steenkamp
- Succeeded by: Frits Korthals Altes

Member of the Senate
- In office 23 June 1987 – 11 March 1997

Personal details
- Born: Herman Diederik Tjeenk Willink; 23 January 1942 (age 84) Amsterdam, Netherlands
- Party: Labour Party (since 1966)
- Education: Leiden University (LL.B., LL.M)
- Occupation: Politician · Civil servant · Jurist · Professor

Herman Diederik Tjeenk Willink (born 23 January 1942) is a retired Dutch politician of the Labour Party (PvdA) and jurist. He was granted the honorary title of Minister of State on 21 December 2012.

Tjeenk Willink served as a Member of the Senate from 23 June 1987 until 11 March 1997 and served as President of the Senate from 11 June 1991 until 11 March 1997. He resigned both positions when he was selected as the Vice-President of the Council of State taking office on 1 July 1997 and therefore the most important advisor to Queen Beatrix during that time.

== Decorations ==
Honours
| Ribbon bar | Honour | Country | Date | Comment |
|---|---|---|---|---|
| | Knight Grand Cross of the Order of Orange-Nassau | Netherlands | 1 February 2012 | Elevated from Knight (15 March 1997) |
| | Honorary Medal for Initiative and Ingenuity of the Order of the House of Orange | Netherlands | 9 December 2014 | |

Honorific Titles
| Ribbon bar | Honour | Country | Date | Comment |
|---|---|---|---|---|
| | Minister of State | Netherlands | 21 December 2012 | Style of Excellency |

== Honorary degrees ==
Honorary degrees
| University | Field | Country | Date |
|---|---|---|---|
| Erasmus University Rotterdam | Social science | Netherlands | 1997 |
| University of Amsterdam | Political science | Netherlands | 2007 |

Political offices
| Preceded by Piet Steenkamp | President of the Senate; 1991–1997 | Succeeded by Frits Korthals Altes |
| Preceded by Willem Scholten | Vice-President of the Council of State; 1997–2012 | Succeeded by Piet Hein Donner |
Other offices
| Preceded by | Informateur; 2021 | Incumbent |
