= 1922 Dutch cabinet formation =

Formation of the second Ruijs de Beerenbrouck cabinet

A cabinet formation took place in the Netherlands following the general election of 5 July 1922. The formation resulted in the inauguration of the second Ruijs de Beerenbrouck cabinet on 18 September 1922, comprising the General League of Roman Catholic Electoral Associations (AB), the Anti-Revolutionary Party (ARP), and the Christian Historical Union (CHU).

Because the right-wing parties of the first Ruijs de Beerenbrouck cabinet had secured a majority, they considered continuing in government. However, Wilhelmina indirectly compelled them to make their portfolios available after the parliamentary leaders of the ARP and CHU advised against an automatic continuation. In secret, CHU party leader Dirk Jan de Geer was appointed formateur, but the AB refused to support anyone other than the Catholic prime minister, Charles Ruijs de Beerenbrouck. As a result, Ruijs de Beerenbrouck was appointed formateur on 22 July. He negotiated an agreement with the AB, ARP, and CHU, which included budget cuts, a navy bill, and the diplomatic mission to the Holy See. The cabinet was appointed on 18 September and sworn in on 21 September.

== Background ==
The first Ruijs de Beerenbrouck cabinet was formed following the cabinet formation of 1918. It was led by the Catholic Charles Ruijs de Beerenbrouck and supported by the General League of Roman Catholic Electoral Associations (AB), the Anti-Revolutionary Party (ARP), and the Christian Historical Union (CHU), which together held fifty of the hundred seats in the House of Representatives. After several ministerial crises, the cabinet tendered its resignation on 16 June 1921, but continued following a formation process.

=== Election result ===
Seat composition of the newly elected House of Representatives during the formation: CPN: 2 SDAP: 20 PB: 2 LP: 1 LSP: 10 VDB: 5 ARP: 16 CHU: 11 AB: 32 SGP: 1

The confessional parties supporting the cabinet gained nine seats, securing a majority of 59 seats. On the right flank, the Reformed Political Party (SGP), led by Gerrit Hendrik Kersten, entered the political stage. This Protestant party opposed collaboration with the Catholics.

== Making available of portfolios ==
AB leader Wiel Nolens believed that, given the election results, the cabinet could remain in office, similar to the precedent set by the Theo Heemskerk cabinet in 1909. Although the government program and portfolios needed to be renegotiated, this could be done without requiring the ministers to tender their resignations. Ruijs successfully convinced the Council of Ministers of this approach.

On 10 July, Ruijs conveyed this to Queen Wilhelmina. Constitutionally, it was complicated for the Queen to act against the ministers, but she suspected there would be no support among the Protestant parties for another Catholic Prime Minister, especially as the Catholics already provided both presiding officers of the Houses of Parliament. She therefore asked Ruijs if he would agree to first consult the parliamentary leaders on this matter. Ruijs consented, on the condition that she also meet with ministers Heemskerk and De Visser.

CHU leader Jan Schokking and ARP leader Hendrik Colijn agreed with Queen Wilhelmina's expectation that a cabinet should be formed through a normal formation process, although both preferred a right-leaning cabinet. SDAP leader Pieter Jelles Troelstra believed the cabinet's continuation aligned with the election results, whereas VDB leader Henri Marchant considered this constitutionally inappropriate.

Given the deadlock, Queen Wilhelmina sought advice from Alexander de Savornin Lohman, former CHU leader and Minister of State. He shared the view that the Catholics had acquired too many powerful positions and believed this issue should be addressed during a formation process. However, he noted that requesting the cabinet's resignation could be interpreted by the Catholic press as Protestant pressure.

On the other hand, not requesting the ministers to tender their portfolios could create problems if a motion were introduced in the House of Representatives to compel the cabinet to make its portfolios available, a motion likely to be supported by the CHU and ARP. Lohman therefore recommended that CHU Finance Minister Dirk Jan de Geer persuade the cabinet to voluntarily tender its portfolios. If not, he advised Wilhelmina to remind the cabinet that it bore responsibility for its decision.

Wilhelmina subsequently informed Ruijs that she would not interfere in the decision and that the cabinet itself bore responsibility for whether or not to tender the portfolios. Confused by Wilhelmina's message, Ruijs asked if he could review the advice of the parliamentary leaders, but he received only vague responses. When he realized that two right-wing parliamentary leaders had advised resignation (likely Schokking and Colijn), he insisted on access to all the advice.

To avoid a conflict with her ministers, Wilhelmina agreed to ask the parliamentary leaders for permission to share their advice. Ruijs received these recommendations on 21 July. By then, the cabinet had realized that its earlier decision was untenable, and on 18 July, it tendered its portfolios. To the cabinet's frustration, the communiqué about this was not released until 22 July.

== Formateur De Geer ==
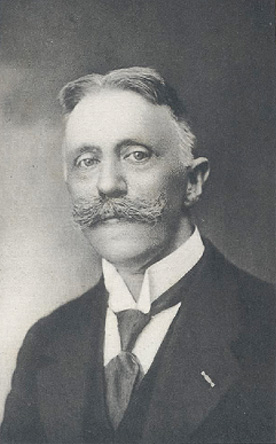
Formateur Dirk Jan de Geer, photo taken between 1926 and 1929

During his visit to Wilhelmina, Lohman also discussed what should happen if the cabinet tendered its portfolios. He first suggested Colijn, who was popular and strongly advocated for budget cuts. However, the Queen knew that appointing him would not be well-received by the Catholics and that he would therefore decline the role. As an alternative, Lohman proposed De Geer. On 19 July, Wilhelmina discreetly tasked De Geer as a formateur. His assignment was not to form a cabinet himself but to confidentially inform the Queen of how others would react to a formation led by him. No public communication was made about his assignment.

De Geer engaged in discussions with Colijn and Nolens without consulting his own party. He presented two plans to Colijn. In the first plan, De Geer would become prime minister and minister of finance, while Colijn would take on the roles of minister of war and minister of the navy to implement necessary budget cuts. In the second plan, De Geer would form the cabinet, but Colijn would serve as both prime minister and minister of finance. Colijn reacted negatively to both proposals. However, he indicated that De Geer as prime minister was acceptable if the Catholics agreed. To Nolens, De Geer proposed that he serve as prime minister. After consulting several parliamentary group members, Nolens made it clear that the Catholics would only support a Ruijs de Beerenbrouck cabinet. De Geer concluded that his assignment was complete and reported this to Wilhelmina on 22 July.

The brief formation process had soured personal relations between the right-wing parties. The AB felt that their popular prime minister was bypassed by the Protestants and the Queen. The ARP found themselves unexpectedly facing competition for their prime ministerial candidate, Colijn. However, the greatest frustration was within the CHU. They first criticized De Geer for acting entirely without consulting their parliamentary group. Additionally, they reproached the AB for not agreeing to their candidate, and the ARP for only supporting CHU's choice if the AB backed it as well.

== Formateur Ruijs de Beerenbrouck ==
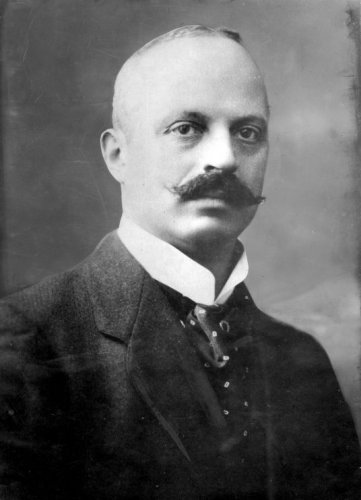
Formateur Charles Ruijs de Beerenbrouck

After De Geer's formation round, Wilhelmina tasked Ruijs with the formation on 22 July. He began discussions with the sitting ministers. He decided not to retain Adrianus Antonie Henri Willem König, and Simon de Graaff. He asked Piet Aalberse, Herman Adriaan van Karnebeek, Jannes van Dijk, and Theo Heemskerk to stay on. Hendrik Albert van IJsselsteyn indicated that he would resign to go on a trip. De Geer proposed that Colijn replace him as minister of finance, while Frans Beelaerts van Blokland would fill the CHU's position in the Ministry of Colonies. To Nolens, Ruijs suggested Gerardus Jacobus van Swaaij as minister of public works. Nolens advised Ruijs not to include Colijn.

On 26 July, Ruijs sought support for his formation from the parliamentary groups of the ARP, CHU and AB. Both the AB and ARP responded positively, with the latter noting that all three parliamentary groups should offer the usual support and that their demands reasonably should be met. However, the CHU, given the sensitivity following De Geer's formation, responded more cautiously, indicating that they would wait to see the outcome of the program.

On 1 August, Ruijs sent his draft program to the parliamentary groups. The main points of discussion in the responses – ARP's only arriving on 18 August – were the maintenance of the diplomatic mission of the Netherlands to the Holy See and the introduction of a Navy Bill to protect Dutch East Indies. For the AB, any reduction in diplomatic mission was out of the question, while the CHU and ARP wanted to retain the right to propose amendments for its abolition. The ARP and CHU parliamentary groups were strong supporters of the Navy Bill, while the AB and De Geer pointed to the high costs in times of austerity.

On 23 August, Ruijs met with the right-wing parliamentary leaders Nolens, Schokking, and Frederik Herman de Monté verLoren (who was temporarily replacing Colijn) in the Torentje. Regarding the Navy Bill, they agreed to delay it while further research was conducted. However, the issue of diplomatic mission remained unresolved. Ruijs then asked the Queen to persuade the Protestant parties, but she refused to intervene on such a sensitive matter.

Shocked by Ruijs' statement that he would end the formation if they refused to support the diplomatic mission, the CHU parliamentary group reached a compromise on 29 August. They agreed not to propose an amendment for its abolition themselves but retained the right to support such an amendment if it was introduced by others. The ARP adopted the same position on 28 August. On 4 September, Ruijs, Nolens, Colijn, and Schokking reached an agreement on the government program.

Minister of Education Johannes Theodoor de Visser had already tendered his resignation on 17 July due to fraud committed by his son, but the queen refused to accept it. Ruijs therefore assumed that De Visser did not want to return. De Visser, in turn, assumed that Ruijs no longer wanted him back. When De Visser presented a list of potential successors on 5 September, Ruijs realized there had been a misunderstanding and made it clear that he intended to keep De Visser in his position.

CHU member Bonifacius Cornelis de Jonge was asked to take on the Ministry of the Navy or War but declined the offer. Instead of De Jonge, Evert Pieter Westerveld was found willing to take on the Navy position. Despite earlier reservations, De Graaff would remain in the cabinet. It seemed the cabinet's personnel was nearly complete, until 6 September when De Geer stated that the financial implications of the Navy Bill were unacceptable to him and he refused the Ministry of Finance. However, on 8 September, De Geer and the ministers of war and the navy reached a compromise, and De Geer agreed to join the cabinet.

On 8 September, the constitutive deliberation of the cabinet took place. Afterward, an official from the Cabinet of the Queen departed for Stockholm, where the Queen had relocated on 4 September. On 11 September, the Queen signed the appointments. Upon her return, she swore in the ministers and formally established the cabinet on 21 September.

== Aftermath ==
The cabinet fell after a year and a half when the Navy Bill was rejected by the House of Representatives. A formation of a new cabinet failed, and the Queen refused to grant the resignation in early January 1924. The cabinet continued to govern until the 1925 general election, after which it was succeeded by the first Colijn cabinet following a cabinet formation.

=== Convention of 1922 ===
Because the Queen – indirectly – forced the cabinet to make the portfolios available, the "Convention of 1922" emerged. From then on, the sitting cabinet would always make the portfolios available around elections, allowing the head of state to freely appoint a formateur at their discretion. Another custom that arose as a result of the formation was that other parties involved, besides the head of state, could also access the advice of parliamentary leaders.
