= 1921 Dutch cabinet formation =

Formation of the first Ruijs de Beerenbrouck cabinet

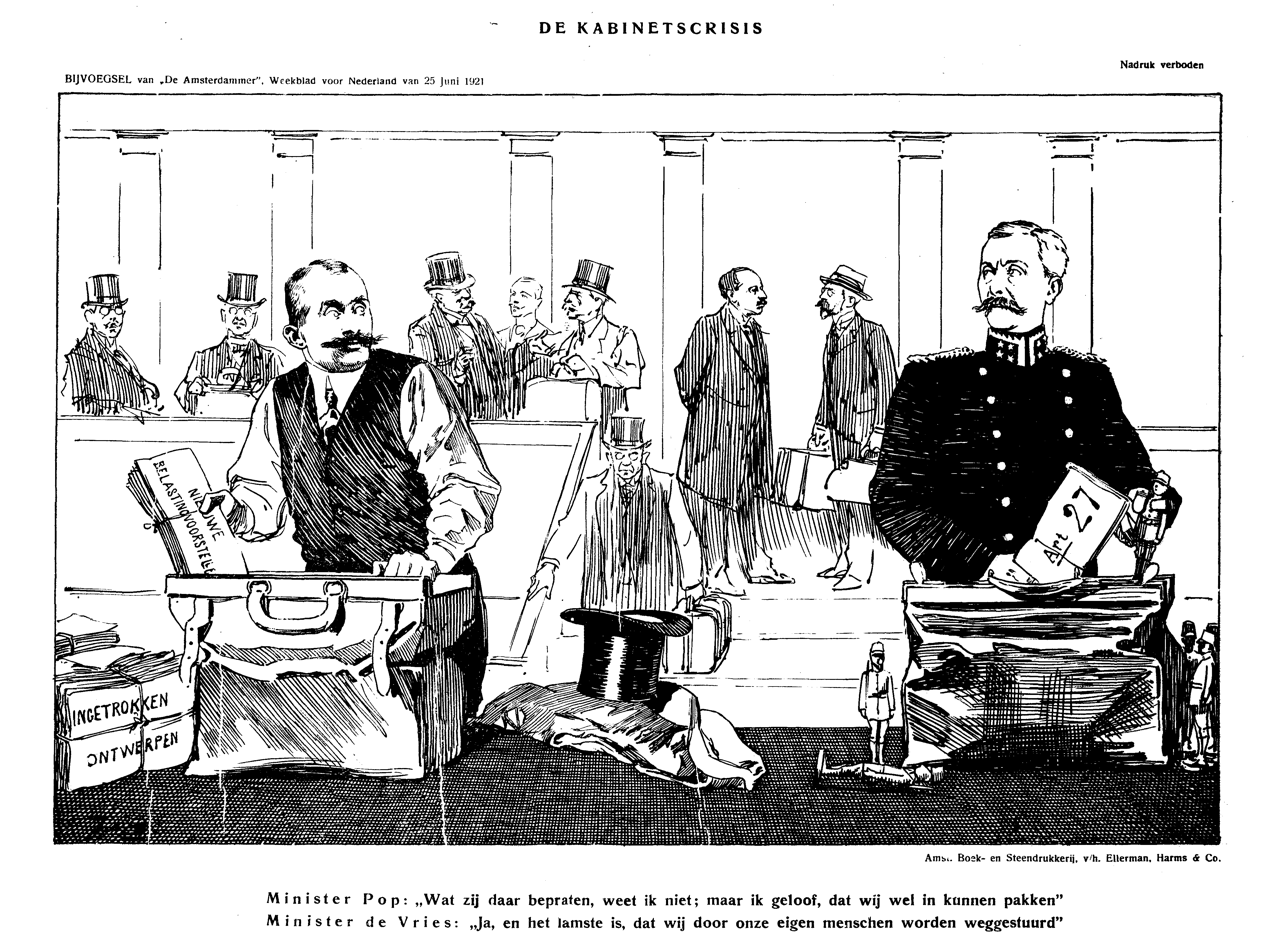
Cartoon by Johan Braakensiek in De Amsterdammer about the cabinet formation. Minister of Finance Simon de Vries Czn (left) and Minister of War and Navy Willem Frederik Pop putting their proposals back into the bag after they were rejected by the House.

A cabinet formation took place in the Netherlands after the first Ruijs de Beerenbrouck cabinet tendered its resignation on 16 June 1921. The resignation was prompted by ministerial crises involving Finance Minister Simon de Vries Czn and War Minister Willem Frederik Pop. During the formation, Prime Minister and formateur Charles Ruijs de Beerenbrouck selected Dirk Jan de Geer and Jannes van Dijk as their replacements. Additionally, the right-wing parties forming the cabinet – the General League of Roman Catholic Electoral Associations (AB), the Anti-Revolutionary Party (ARP), and the Christian Historical Union (CHU) – reached an agreement on the substantive issues underlying the crises. The two new ministers were sworn in on 28 July 1921, marking the end of the formation.

== Background ==
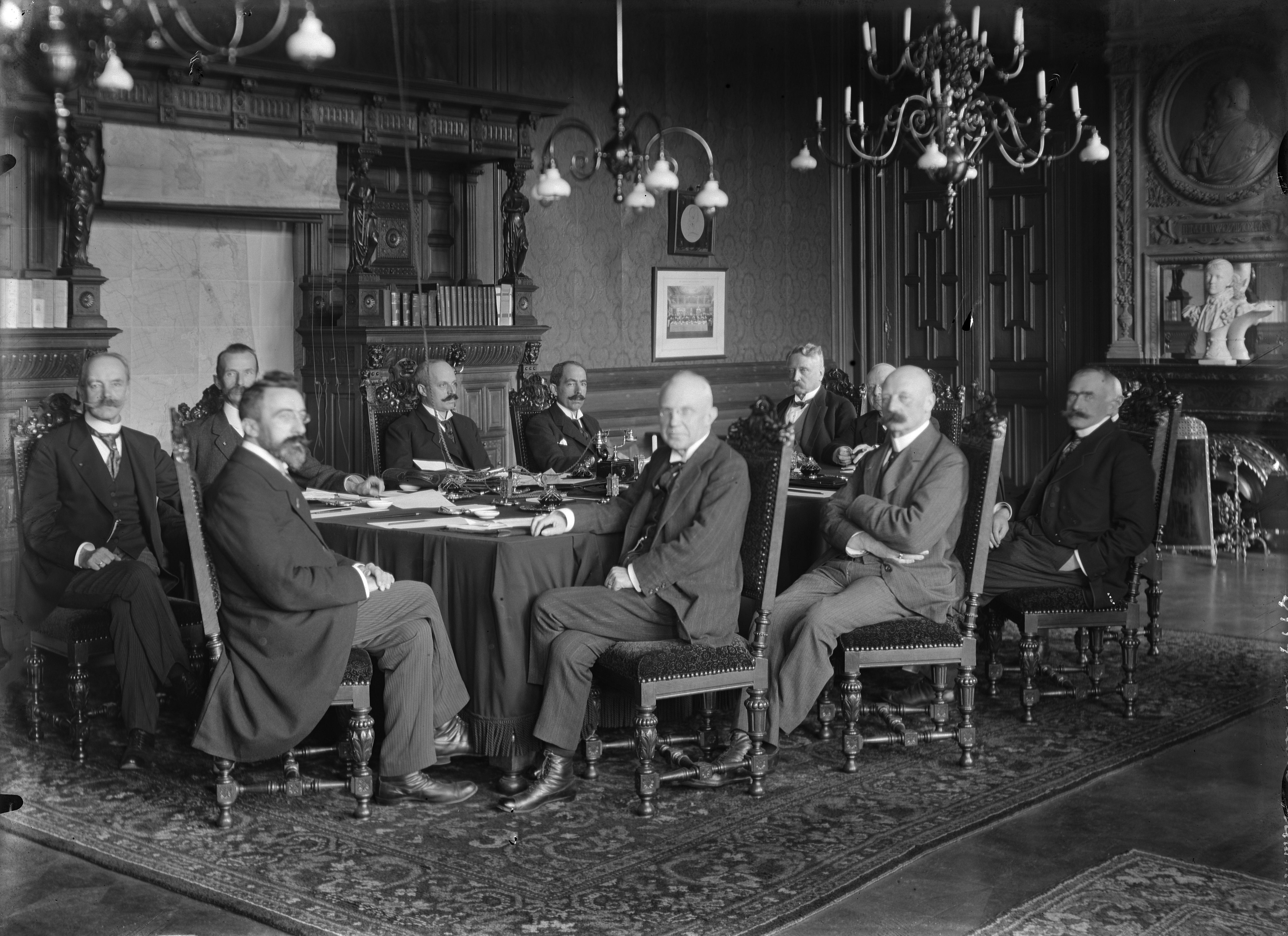
Council of Ministers of the first Ruijs de Beerenbrouck cabinet in 1918. From left to right: Idenburg, König, Aalberse, Ruijs de Beerenbrouck, Van Karnebeek, Van IJsselstein, Heemskerk, De Visser (partially visible), Alting von Geusau, and De Vries. Naudin ten Cate is hidden.

The first Ruijs de Beerenbrouck cabinet was formed after the 1918 cabinet formation. It was led by Catholic Charles Ruijs de Beerenbrouck and supported by the General League of Roman Catholic Electoral Associations (AB), the Anti-Revolutionary Party (ARP), and the Christian Historical Union (CHU), which together held fifty of the hundred seats in the House of Representatives.

Several ministers resigned prematurely. Minister of the Navy Willem Naudin ten Cate (non-partisan) resigned on 20 February 1919, believing effective cooperation with the House was impossible. He was succeeded by Anti-Revolutionary lawyer Hendrik Bijleveld. On 6 November 1919, Minister of Colonies Alexander Willem Frederik Idenburg (ARP) resigned for health reasons, and Simon de Graaff (non-partisan) took his place. On 5 January, Bijleveld and Minister of War George August Alexander Alting von Geusau resigned after conflicts with the House over their budgets. On 31 March 1920, both ministries were taken over ad interim by Lieutenant General Willem Frederik Pop.

In early 1919, a conflict arose between the ARP parliamentary group and Finance Minister Simon de Vries Czn (ARP). Ruijs de Beerenbrouck personally mediated the conflict, holding frequent meetings to resolve issues between the cabinet and the parliamentary group. These strained relations between the House and De Vries Czn persisted until 1921. On 13 May 1921, his amendment to the land tax law was rejected, undermining both De Vries Czn's and the cabinet's positions. The three parliamentary groups failed to reach a solution. A month later, Pop's amendment to the conscription law was rejected, leading to a loss of confidence from the anti-revolutionaries and Christian historicals. This deadlock prompted Ruijs de Beerenbrouck to tender the cabinet's resignation on 16 June 1921.

== Formateur Ruijs de Beerenbrouck ==
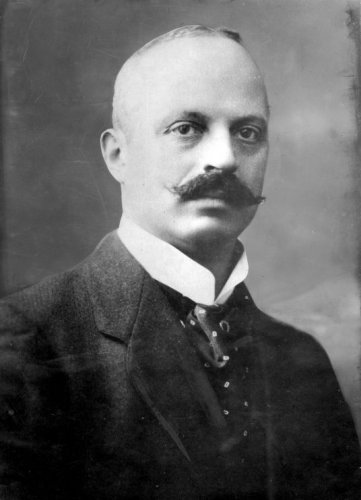
Formateur Charles Ruijs de Beerenbrouck

Queen Wilhelmina immediately aimed for a "reconstruction" of the cabinet, inviting only ministers and right-wing parliamentary group leaders. She asked the parties if they wished to continue the cooperation, to which they responded positively. Wilhelmina intended to appoint Ruijs de Beerenbrouck as formateur on 22 June, but he agreed only after consulting the parliamentary group leaders. SDAP leader Jan Schaper advised forming a civilian cabinet with his party in the opposition, while LU leader Pieter Rink and VDB leader Henri Marchant preferred to continue the cabinet. After receiving these advices, Ruijs de Beerenbrouck formally accepted the assignment on 28 June.

Ruijs de Beerenbrouck quickly realized that De Vries Czn could not remain. After discussing possible replacements with De Vries Czn, who subsequently resigned, Ruijs de Beerenbrouck approached Leonardus Trip and Gerard Vissering, who both declined. He then found a willing replacement in Christian historical Dirk Jan de Geer. To replace Pop, Ruijs de Beerenbrouck offered the War and Navy ministries to Colijn on 8 July, but Colijn declined, citing his preference for a stronger defense policy and new elections to secure a right-wing majority. After Colijn's refusal, Ruijs de Beerenbrouck appointed anti-revolutionary Jannes van Dijk to the post.

The cabinet and parliamentary groups negotiated about the issues leading to the crisis. The parliamentary groups agreed on Van Dijk's defense memorandum, including conscription law arrangements, and on limiting general expenditures. On 26 July, De Geer and Van Dijk definitively accepted their positions, and they were sworn in on 28 July, allowing the cabinet to resume its work.

== Aftermath ==
The cabinet remained in office until after the 1922 general election. Despite warnings from Colijn that early elections in 1921 would be better, the cabinet secured a majority of sixty seats. However, the Queen ultimately forced the cabinet to resign. The subsequent 1922 cabinet formation resulted in the second Ruijs de Beerenbrouck cabinet, which was largely a continuation with a few ministerial changes.

== Source ==
- Puchinger, G. (1970). Colijn en het einde van de coalitie I. De geschiedenis van de kabinetsformaties 1918-1924 [Colijn and the end of the coalition I. The history of cabinet formations 1918-1924] (in Dutch). Kampen: J.H. Kok. ISBN 978-90-242-1538-6.
