= First Ruijs de Beerenbrouck cabinet =

Cabinet of the Netherlands, 1918 to 1922

- Cabinet of the Netherlands

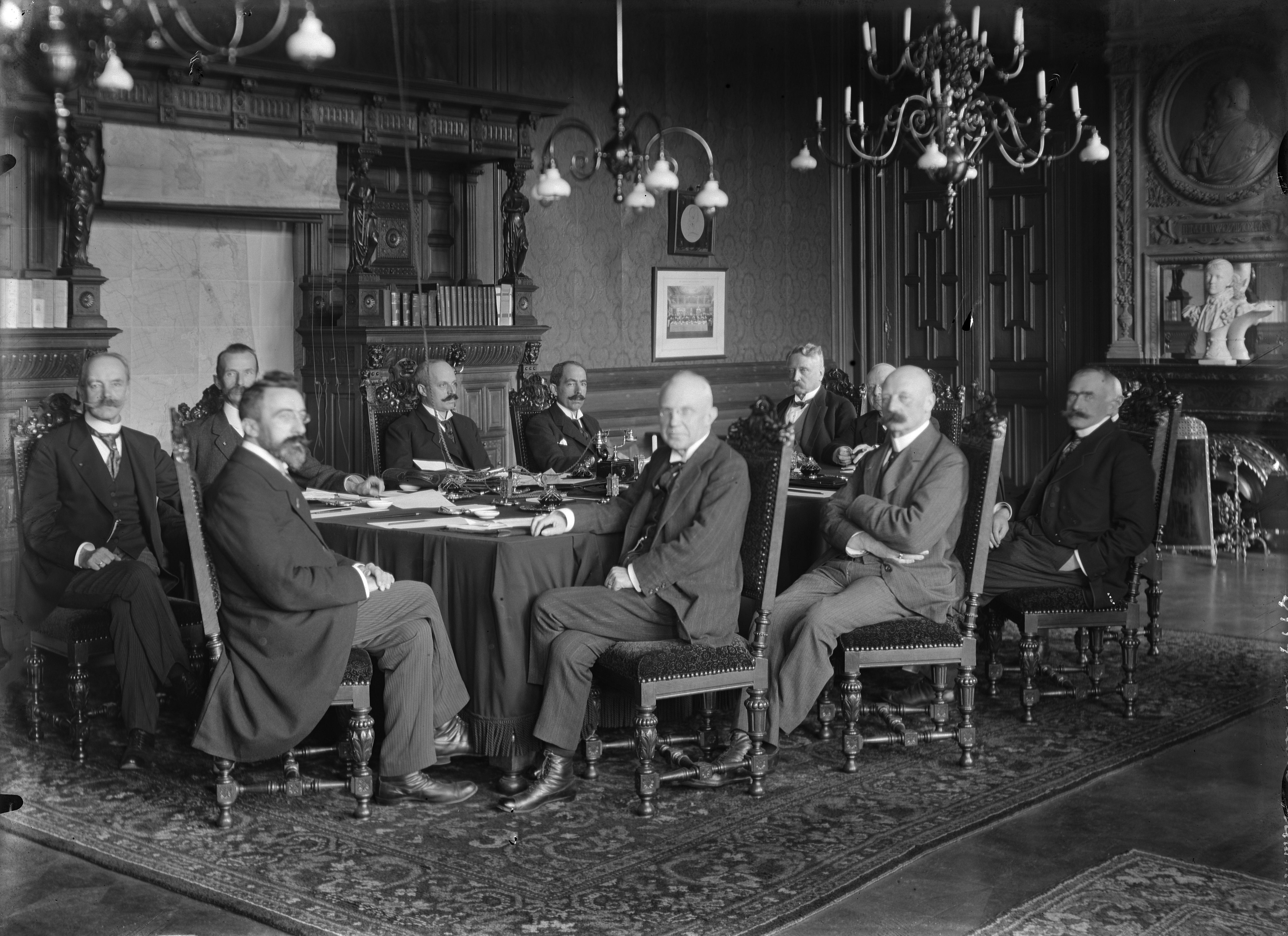
- Meeting of the First Ruijs de Beerenbrouck cabinet in 1918
- Date formed: 9 September 1918
- Date dissolved: 18 September 1922 (Demissionary from 18 July 1922)

People and organisations
- Head of state: Queen Wilhelmina
- Head of government: Charles Ruijs de Beerenbrouck
- No. of ministers: 11
- Ministers removed: 8
- Total no. of members: 17
- Member party: General League; Anti-Revolutionary Party; Christian Historical Union
- Status in legislature: Centre-right majority government

History
- Incoming formation: 1918 formation
- Outgoing formation: 1922 formation
- Election: 1918 general election
- Legislature terms: 1918–1922
- Predecessor: Cort van der Linden cabinet
- Successor: Second Ruijs de Beerenbrouck cabinet

The First Ruijs de Beerenbrouck cabinet was the cabinet of the Netherlands from 9 September 1918 until 18 September 1922. The cabinet was formed by the political parties General League of Roman Catholic Electoral Associations (AB), Anti-Revolutionary Party (ARP) and the Christian Historical Union (CHU) after the election of 1918. The centre-right cabinet was a majority government in the House of Representatives. It was the first of three cabinets of Charles Ruijs de Beerenbrouck as Chairman of the Council of Ministers.

== Composition ==
Title	Minister			Term of office	
Title	Image	Name	Party	Start	End
Chairman of the Council of Ministers; Minister of the Interior	Charles Ruijs de Beerenbrouck	Charles Ruijs de Beerenbrouck	General League	9 September 1918	18 September 1922
Minister of Foreign Affairs	Herman van Karnebeek	Herman van Karnebeek	Indep. (Note: Liberal)	9 September 1918	18 September 1922
Minister of Finance		Simon de Vries	ARP	9 September 1918	28 July 1921
Minister of Finance	Dirk Jan de Geer	Dirk Jan de Geer	CHU	28 July 1921	18 September 1922
Minister of Justice	Theo Heemskerk	Theo Heemskerk	ARP	9 September 1918	18 September 1922
Minister of Agriculture, Industry and Commerce	Hendrik van IJsselsteyn	Hendrik van IJsselsteyn	Indep. (Note: Christian historical)	9 September 1918	13 September 1922
Minister of Agriculture, Industry and Commerce	Charles Ruijs de Beerenbrouck	Charles Ruijs de Beerenbrouck (ad interim)	General League	13 September 1922	18 September 1922
Minister of War	George Alting von Geusau	George Alting von Geusau	General League	9 September 1918	5 January 1920
Minister of War	Charles Ruijs de Beerenbrouck	Charles Ruijs de Beerenbrouck (ad interim)	General League	5 January 1920	31 March 1920
Minister of War	Willem Frederik Pop	Willem Frederik Pop	Indep.	31 March 1920	28 July 1921
Minister of War	Jannes van Dijk	Jannes van Dijk	ARP	28 July 1921	18 September 1922
Minister of Navy	George Alting von Geusau	George Alting von Geusau (ad interim)	General League	9 September 1918	16 September 1918
Minister of Navy	Willem Naudin ten Cate	Willem Naudin ten Cate	Indep.	16 September 1918	19 February 1919
Minister of Navy	Charles Ruijs de Beerenbrouck	Charles Ruijs de Beerenbrouck (ad interim)	General League	19 February 1919	19 April 1919
Minister of Navy	Hendrik Bijleveld	Hendrik Bijleveld	ARP	19 April 1919	5 January 1920
Minister of Navy	Hendrik van IJsselsteyn	Hendrik van IJsselsteyn (ad interim)	Indep.	5 January 1920	31 March 1920
Minister of Navy	Willem Frederik Pop	Willem Frederik Pop	Indep.	31 March 1920	28 July 1921
Minister of Navy	Jannes van Dijk	Jannes van Dijk	ARP	28 July 1921	18 September 1922
Minister of Labour	Piet Aalberse Sr.	Piet Aalberse Sr.	General League	25 September 1918	18 September 1922
Minister of Education, Arts and Sciences	Johannes Theodoor de Visser	Johannes Theodoor de Visser	CHU	25 September 1918	18 September 1922
Minister of Water Management	Adrianus König	Adrianus König	General League	9 September 1918	18 September 1922
Minister of Colonial Affairs	Alexander Idenburg	Alexander Idenburg	ARP	9 September 1918	13 August 1919
Minister of Colonial Affairs	Charles Ruijs de Beerenbrouck	Charles Ruijs de Beerenbrouck (ad interim)	General League	13 August 1919	13 November 1919
Minister of Colonial Affairs	Simon de Graaff	Simon de Graaff	Indep. (Note: Conservative (Protestant))	13 November 1919	18 September 1922

== See also ==
- 1921 Dutch cabinet formation, reconstruction of the cabinet after a cabinet crisis
