= 1918 Dutch cabinet formation =

Formation of the first Ruijs de Beerenbrouck cabinet

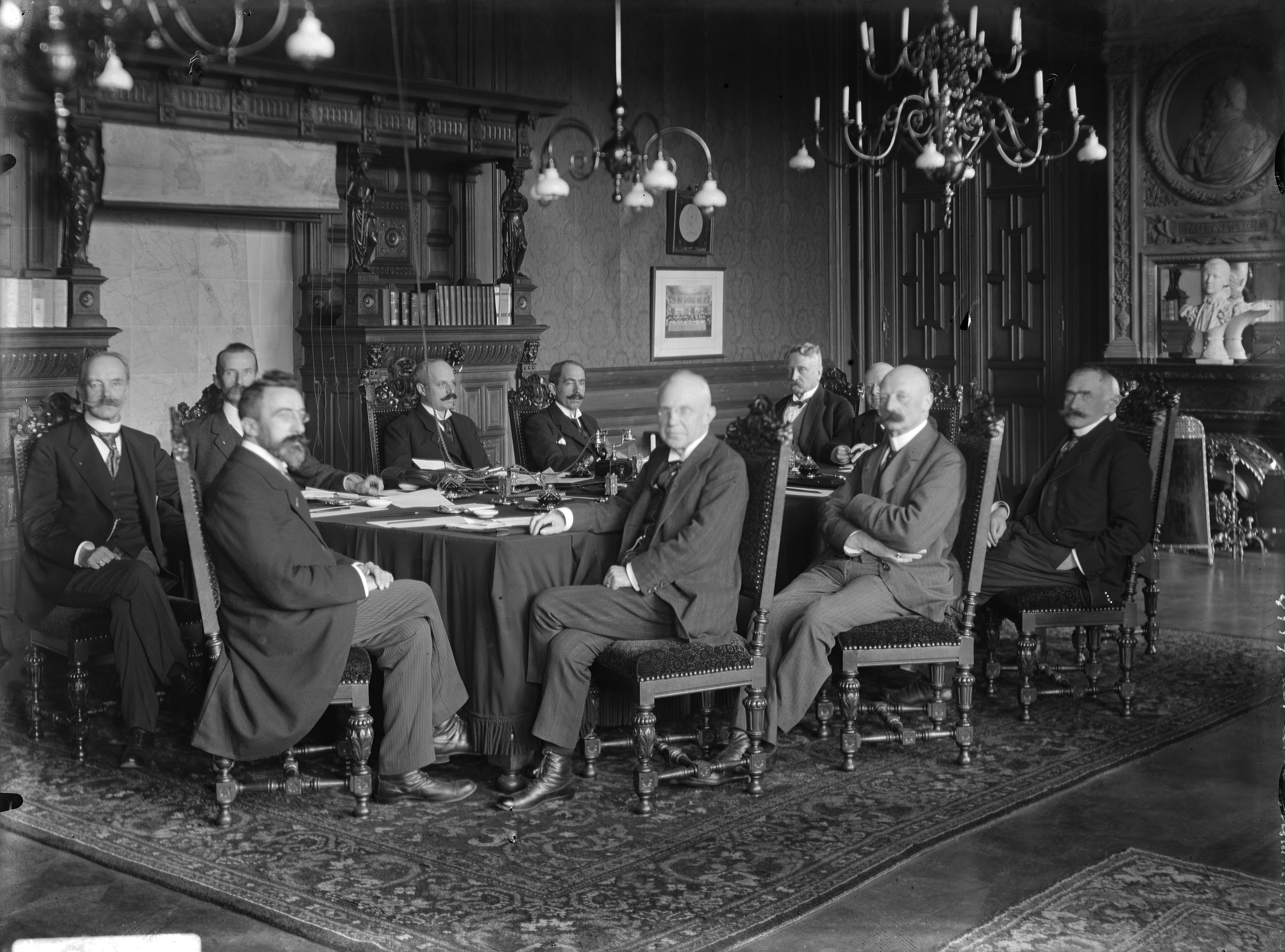
Council of Ministers of the first Ruijs de Beerenbrouck cabinet

A cabinet formation took place in Netherlands after the general election of 3 July 1918. The formation led to the swearing-in of the first Ruijs de Beerenbrouck cabinet on 9 September 1918, compromising the General League of Roman Catholic Electoral Associations (AB), the Anti-Revolutionary Party (ARP) and the Christian Historical Union (CHU).

== Background ==
During the First World War, in which the Netherlands remained neutral, the Cort van der Linden cabinet, led by the liberal Pieter Cort van der Linden, was in power. Despite some right-wing and left-wing politicians advocating for the cabinet's continuity due to the ongoing war, queen Wilhelmina desired a new government. She believed the current cabinet was exhausted, particularly concerning food supply issues. Before the elections, she discussed the formation of a new cabinet with ARP politician Alexander Willem Frederik Idenburg and CHU politician Alexander de Savornin Lohman, both of whom rejected the plan. She also attempted to appoint former ARP minister Hendrik Colijn as a minister without portfolio, but he declined, citing his inability to abruptly resign as director of Bataafse Petroleum Maatschappij.

=== Election results ===
Seat composition of the newly elected House of Representatives during the formation: SP: 1 SDP: 2 SDAP: 22 CSP: 1 BCS: 1 CDP: 1 MP: 1 NP: 1 VDW: 1 PB: 1 VDB: 5 EB: 3 BVL: 4 LU: 6 ARP: 13 CHU: 7 AB: 30

The general election of 3 July 1918 was the first to use proportional representation instead of electoral districts. As a result, many smaller parties gained representation in the House. The right-wing parties, collectively known as the Coalition, included the General League of Roman Catholic Electoral Associations (AB, 30 seats), Anti-Revolutionary Party (ARP, 13 seats) and Christian Historical Union (CHU, 7 seats), together securing 50 seats. The left-wing parties, known as the Concentration, comprised among others the Social Democratic Workers' Party (SDAP, 22 seats) and Liberal Union (LU, 6 seats), also totalling 50 seats. As a result, no clear majority combination emerged.

== Consultations ==
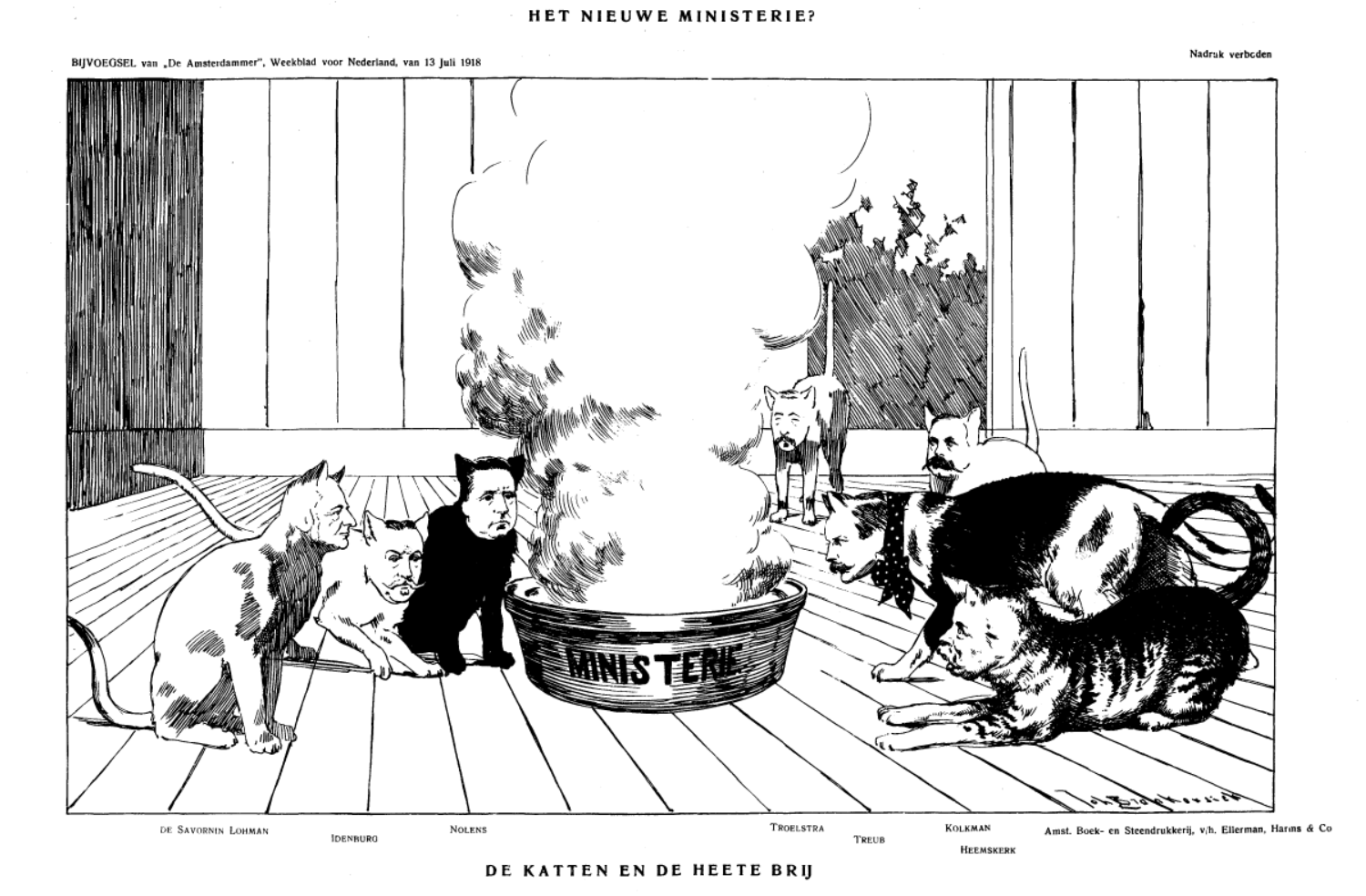
Cartoon by Johan Braakensiek in De Amsterdammer about the cabinet formation. Willem Hubert Nolens, Alexander Willem Frederik Idenburg, Alexander de Savornin Lohman, Pieter Jelles Troelstra, Willem Treub, Maximilien Joseph Caspar Marie Kolkman and Theo Heemskerk depicted as cats walking around the hot mess ("ministry")

The AB, led in the House of Representatives by the priest Willem Hubert Nolens, advocated for a right-wing cabinet. Coenraad van der Voort van Zijp led the ARP parliamentary group in the House of Representatives, but the formation efforts were primarily driven by Alexander Willem Frederik Idenburg. Given the election results, Idenburg pushed for a mixed cabinet, formed by a left-wing statesman with some support from the right, but without a prominent role for the ARP. He feared that a disappointing right-wing cabinet, lacking a real majority, would harm the ARP and CHU electorally The CHU, led by Alexander de Savornin Lohman, who had strong connections with Idenburg, Heemskerk, and Colijn, opposed Idenburg's plan, particularly the expectation that the CHU would support such a mixed cabinet.

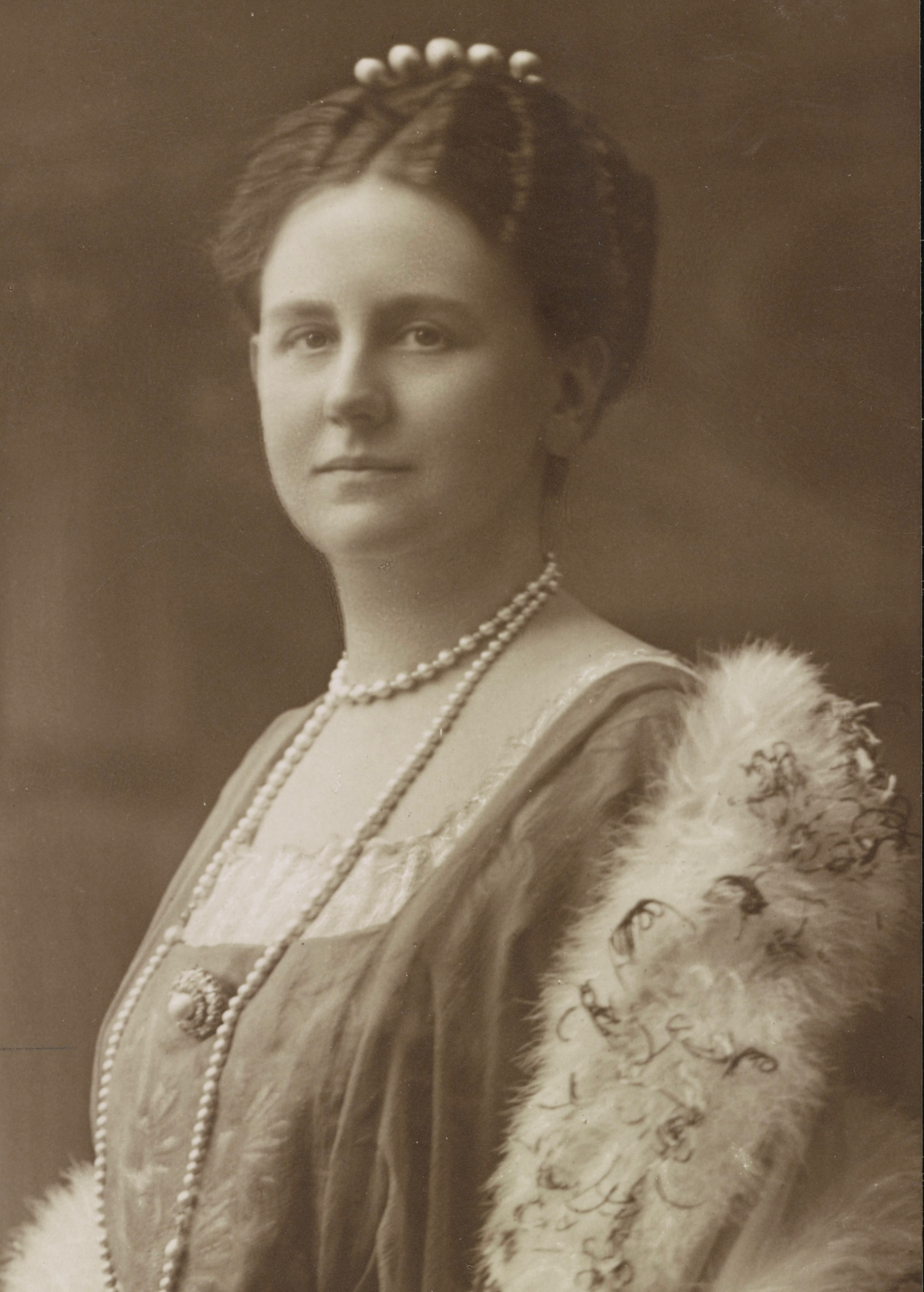
Queen Wilhelmina of the Netherlands, 1913

After consulting her permanent advisors and the right-wing parliamentary group leaders, Wilhelmina instructed the three right-wing parliamentary group leaders to reach a joint recommendation. During a meeting on 9 July, these leaders suggested exploring the possibility of forming a right-wing cabinet, contingent on the left's rejection of participation. Wilhelmina then asked speaker of the House of Representatives Dirk Fock (LU) to gauge the opinions of the left-wing leaders. After consulting Pieter Jelles Troelstra (SDAP), Henri Marchant (VDB) and Alibert Cornelis Visser van IJzendoorn (BVL), Fock recommended on 12 July the formation of a right-wing cabinet led by a Catholic formateur.

== Formateur Nolens ==
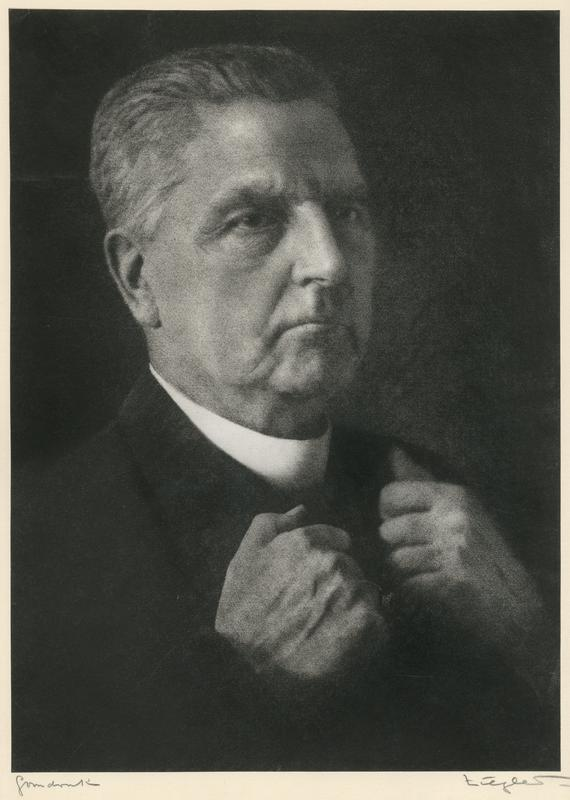
Formateur Willem Hubert Nolens

Nolens wanted a Catholic formateur. Although he was willing to take on the role himself, being a Catholic priest made this an unlikely choice, and he did not want a position in the cabinet. The idea of a Catholic formateur – and especially a prime minister – was very sensitive for the ARP. Nolens rejected the proposal to appoint Lohman alongside him. Subsequently, Lohman and Nolens suggested making Idenburg the formateur and prime minister. Idenburg declined, stating that he might accept the minister of Colonial Affairs, given his experience as a former governor-general of the Dutch East Indies, but this was incompatible with the premiership. With Idenburg's refusal, Wilhelmina gave the formateur assignment to Nolens on 13 July.

Nolens's primary task was to find a prime minister to whom he could transfer the formateurship. He proposed the Catholic Governor of Limburg, Charles Ruijs de Beerenbrouck, but this was rejected by Colijn and Lohman. Lohman introduced former ARP Prime Minister Theo Heemskerk, but he did not gain Nolens's support. On 17 July, Nolens agreed, under certain conditions, that the 81-year-old Lohman could assume the prime ministership combined with the Ministry of the Interior, from which Education would be split off. Lohman then effectively began working as a formateur. However, he soon had second thoughts and informed Nolens on 21 July that he would definitively renounce the premiership.

Although the search for a prime minister stalled, candidates were approached for several ministerial posts. Former Catholic Member of Parliament Piet Aalberse expressed interest in becoming Minister of Labour. Minister of War Bonifacius Cornelis de Jonge (CHU) was willing to remain in the new cabinet, although this was later objected to by the Queen. For the Finance portfolio, Nolens approached Treasurer-General Leonardus Trip, who ultimately declined. Octaaf van Nispen tot Sevenaer, the Catholic envoy to the Holy See in Rome, was invited to join the Ministry of Foreign Affairs but turned down the offer. CHU Member of Parliament Dirk Jan de Geer was considered for the Education portfolio but also declined.

Despite the objections, Nolens asked Ruijs on 27 July if he was willing to become prime minister. Ruijs wanted time to consider and did not immediately respond. On 30 July, the Queen herself appeared to have approached Van Nispen to return to the Netherlands and asked if he was willing to become prime minister. However, it was not until 15 August that Van Nispen arrived in The Hague, where he declined the premiership for health reasons. The queen then sought the freedom to appoint a new formateur – considering Colijn herself – and requested Nolens to return his assignment on 19 August.

== Interim consultations ==
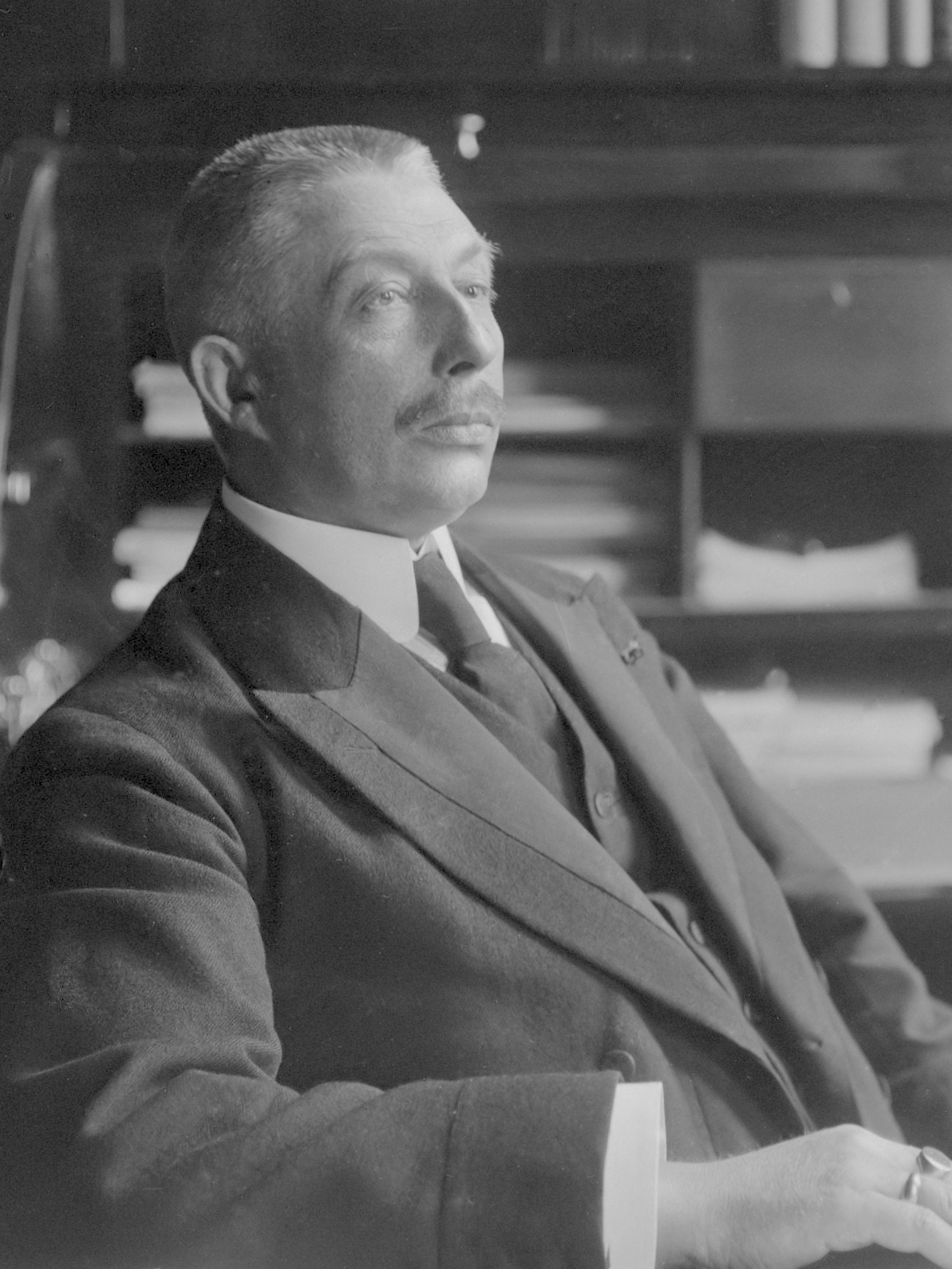
Hendrik Colijn, 1913

Immediately after Nolens's assignment ended, the formateurship was offered to Lohman, who again refused. It was arranged that she would publicly offer him the assignment, allowing him to refuse it the next day. The next day, the queen privately offered the formateurship to Colijn, who agreed only if he could remain an unpaid director of the Bataafsche Petroleum Maatschappij alongside prime minister. Although Lohman and Van der Voort van Zijp saw some merit in this, Nolens and Cort van der Linden reacted negatively, as this would mean that the leader of the cabinet would be associated with a "capitalist-imperialist" enterprise. Consequently, Colijn declined the assignment on 20 August.

In the final conversation, Colijn mentioned that the ARP parliamentary group questioned whether a strong right-wing cabinet could still be formed following the rejections by Nolens, Lohman, and himself. There was also discussions about a mixed cabinet. The queen urged the parliamentary group to decide quickly. On 23 August, the ARP majority supported a mixed cabinet. However, Nolens indicated that the AB would oppose such a cabinet. After Colijn relayed this, the parliamentary group reconsidered, refraining from ruling out a right-wing cabinet. Catholics also opposed an extra-parliamentary cabinet. The remaining option was to form a right-wing cabinet, with the question of who should be the prime minister still unresolved. The candidates were Ruijs de Beerenbrouck and Heemskerk. Eventually, the CHU parliamentary group dropped their objections to Ruijs de Beerenbrouck. On 29 August, the queen appointed Ruijs de Beerenbrouck as formateur.

== Formateur Ruijs de Beerenbrouck ==
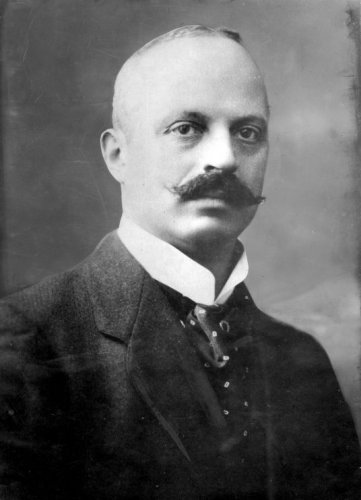
Formateur Charles Ruijs de Beerenbrouck

On 30 August, Ruijs began talks with former formateur Nolens and other key figures like Colijn, Idenburg, and Heemskerk. Building on Nolens's groundwork, Ruijs filled most ministerial positions. He had a constructive discussion with Lohman, a long-time opponent of his appointment, and asked Lohman to approach CHU party chairman Johannes Theodoor de Visser for the Ministry of Education, which De Visser accepted. However, De Jonge refused to continue as Minister of War. Catholic George August Alexander Alting von Geusau was approached but only accepted if the department would not be merged with the Ministry of the Navy.

On 2 September, the prospective ministers of the nearly completed cabinet gathered for a meeting. The session began with the announcement that W.C.J. Smit would decline the position of Minister of the Navy. W.J.G. van Umgrove was approached as a replacement but declared during the meeting that he would not accept the role. Eventually, naval officer and sympathizer of the CHU, Willem Naudin ten Cate, agreed to take the position. Trip was also present at the meeting, but expressed willingness to accept the Minister of Finance post only if no one else took it. Trip strongly opposed the proposed budgets for the War and Navy departments, arguing for significant reductions. Despite discussions during the meeting, Trip maintained his stance on budget limitations. Around 3 p.m., as it became clear that no compromise could be reached, he left the meeting.

The search for a replacement in the Finance portfolio posed a serious risk to the entire formation process. De Geer, who was unavailable for this role, was considered as a backup at Lohman's request. However, the anti-revolutionaries and Christian historicals could not identify a suitable alternative from within their ranks, and they were reluctant to accept another Catholic minister. There was a brief consideration to offer Heemskerk the Finance portfolio instead of Justice, but no suitable candidate was available for the latter role either. Queen Wilhelmina attempted to persuade De Geer without success. ARP MP Frederik Herman de Monté verLoren was approached next but declined as well. Eventually, after pressure was applied, Amsterdam councillor Simon de Vries Czn (ARP) reluctantly agreed to become Minister of Finance.

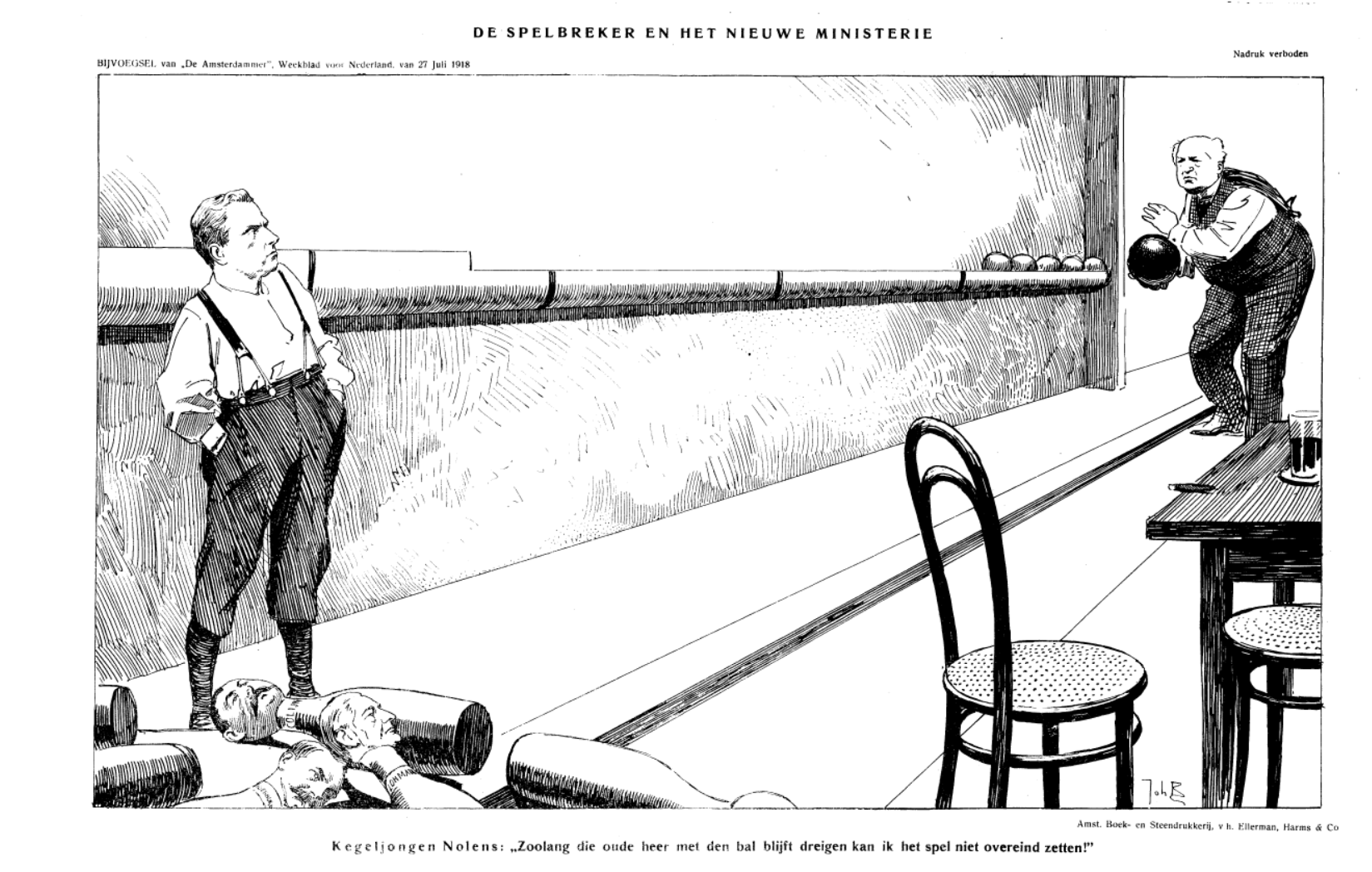
Cartoon by Johan Braakensiek in De Amsterdammer of 27 July 1918. Abraham Kuyper bowls pins with the heads of, among others, Hendrik Colijn and Alexander de Savornin Lohman, while Willem Hubert Nolens tries to correct this

During the formation process, former Prime Minister and ARP party chairman Abraham Kuyper wielded influence, particularly through his role as editor-in-chief of De Standaard. He believed that the anti-revolutionaries, especially Idenburg, should not join a cabinet led by Catholics. On 6 September, upon learning that the right-wing cabinet was nearing completion, Kuyper expressed dissatisfaction towards Idenburg, Colijn, and Heemskerk. Given Kuyper's popularity among Anti-Revolutionary supporters, there was concern that his discontent expressed in De Standaard could jeopardize the formation process.

On 7 September, Ruijs de Beerenbrouck contacted Kuyper and visited him in an attempt to address these concerns. The meeting was cordial, but Kuyper remained firm in his view that the ARP should not participate in the cabinet and could not promise support. The following day, Kuyper's party colleague Colijn also visited him. The outcome was more positive, but still without a firm commitment. Ultimately, the cabinet proceeded with confidence only after Colijn, who like Kuyper held considerable sway within the ARP, agreed to publicly support the cabinet if Kuyper criticised it unfavorably. On 9 September Ruijs de Beerenbrouck reported the formation result to the queen. That same afternoon, the first Ruijs de Beerenbrouck cabinet was sworn in.

== Aftermath ==
After the formation of the cabinet, Kuyper commented on it in De Standaard, though he refrained from launching a direct attack. The narrow majority led to several ministerial crises, ultimately resulting in the cabinet's collapse in 1921. Following another round of cabinet formation, it was reconstructed and continued in office until shortly after the general election held on 5 July 1922.
