= Minister of the Colonies =

Minister of the Colonies refers to a government minister responsible for a nation's imperial colonies. Examples include:

- Belgium – Minister of the Colonies
- France – Minister of the Overseas
- German Empire – List of German colonial ministers
- Kingdom of Italy – Minister of the Colonies
- Netherlands – Minister of the Colonies
- United Kingdom – Secretary of State for the Colonies

== See also ==
- Ministry of the Colonies (disambiguation)
