= Ministry of the Colonies =

Ministry of the Colonies may refer to:

Government department or ministry with "colony" or a derivative in its name:

- France – Ministry of the Colonies
- German Empire – Imperial Colonial Office
- Kingdom of Italy – Ministry of the Colonies, the ministry of the government of the Kingdom of Italy responsible for the government of the country's colonial possessions and the direction of their economies
- Empire of Japan – Ministry of Colonial Affairs
- Netherlands – Ministry of the Colonies
- Portugal – Ministry of the Colonies
- United Kingdom – Colonial Office

Similar government organizations without using the word "colony":

- France – Minister of the Overseas
- Portugal – Overseas Ministry
- Spain – Ministry of Overseas
- United States – Office of Insular Affairs

== See also ==
- Minister of the Colonies (disambiguation)
