= Braakensiek =

Braakensiek is a surname. Notable people with the surname include:

- Annalise Braakensiek (1972–2019), Australian model, actress, television presenter, businesswoman, and campaign ambassador
- Johan Braakensiek (1858–1940), Dutch painter
