= Nolens Doctrine =

Principle in the politics of the Netherlands

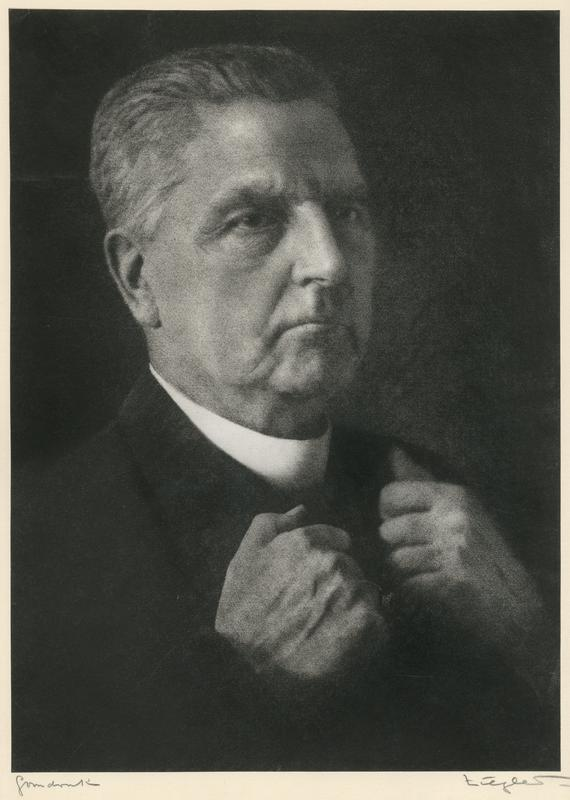
Willem Hubert Nolens

The Nolens Doctrine is a principle in politics of the Netherlands that Catholics should only collaborate with the Social Democratic Workers' Party (SDAP) in the cabinet in cases of "utmost necessity."

== Background ==
The doctrine refers to the leader of the General League of Roman Catholic Electoral Associations, Willem Hubert Nolens. He articulated this principle in 1922 after the League's board sought to forbid cooperation. Nolens' aim was not to exclude collaboration with the social democrats but rather to leave the door slightly open. Towards the end of the interwar period, the doctrine lost its significance as the rise of fascism and the economic crisis led the SDAP to adopt a more responsible stance, removing several ideological obstacles. This resulted in the formation of the second De Geer cabinet in August 1939, which included both the SDAP and the League's successor, the Roman Catholic State Party (RKSP).

After World War II, the phrase "utmost necessity" was often referenced when the successor of the RKSP, the Catholic People's Party (KVP), did or did not form a coalition with the successor of the SDAP, the Labour Party (PvdA). Political scientist Hans Daudt formalized this into a theory in 1980 (also known as the Daudt doctrine), but it is generally rejected within political science.
