= Second Ruijs de Beerenbrouck cabinet =

Cabinet of the Netherlands, 1922 to 1925

- Cabinet of the Netherlands
- Date formed: 18 September 1922
- Date dissolved: 4 August 1925 (Demissionary from 1 July 1925)

People and organisations
- Head of state: Queen Wilhelmina
- Head of government: Charles Ruijs de Beerenbrouck
- No. of ministers: 10
- Ministers removed: 1
- Total no. of members: 11
- Member party: General League; Anti-Revolutionary Party; Christian Historical Union
- Status in legislature: Centre-right majority government

History
- Incoming formation: 1922 Dutch cabinet formation
- Outgoing formation: 1925 Dutch cabinet formation
- Election: 1922 general election
- Legislature terms: 1922–1925
- Predecessor: First Ruijs de Beerenbrouck cabinet
- Successor: First Colijn cabinet

The Second Ruijs de Beerenbrouck cabinet was the cabinet of the Netherlands from 18 September 1922 until 4 August 1925. The cabinet was formed by the political parties General League of Roman Catholic Electoral Associations (AB), Anti-Revolutionary Party (ARP) and the Christian Historical Union (CHU) after the 1922 general election. The centre-right cabinet was a majority government in the House of Representatives and was a continuation of the previous Cabinet Ruijs de Beerenbrouck I. It was the second of three cabinets of Charles Ruijs de Beerenbrouck as Chairman of the Council of Ministers.

== Composition ==
Composition
Title	Minister			Term of office	
Title	Image	Name	Party	Start	End
Chairman of the Council of Ministers; Minister of the Interior	Charles Ruijs de Beerenbrouck	Charles Ruijs de Beerenbrouck	General League	18 September 1922	4 August 1925
Minister of Foreign Affairs	Herman van Karnebeek	Herman van Karnebeek	Indep. (Note: Liberal)	18 September 1922	4 August 1925
Minister of Finance	Dirk Jan de Geer	Dirk Jan de Geer	CHU	18 September 1922	11 August 1923
Minister of Finance	Hendrikus Colijn	Hendrikus Colijn	ARP	11 August 1923	4 August 1925
Minister of Justice	Theo Heemskerk	Theo Heemskerk	ARP	18 September 1922	4 August 1925
Minister of Labour (1922–1923); Minister of Labour, Commerce and Industry (1923–1925)	Piet Aalberse Sr.	Piet Aalberse Sr.	General League	18 September 1922	4 August 1925
Minister of War	Jannes van Dijk	Jannes van Dijk	ARP	18 September 1922	4 August 1925
Minister of the Navy		Evert Pieter Westerveld	Indep.	18 September 1922	4 August 1925
Minister of Education, Arts and Sciences	Johannes Theodoor de Visser	Johannes Theodoor de Visser	CHU	18 September 1922	4 August 1925
Minister of Water Management	Gerard van Swaay	Gerard van Swaay	General League	18 September 1922	4 August 1925
Minister of Colonial Affairs	Simon de Graaff	Simon de Graaff	Indep. (Note: Conservative (Protestant))	18 September 1922	4 August 1925
