= Justus van Maurik =

Dutch author and cigar maker

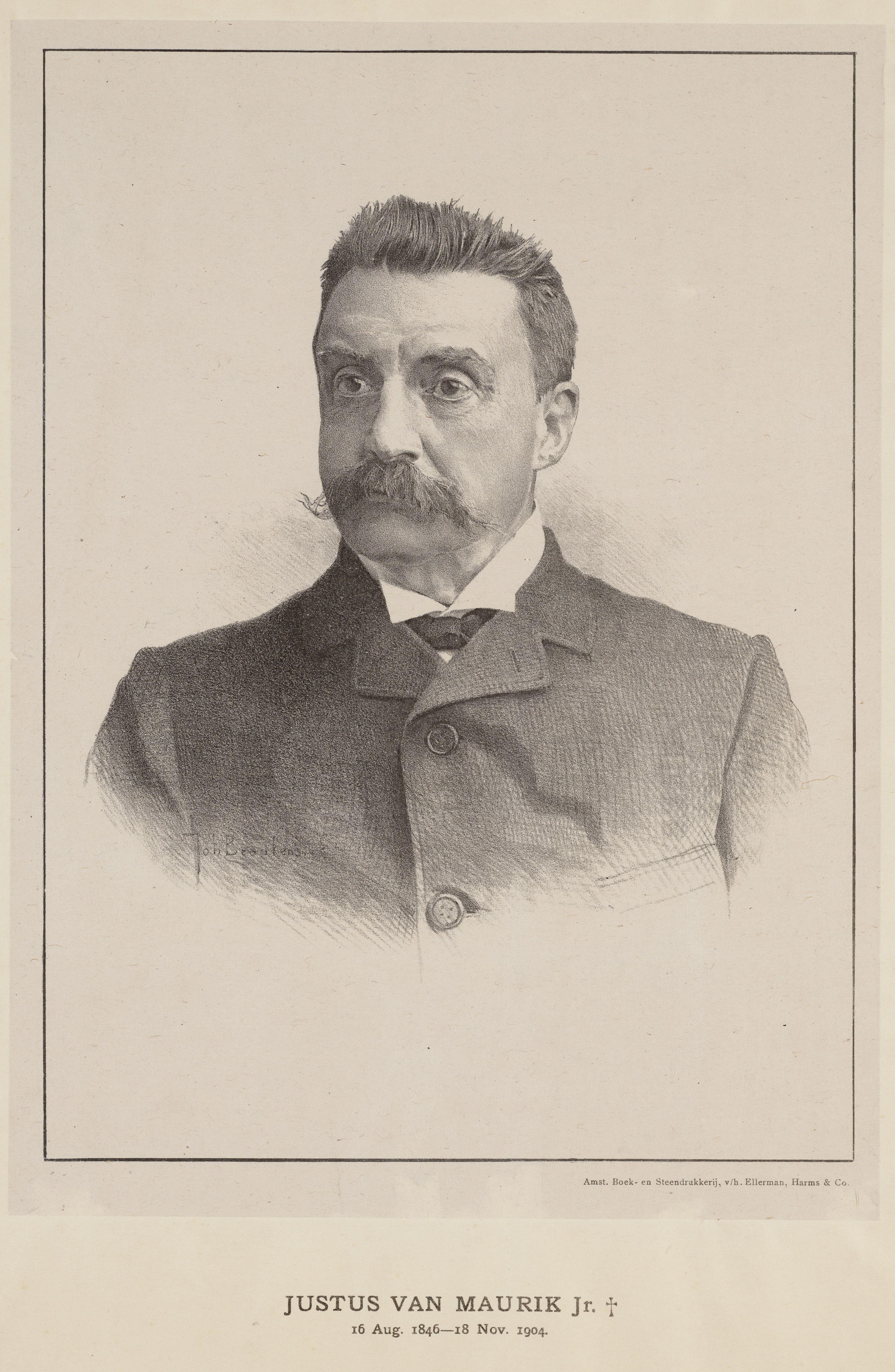
Justus van Maurik

Justus van Maurik (16 August 1846, in Amsterdam – 18 November 1904) was a Dutch author and cigar maker. He was the grandson of Justus van Maurik Sr.

Justus was known as a writer of farces and humorous plays. In 1878, he published his first novel, Mie de porster. He subsequently wrote hundreds of books. Many of his books were illustrated by the graphic artist Johan Braakensiek.

In 1877, Maurik co-created De Amsterdammer, a newspaper targeted toward audiences in trade, industry and art. The newspaper has now changed its name to the weekly De Groene Amsterdammer.

== Works ==
- Een bittere pil (1873)
- Mie de porster (1878)
- Janus Tulp (1879, play)
- Uit het volk (1879)
- Van allerlei slag (1881)
- Fijne Beschuiten (1883, play)
- Met z'n achten (1883)
- Burgerluidjes (1884)
- Uit één pen (1886)
- Krates (1887?)
- Papieren kinderen (1888)
- Amsterdam bij dag en nacht (1889)
- Indrukken van een Tòtòk (1897)
- Novellen en schetsen (1900)
- Toen ik nog jong was (1901) about Jacob Frederik Muller and the Amsterdam neighborhood Fort van Sjako.
- Joris Komijn op de Tentoonstelling
- Op reis en thuis
- Stille menschen
- Verspreide Novellen
- Amsterdam bij dag en nacht
- Het Amsterdam van Justus van Maurik
- Novellen losse reisschetsen
- Novellen Toon Toos en de Opera
- Novellen De Laatste der Oempah's
- Novellen Het genootschap Leuterburg
- Novellen Een vergeten schuld
- De Buren 1875 toneelstuk
- Janus Tulp 1879 toneelstuk
- Pakketten voor Dames 1880 play
- Gewichtige dagen 1830-1831 play
- Françoises opstel 1887 play
- Anarchisten tonelstuk
- Plicht toneelstuk
- De Planetenjuffrouw 1902 play
- Men Zegt..... 1885 play
- Tijdschift "Ons Amsterdam" 1994 no 6 (Het Amsterdam van J v M.)
- Uit het leven van Justus van Maurik 1846 - 1904 (J.H. Rössing)
