= Simon de Graaff =

Dutch politician (1861–1948)

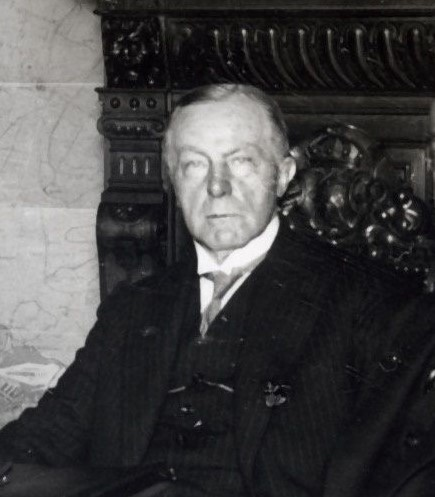

Minister of the Colonies
- In office 13 November 1919 – 4 August 1929
- Prime Minister: Charles Ruijs de Beerenbrouck
- Preceded by: Charles Ruijs de Beerenbrouck (interim)
- Succeeded by: Hendrikus Colijn

Minister of the Colonies
- In office 10 August 1929 – 26 May 1933
- Prime Minister: Charles Ruijs de Beerenbrouck
- Preceded by: Jacob Christiaan Koningsberger
- Succeeded by: Hendrikus Colijn

Personal details
- Born: 24 August 1861 Lisse, South Holland, Netherlands
- Died: 2 October 1948 (aged 87) Oegstgeest, South Holland, Netherlands
- Party: Independent

Simon de Graaff (24 August 1861 – 2 October 1948) was a Dutch politician who served as the Minister of the Colonies in the first, second, and third cabinets of Charles Ruijs de Beerenbrouck. An independent politician of Protestant faith, he had conservative leanings. During his tenure, he promoted the administrative reform of the Dutch East Indies and passed a new constitution for the colony.

== Early life ==
De Graaff was born in Lisse, South Holland, the Netherlands on 24 August 1861, to the florist Adrianus de Graaff and his wife Wilhelmina Henriette Jeannette van Dingstée. He studied in Leiden, where he graduated from a Hogere Burgerschool. In 1883, after several years of self study, he completed an examination for aspiring civil servants of the Dutch East Indies.

Soon thereafter, de Graaff departed for the Indies. In 1887, after several years in low-level positions, he was appointed the aspirant comptroller of the Surabaya Residency. He was transferred to Buitenzorg (now Bogor) the following year, and in this city he participated in studies of land-rent schemes and labour. He was made comptroller first class in 1896, the year that he began a two-year sabbatical in the Netherlands.

Returning to the Indies in 1898, de Graaff was placed on a committee overseeing the prices paid to sugar producers by the major companies; he also joined one that investigated poverty amongst Indo–Europeans. Such activities led to a 1905 appointment as inspector for agricultural affairs; at the same time, de Graaff served as deputy director of domestic administration under D. F. W. van Rees. He served as the director of that agency between 1906 and 1910.

== Administrative reform ==
Around 1905, de Graaff began developing an extensive plan to reorganize the administration of the Indies, thereby facilitating governance by allowing decisions at lower levels. He initially sought to divide the residencies of Java into three governates, as well as use indigenous civil servants in lower levels. However, the Ministry of the Colonies perceived this plan as undermining Dutch influence. A revised proposal, Nota over eene hervorming van het bestuurswezen in Nederlandsch-Indië (Note on the Reform of the Administrative System in the Dutch East Indies, 1909), was released; in it, De Graaff removed mentions of extending influence to indigenous workers. Elements of this plan were announced for implementation by Minister Jan Hendrik de Waal Malefijt.

On 1 July 1910, de Graaff was granted leave to return to the Netherlands. After some time as a reviewer of legal documents, he returned to the Indies in 1913. Made a member of the Council of the Indies, he also served as the commissioner responsible for the reorganization of the administrative services in the colony. He held this latter role until 1 February 1915, when he resigned from the civil service. Thomas Bastiaan Pleyte, who had become Minister of the Colonies in 1913, sought political reform, including the establishment of a house of representatives, and these goals were not fully aligned with de Graaff's reforms. By 1917, he was chairing the Dutch Export Company.

== Minister of the Colonies and death ==
On 13 November 1919, de Graaff was made the Minister of the Colonies as part of the first cabinet of Prime Minister Charles Ruijs de Beerenbrouck. He thus replaced Alexander Idenburg, who had resigned due to health problems; the prime minister had held the position ad interim since August. De Graaff remained minister until the dissolution of the second cabinet on 4 August 1929. De Graaff, an independent politician of Protestant faith who had conservative leanings, gained a reputation for attention to detail and was nicknamed "Pietje Precies" ("Precise Pete"); every night, he would read and comment upon multitudes of documents that were delivered to his home by bicycle.

Under de Graaff's leadership, the Ministry of the Colonies passed the Administrative Reform Act of 1922 and the Indies Constitution Act of 1925. The former divided Java into three provinces – East Java, Central Java, and West Java – under which municipal and regency governments operated. The latter, meanwhile, rearranged the Volksraad while still maintaining a European majority; it was unpopular with the burgeoning nationalist movement.

In 1921, de Graaff faced controversy after the exploitation of oil in Jambi was granted to the Bataafse Petroleum Maatschappij, to the exclusion of Standard Oil of New Jersey, despite the latter's efforts to seek a concession. Several letters were exchanged between the Dutch and United States governments, and in 1922 the United States Secretary of the Interior Albert Fall identified the Netherlands as a "non-reciprocating country".

Following the collapse of the Dirk Jan de Geer government, Ruijs de Beerenbrouck established his third cabinet on 10 August 1929. De Graaff was again made Minister of the Colonies, holding the position until 26 May 1933. In 1932, he introduced a plan to expand administrative reform beyond Java; although delayed by the Great Depression, these plans were ultimately realized in Sumatra, Borneo, and the Great East in 1938. In regards to the nationalist movement, de Graaff hoped for the Indies to ultimately become independent within the Dutch State. He was also opposed to the pardoning of the nationalist Sukarno, who had been accused of trying to overthrow the colonial government.

De Graaff died in Oegstgeest, South Holland, on 2 October 1948. He had been married to Adriana Maria Naessens on 27 August 1892. The couple had no children.

== Works cited ==
- Anderson Jr., Irvine H. (2015). The Standard-Vacuum Oil Company and United States East Asian Policy, 1933–1941. Princeton, New Jersey: Princeton University Press. ISBN 9781400867004.
- "De Opvolger van Minister Idenburg" [The Successor of Minister Idenburg]. De courant (in Dutch). Amsterdam. 12 November 1919. p. 5.
- Fasseur, C. "Graaff, Simon de (1861–1948)" (in Dutch). Huygens Institute for the History of the Netherlands. Archived from the original on 31 October 2019.
- "Jhr.Mr. Ch.J.M. (Charles) Ruijs de Beerenbrouck" (in Dutch). Parlementair Documentatie Centrum. Archived from the original on 14 February 2021.
- "S. (Simon) de Graaff" (in Dutch). Parlementair Documentatie Centrum. Archived from the original on 31 October 2019.
- "Simon de Graaff". Encyclopedia Britannica. Archived from the original on 29 September 2022.

Political offices
| Preceded by Charles Ruijs de Beerenbrouck interim | Minister of Colonial Affairs; 1919–1925; 1929–1933 | Succeeded by Hendrikus Colijn |
| Preceded by Jacob Christiaan Koningsberger | Minister of Colonial Affairs; 1919–1925; 1929–1933 | Succeeded by Hendrikus Colijn |
