= Piet Aalberse Sr. =

Dutch politician (1871–1948)

His Excellency Piet Aalberse
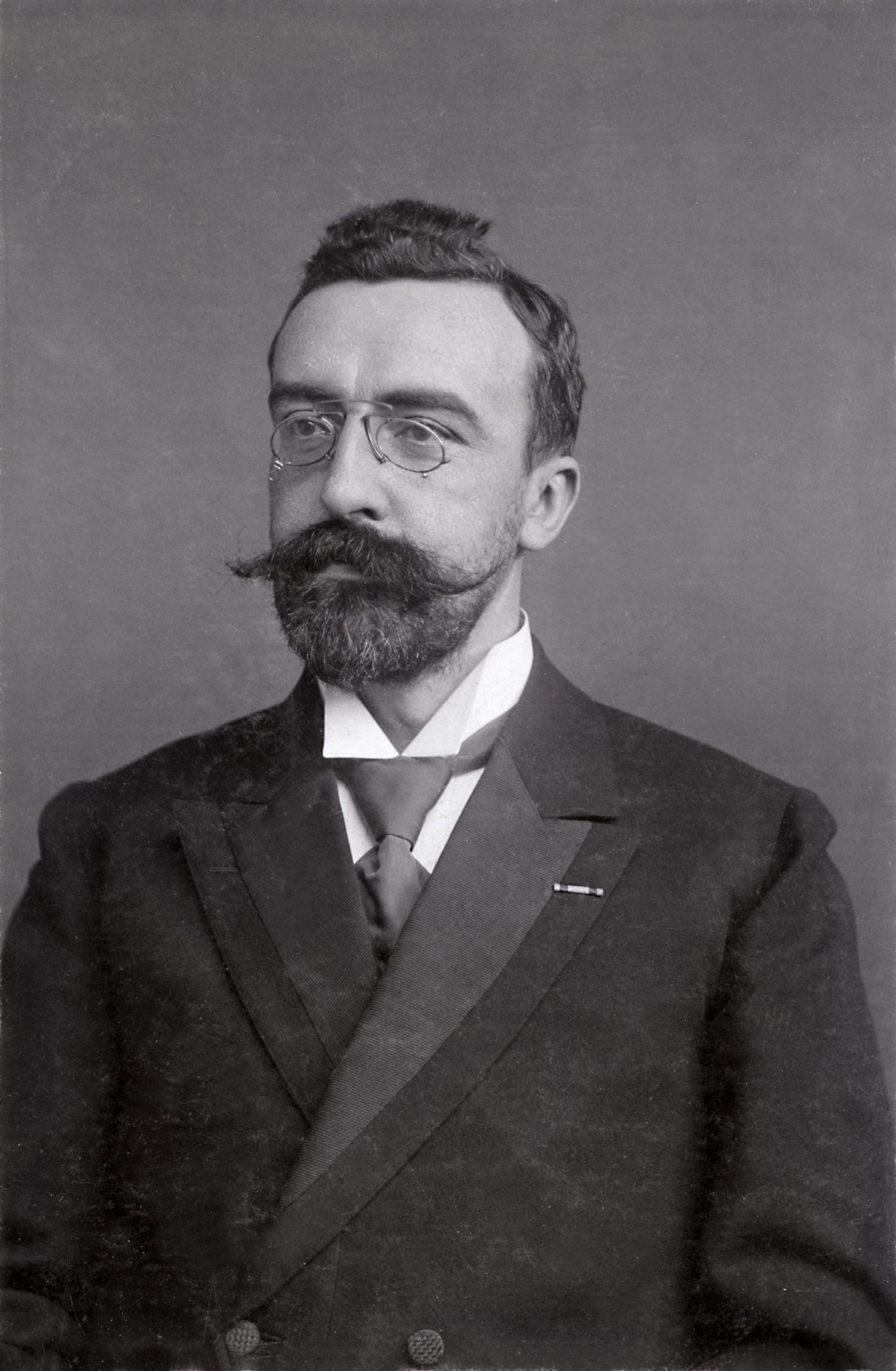
- Aalberse in 1918

Member of the Council of State
- In office 10 November 1937 – 1 April 1946
- Vice President: Frans Beelaerts van Blokland

Speaker of the House of Representatives
- In office 7 May 1936 – 9 November 1937
- Preceded by: Charles Ruijs de Beerenbrouck
- Succeeded by: Josef van Schaik

Leader of the Roman Catholic State Party
- In office 15 September 1931 – 7 May 1936
- Preceded by: Wiel Nolens
- Succeeded by: Carel Goseling

Parliamentary leader in the House of Representatives
- In office 15 September 1931 – 7 May 1936
- Preceded by: Wiel Nolens
- Succeeded by: Carel Goseling

Minister of Labour, Commerce and Industry
- In office 1 January 1923 – 4 August 1925
- Prime Minister: Charles Ruijs de Beerenbrouck
- Preceded by: Charles Ruijs de Beerenbrouck as Minister of Agriculture, Commerce and Industry; Himself as Minister of Labour
- Succeeded by: Dionysius Koolen

Minister of Labour
- In office 25 September 1918 – 1 January 1923
- Prime Minister: Charles Ruijs de Beerenbrouck
- Preceded by: Office established
- Succeeded by: Himself as Minister of Labour, Commerce and Industry

Member of the House of Representatives
- In office 15 September 1925 – 9 November 1937
- In office 24 February 1903 – 21 June 1916

Personal details
- Born: Petrus Josephus Mattheus Aalberse; 27 March 1871 Leiden, Netherlands
- Died: 5 July 1948 (aged 77) The Hague, Netherlands
- Party: Catholic People's Party (from 1945)
- Other political affiliations: Roman Catholic State Party (1926–1945); General League (until 1926)
- Spouse: Elisabeth Schmier (m. 1898)
- Children: Piet Aalberse Jr. (1910–1989) and 7 daughters
- Education: Leiden University
- Occupation: Politician · Jurist · Lawyer · Researcher · Academic administrator · Editor · Author · Professor

Petrus Josephus Mattheus "Piet" Aalberse Sr. (27 March 1871 – 5 July 1948) was a Dutch Catholic politician and jurist who served as Minister of Labour between 1918 and 1925 and leader of the Roman Catholic State Party between 1931 to 1936. He was granted the honorary title of Minister of State on 31 December 1934.

Aalberse became a member of the House of Representatives after the death of Herman Schaepman, serving from 24 February until 21 June 1916. Aalberse worked as a professor at the Delft Institute of Technology from 21 June 1916 until 25 September 1918. After the 1918 general election, Aalberse was appointed as the first Minister of Labour in the first Ruijs de Beerenbrouck cabinet, taking office on 25 September 1918. After the 1922 general election Aalberse continued as Minister of Labour in the second Ruijs de Beerenbrouck cabinet, taking office on 18 September 1922. On 1 January 1923, the Ministry of Labour and the Ministry of Agriculture, Commerce and Industry were combined to form the Ministry of Labour, Commerce and Industry, with Aalberse continuing in the post as the newly renamed Minister of Labour, Commerce and Industry. After the 1925 general election, Aalberse was not given a cabinet post in the new cabinet, the Cabinet Ruijs de Beerenbrouck II was replaced by the Cabinet Colijn I on 4 August 1925. Aalberse subsequently returned to the House of Representatives, taking office on 15 September 1925. After the death of Roman Catholic State Party leader Wiel Nolens, Aalberse was selected as his successor, taking office on 15 September 1931.

== Early life and education ==
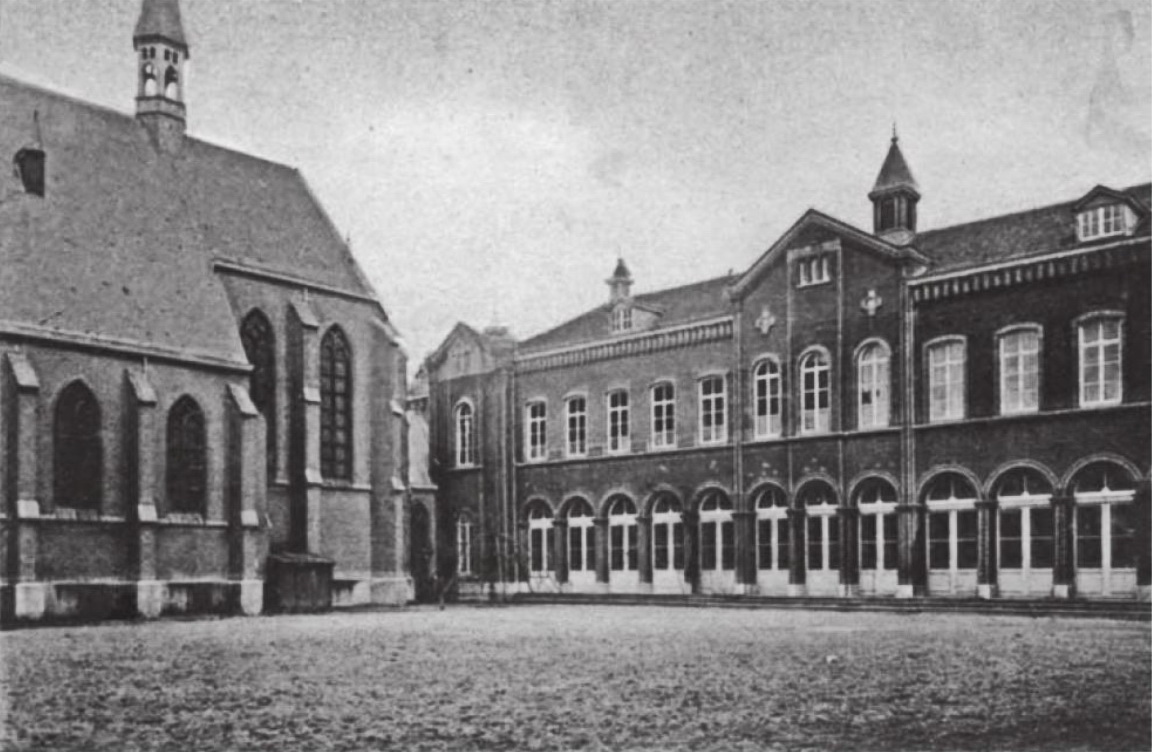
The Sint-Willibrorduscollege in Katwijk

He was born in Leiden to confectioner Bartholomeus Hendricus Johannes Aalberse and Johanna Kerkvliet. He attended a public elementary school and, from 1885 until 1891, attended gymnasium at the Sint-Willibrorduscollege in Katwijk. He started studying Dutch Language at Leiden University in 1891, but switched to Jurisprudence in 1893. At the university, he founded the Catholic student society Sanctus Augustinus along with Charles Ruijs de Beerenbrouck. During this time, he also started writing articles and columns for the Catholic newspapers De Tijd and De Maasbode. He received his doctorate on 18 November 1897 with a dissertation entitled Oneerlijke concurrentie en hare bestrijding volgens het Nederlandsche recht ("Unfair competition and measures to combat it under Dutch law").

After receiving his doctorate, Aalberse became a lawyer and attorney in Leiden, and legal adviser to the local chapter of the R.K. Volksbond, the mixed-class organisation of the Diocese of Haarlem. Two years later, in September 1899, he was elected to the municipal council of Leiden, and he was elected as the city's first alderman of Civil Registry, Social Affairs and Public Hygiene in September 1901, becoming the city's first Catholic alderman since the Reformation. During this period, Aalberse associated with several progressive circles. He was involved in the founding of the Central Bureau for Social Advice in 1899, and served for some time as a member of its board under the leadership of Willem Treub. He was also part of the Klarenbeek Club, which was frequented by progressive, interdenominationally-oriented Catholic intellectuals.

Aalberse contested the 1901 general election as a Catholic candidate in the districts of Enschede and Katwijk, but lost to the SDAP candidate Henri van Kol in the former, and to the Free Antirevolutionary candidate Otto Jacob Eifelanus van Wassenaer van Catwijck in the latter. The disappointment of these defeats led Aalberse to grow an aversion towards those Catholics who, within their political and social organisations, sought to bypass the Church leadership, and he began to align his reformist views more closely with various conservative groups amongst the country's highest clergy. This development brought his views more in line with those of Herman Schaepman, leader of the Catholics in parliament.

== National politics ==
=== First parliamentary tenure ===
Schaepman's death in January 1903 triggered a by-election in his district of Almelo. Aalberse contested the election, and won with 65% of the vote. He took office as a member of the House of Representatives on 24 February, and resigned from his municipal offices on 18 June of that year. In the House, Aalberse soon became an advocate of the Antithesis idea, and of a positive-Christian politics, and mainly concerned himself with policy regarding labour, trade and industry. He played an important role in the debates surrounding the 1909 Working Hours Act, where he tabled a motion seeking to limit the working day to ten hours, as well as the 1912 Bakers Act. In 1914, he introduced a private member's bill "to amend the Criminal Code by adding a new article to combat unfair competition", which was passed by a large majority in the House.

Aalberse was also active in social affairs outside parliament, becoming the intellectual leader of the "Leiden school", which advocated separate Catholic trade unions and class associations, as opposed to the interconfessional organisations advocated by the "Limburg school". Prompted by the railway strikes that began shortly after his election, Aalberse formed a Catholic action committee intended to counter the growing socialist influence amongst workers. In 1904, this committee gave rise to the Katholieke Sociale Actie (KSA). This organisation's ideas were propagated in the Katholiek Sociaal Weekblad, which Aalberse had established in 1902 and published writings of Catholic social leaders. He became secretary of the KSA's central committee in 1905, and was involved in the founding of the Catholic trade union, which materialised in 1909 as the R.K. Vakbureau. Even more so than Schaepman, Aalberse gradually found himself supported in numerous causes by a majority amongst the ecclesiastical elite.

Aalberse resigned from parliament on 20 June 1916 due to his appointment as Professor of Public Finance, Labour and Factory Legislation, Mining Law and Commercial Law at the Delft University of Technology. His inaugural lecture was entitled Economie en Techniek ("Economics and Technology"). In educating future engineers, he placed emphasis on ethical standards.

=== Ministership ===
On 26 September 1918, Aalberse was appointed as the Netherlands' first Minister of Labour (Labour, Trade and Industry from 1922) in the Ruijs de Beerenbrouck I cabinet. He accepted this post on the condition that he would be allowed to enact the reformist social legislation he was known to favour. His 1919 Labour Act prohibited the employment of children under the age of 14, introduced an eight-hour working day and a 45-hour working week for factory workers and office staff, and a maximum working day of ten hours for shop and hospitality staff. The act also stipulated that women were not permitted to work for eight weeks following childbirth. Other important legislation passed under Aalberse's ministership includes the Disability Act (1919), the Act Regulating Voluntary Old-Age Insurance (1919), the Act on State Supervision of Public Health (1919), the Agricultural Accidents Act (1922) and the Labour Disputes Act (1923).

Aside from legislation, Aalbserse established the High Council of Labour, a predecessor of the Social and Economic Council, which comprised representatives of workers, employers and agricultural and small business organisations, and adviced the government on matters relating to labour and social security. Furthermore, he established a National Housing Council, introduced child benefits for civil servants, and introduced a subsidy programme to stimulate private housing construction. In 1922, the Labour Act was amended to change the work day to eight and a half hours, and the work week to 48 hours.

=== Second parliamentary tenure and later career ===
After the 1925 general election, Aalberse returned to the House of Representatives. He was elected secretary of the Catholic parliamentary group, becoming the right hand of Wiel Nolens, leader of the Roman Catholic State Party. Outside parliament, he was appointed to the High Council of Labour, and later became its chairman. After Nolens' death in 1931, Aalberse succeeded him as party leader and chair of the parliamentary group. In this capacity, he at times strongly opposed the conservative–liberal policy of prime minister Hendrikus Colijn. This opposition became most apparent on in a debate on the government's economic policy on 23 July 1935, when he refused to support the government in a confidence vote. He subsequently attempted to form a new government, but this attempt failed. Colijn returned to power, leading a new government that included three Catholic minister, much to Aalberse's displeasure.

He was elected Speaker of the House of Representatives on 7 May 1936. Aalberse resigned from parliament on 9 November 1937 upon his appointment to the Council of State, on which he served until 1 April 1946.

== Private life ==
On 21 July 1898, Aalberse married Elisabeth Johanna Maria Schmier, with whom he had seven daughters and one son. He was member of the "Raad der Vereniging" of De Nederlandsche Padvinders from 1936 till 1947.

== Electoral history ==
House of Representatives, 1901–1918
Election	Electoral district	First round		Second round		Result
Election	Electoral district	Votes	%	Votes	%	Result
1901	Katwijk	2,347	42.6%	2,574	45.7%	Lost
1901	Enschede	4,256	43.2%	4,593	47.1%	Lost
1903	Almelo	3,821	64.7%	—		Won
1905	Almelo	5,217	66.5%	—		Won
1909	Almelo	4,744	67.8%	—		Won
1909	Amsterdam V	2,645	29.1%	2,994	33.3%	Lost
1909	Deventer	1806	30.6%	—		Lost
1913	Almelo	5,338	71.5%	—		Won

== Decorations ==
Honours
Ribbon bar	Honour	Country	Date	Comment
	Knight of the Order of the Netherlands Lion	Netherlands	24 February 1911	
	Commander of the Order of Orange-Nassau	Netherlands	31 August 1938	Elevated from Officer (31 August 1911)

Honorific titles
Ribbon bar	Honour	Country	Date	Comment
	Minister of State	Netherlands	31 December 1934	Style of Excellency

House of Representatives of the Netherlands
Preceded by Herman Schaepman	Member for Almelo; 1903–1916	Succeeded by Arnold Engels
Party political offices
Preceded by Wiel Nolens	Parliamentary leader of the Roman Catholic State Party in the House of Representatives; 1931–1936	Succeeded by Carel Goseling
Preceded by Wiel Nolens	Leader of the Roman Catholic State Party; 1931–1936	Succeeded by Carel Goseling
Political offices
New office	Minister of Labour; 1918–1923	Succeeded by Himself as Minister of Labour, Commerce and Industry
Preceded by Himself as Minister of Labour	Minister of Labour, Commerce and Industry; 1923–1925	Succeeded by Dionysius Koolen
Preceded by Charles Ruijs de Beerenbrouck as Minister of Agriculture, Commerce and Industry	Minister of Labour, Commerce and Industry; 1923–1925	Succeeded by Dionysius Koolen
Preceded by Charles Ruijs de Beerenbrouck	Speaker of the House of Representatives; 1936–1937	Succeeded by Josef van Schaik
