= Adrianus König =

Dutch politician

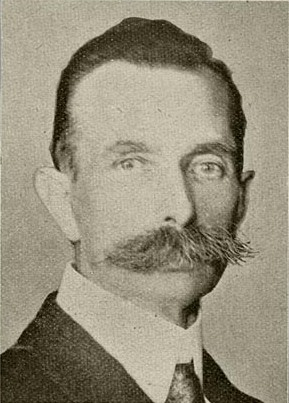
A.A.H.W. König

Adrianus Antonie Henri Willem König (13 February 1867, Maastricht – 6 February 1944, The Hague) was a Dutch politician. He served as Minister of Water Management from 1918 to 1922.
