= Willem Frederik Pop =

Dutch military officer (1936–1914)

Lieutenant general Willem Frederik Pop
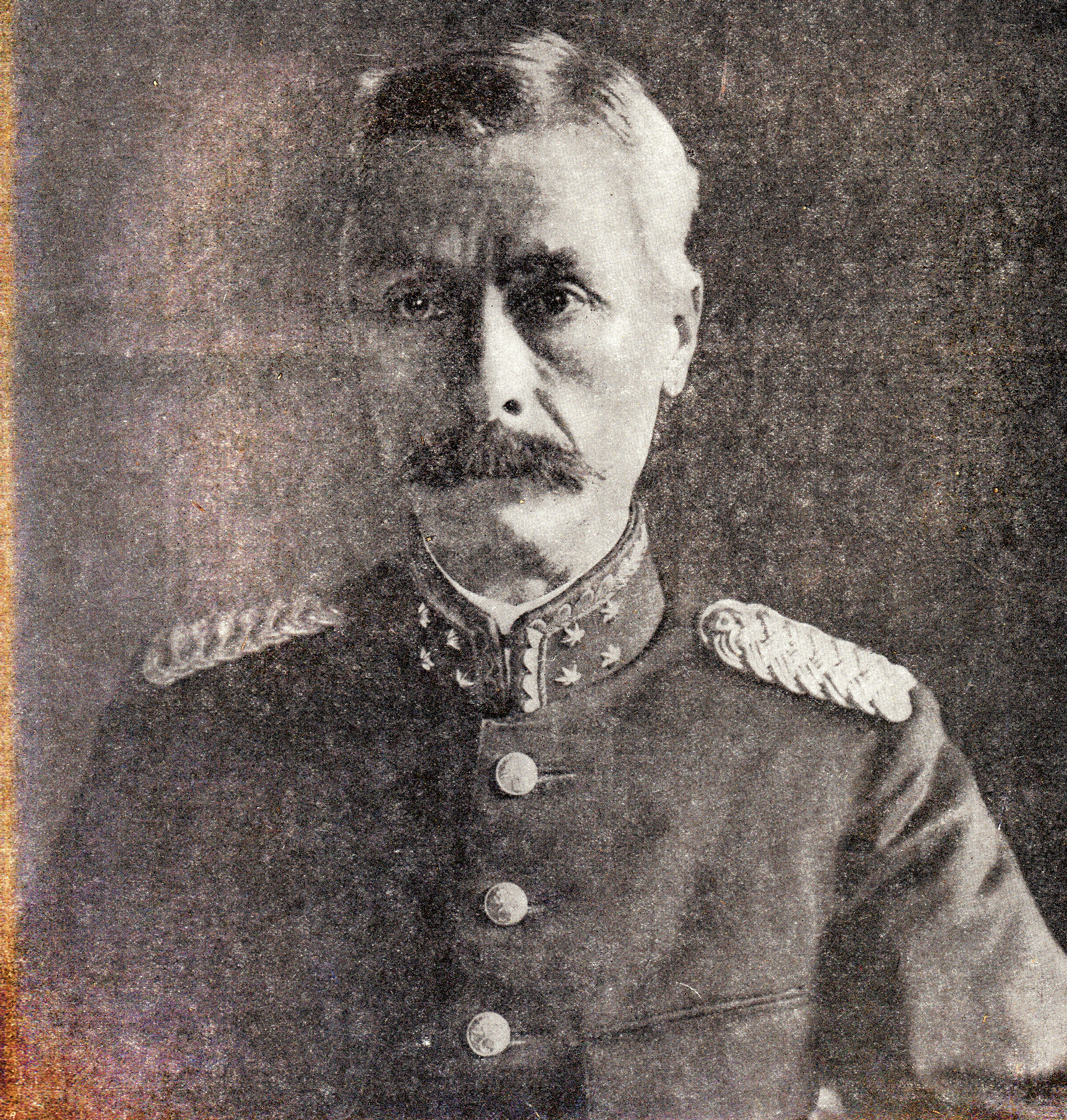

Chairman of the United Defence Staff of the Armed Forces of the Netherlands
- In office 9 November 1918 – 20 November 1919
- Preceded by: General Cornelis Snijders
- Succeeded by: Vacant (1919-1939); General Izaak Reijnders

Personal details
- Born: 14 June 1858 The Hague, Netherlands
- Died: 24 July 1931 (aged 73) Voorburg, Netherlands

Military service
- Allegiance: Netherlands
- Branch/service: Royal Netherlands Army
- Years of service: 1874-1921
- Rank: Lieutenant general

Lieutenant General Willem Frederik Pop (14 June 1858 – 24 July 1931) was a Dutch military officer who served as Commander-in-chief of the Armed Forces from November 1918 and November 1919.
