= Ministry of the Colonies (Netherlands) =

Former ministry of the Netherlands

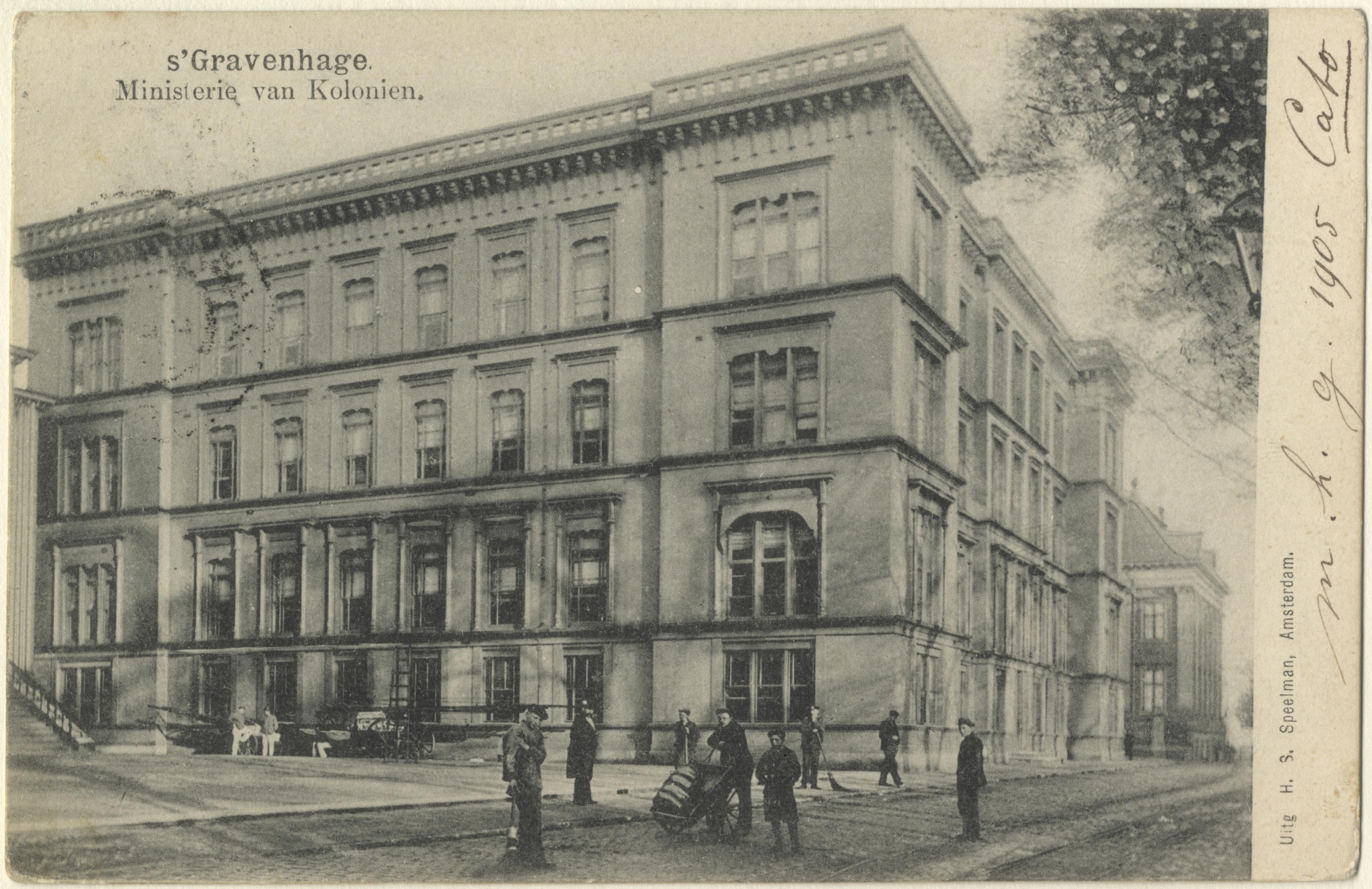
The Hague, Ministry of Colonies in 1904

The Ministry of Colonies (Dutch: Ministerie van Koloniën) was a Dutch ministry that arranged all matters relating to the Dutch colonies.

== History ==
After the dissolution of the West India Company, a Council of the American Colonies and Possessions was established, which in 1806 was rescinded under King Louis Napoleon Bonaparte. Instead, the Ministry of Commerce and Colonies was established on 29 July 1806, headed by Paulus van der Heim. This ministry was transformed on 8 July 1808 into the Ministry of Marine and Colonies, again under Van der Heim.

During the incorporation of the Netherlands at the First French Empire on 13 July 1810, the ministry continued as a separate division (Division Hollandaise) under the French Ministère de la Marine et des Colonies in Paris.

After the French were defeated in 1813, a Department for the Business of Commerce and Colonies was established on April 6, 1814, headed by Godert van der Capellen, as "Secretary of State". He was succeeded on 29 July 1814 by Joan Cornelis van der Hoop. Subsequently, on 16 September 1815, the title of "Secretary of State" was replaced by that of "Director-General", Johannes Goldberg was the first to wear this title. Until 1842 the Colonies, with the exception of the period between January 1, 1834 and August 9, 1840, was united with other departments: successively as:

- Commerce and Colonies (April 6, 1814 - March 18, 1818),
- Education, National Industry and Colonies (March 19, 1818). 29 March 1824),
- National Industry and Colonies (30 March 1824 - 4 April 1825),
- Navy and Colonies (5 April 1825 - 31 December 1829),
- Waterstaat, National Industry and Colonies (1 January 1830 - 30 September 1831),
- National Industry and Colonies (1 October 1831 - 31 December 1834),
- Colonies (independent ministry, 1 January 1834 - 9 August 1840),
- Navy and Colonies (10 August 1840 - 31 December 1841).

After 1 January 1842 Colonies became an independent ministry.

On 23 February 1945 the name was changed to the Ministry of Overseas Territories. In 1951 the name was changed to the Ministry for Union Affairs and Overseas Departments, followed by the Ministry of Overseas Territories in 1953. in 1957 the name was changed again, now in the Ministry of Overseas Affairs.

== From ministry to cabinet ==
Because of the decolonization, the ministry ceased to exist as an independent department in 1959. It became a separate "cabinet" (department), first under the Vice Prime Minister (1959-1971), later as:

- Cabinet for Surinamese and Dutch Antillean Affairs (1971-1975),
- Cabinet for Dutch Antillean Affairs (1975 - 1985, Suriname disappeared). after its independence in 1975) and
- Cabinet for Dutch Antillean and Aruban Affairs (1985-1998, Aruba obtained status as of 1 January 1986) among various ministers who joined the policy area next to their "head ministry".

In 1998, this government was included in the new Ministry of the Interior and Kingdom Relations.

== Colonial army ==
The ministry had its own armed forces. From 1816 the Dutch East Indies Army (from 1836 Royal Netherlands East Indies Army, KNIL) fell under the Ministry of Colonies. Also the Force in Suriname (TRIS) and its predecessors fell from 1868 to 1957 under the ministry or its successors. The KNIL was dissolved in Indonesia during the sovereignty transfer to Indonesia in July 1950. The TRIS, which from 1957 was part of the Royal Netherlands Army, was abolished after the transfer of sovereignty to Suriname in 1975.

== Housing ==
From 1829 the ministry was located in the Huygenshuis. In 1860 an own ministerial building was built in The Hague, the first ministerial building that was designed as such. During the Second World War, the ministry was based in London from 1940 to 1945. From 1959, the cabinet was located at Plein 1813.
