= Wiel Nolens =

Dutch politician

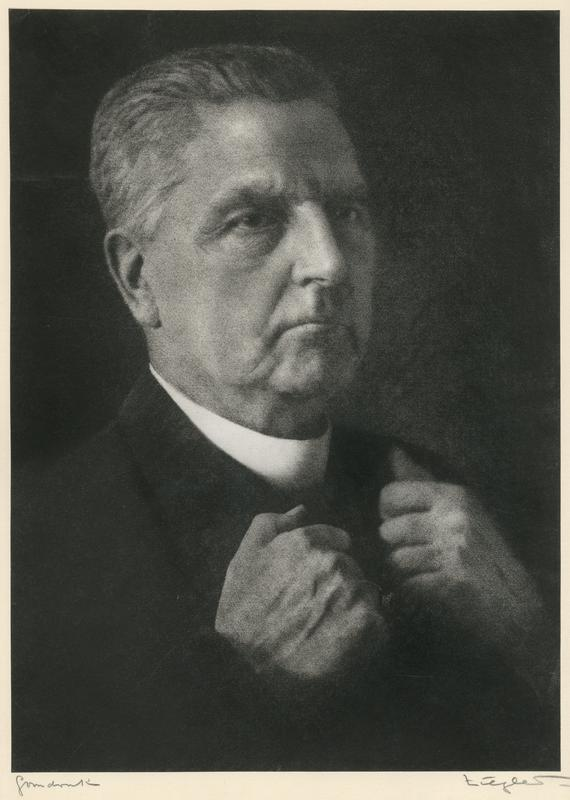
Willem Nolens (photo by Franz Ziegler)

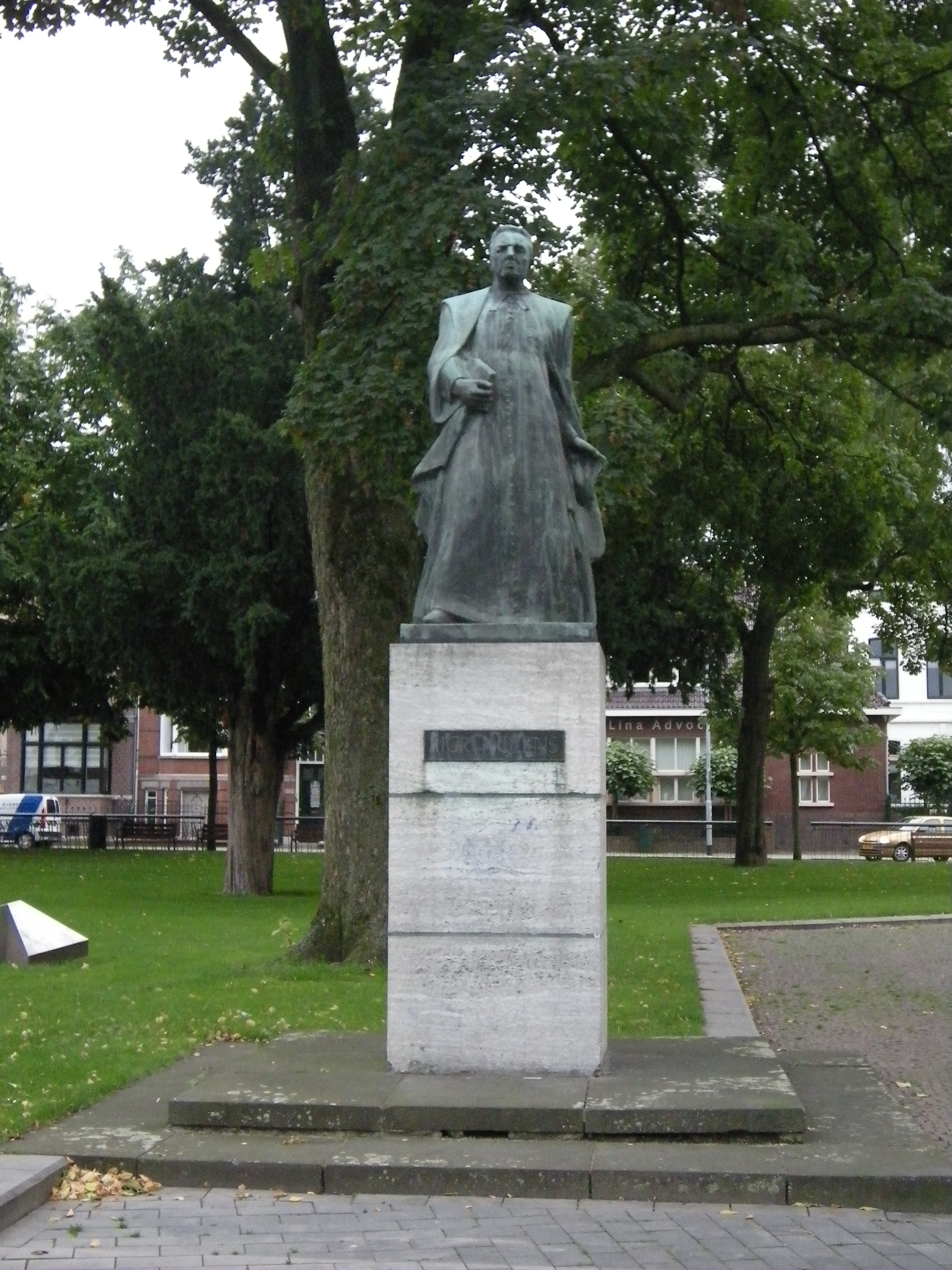
Statue of Willem Nolens in the Nolenspark

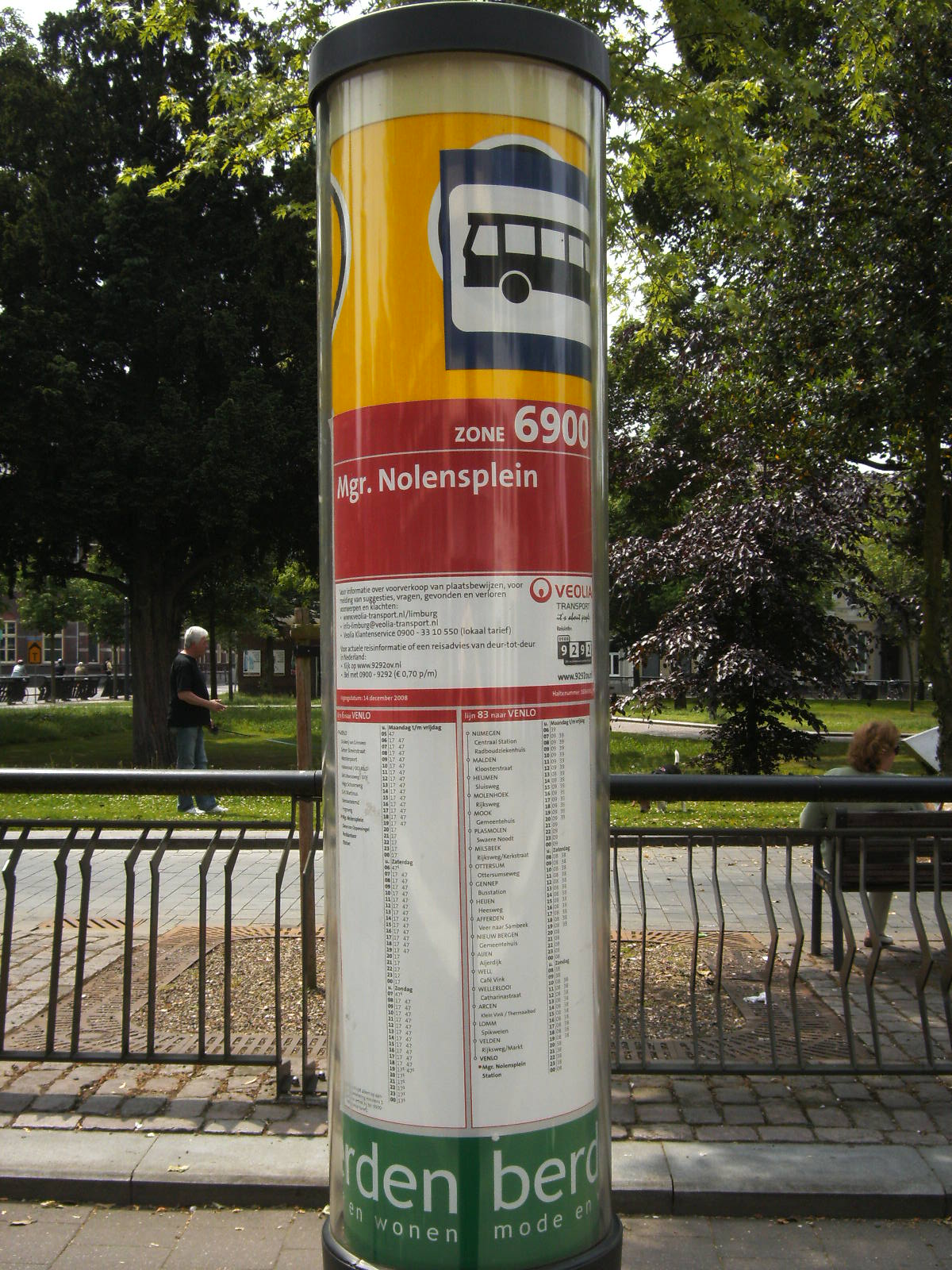
Bus stop Monseigneur Nolensplein in Venlo and Nolenspark behind

Wilhelmus Hubertus "Wiel" Nolens (Venlo, 7 September 1860 - The Hague, 27 August 1931) was a Dutch politician and a Roman Catholic priest.

== Life ==
Willem Hubert Nolens was born to Martin Nolens, a tanner, and Hermina Hubertina Linskens. He studied philosophy at the Bisschoppelijk College of Rolduc (1874–1880), theology at Roermond Seminary (1880–1884) and jurisprudence and law at Utrecht University (1887–1890). He was ordained a Roman Catholic priest in 1887 and taught economics and moral philosophy at Rolduc. In 1896 he was elected to the Dutch House of Representatives. He joined the club of Roman Catholic members of parliament of which fellow priest Herman Schaepman was the chairman.

== Politics ==
In 1904, a year after Schaepman's death, Nolens and other Roman Catholic politicians founded the General League of Roman Catholic Caucuses. He was a democratically minded politician who strove to better the fate of the working class and favoured better social security. Like Schaepman before him, this brought him into conflict with the conservative Catholics in parliament. In 1910 Nolens became the fractievoorzitter of the General League in parliament, a position he would retain until his death in 1931. In 1918 he became formateur of a cabinet. Although in Dutch political discourse becoming formateur normally leads to the office of Prime Minister, Nolens could not accept the position because of his clerical status. Instead Charles Ruijs de Beerenbrouck was named the first Roman Catholic prime minister in Dutch history and he chaired the cabinet Nolens had formed. In 1926 the loose organisation of the General League was further tightened and it was renamed to Roman Catholic State Party. When young Catholic intellectuals drifted towards right-wing extremism at the end of the 1920s Nolens faced increasing criticism. In 1930 the National Socialist Catholic poet Gerard Wijdeveld fiercely attacked Nolens in his poem De Droom van Nolens (Nolens' Dream) because of his perceived soft stance on freedom of religion in the Dutch East Indies.

== Importance ==
Nolens was an influential politician in Dutch politics throughout the 1920s and 1930s as the Roman Catholic State Party was the largest party in Dutch parliament at the time. He was immensely popular amongst the miners in his native Limburg for they owed much of their improved working and living conditions to his support for social reforms. The night before his funeral street lighting in Venlo was covered as a sign of mourning. Ten thousand people attended the funeral next day.

== See also ==
- Nolens Doctrine
