= Johan Braakensiek =

Dutch painter

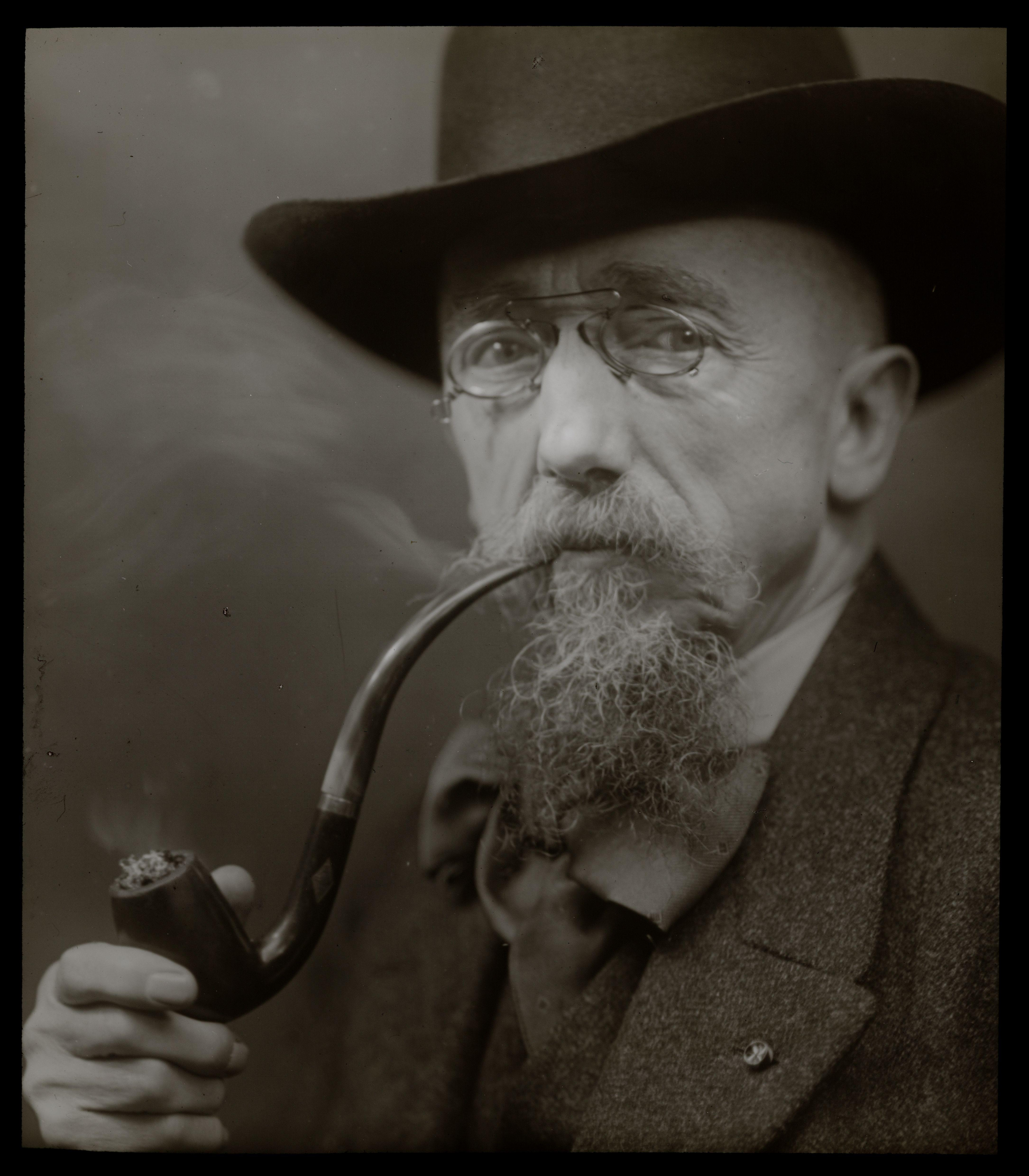
Johan Braakensiek

Johan Coenraad Braakensiek (24 May 1858 – 27 February 1940) was a Dutch painter, illustrator, caricaturist and political cartoonist. He is the grandfather of Jan van Oort.

== Personal life ==
Braakensiek was born in Amsterdam, the son of Albert Braakensiek, an illustrator and lithographer, and Wilhelmina Charlotta Elizabeth Anna Moolenizjer. He left school at age 11 and took a job in a fashion shop as a designer/embroider. He attended art classes by JB Tetar at the same time, at which his personal drawings were noticed by art critic Martin Klaff who recommended he take the entrance exam to the State Academy of Fine Arts, in Amsterdam from which he eventually graduated in 1881.

He was married on 23 September 1888 to Pietertje Kooijman. They had three daughters.

== Work ==
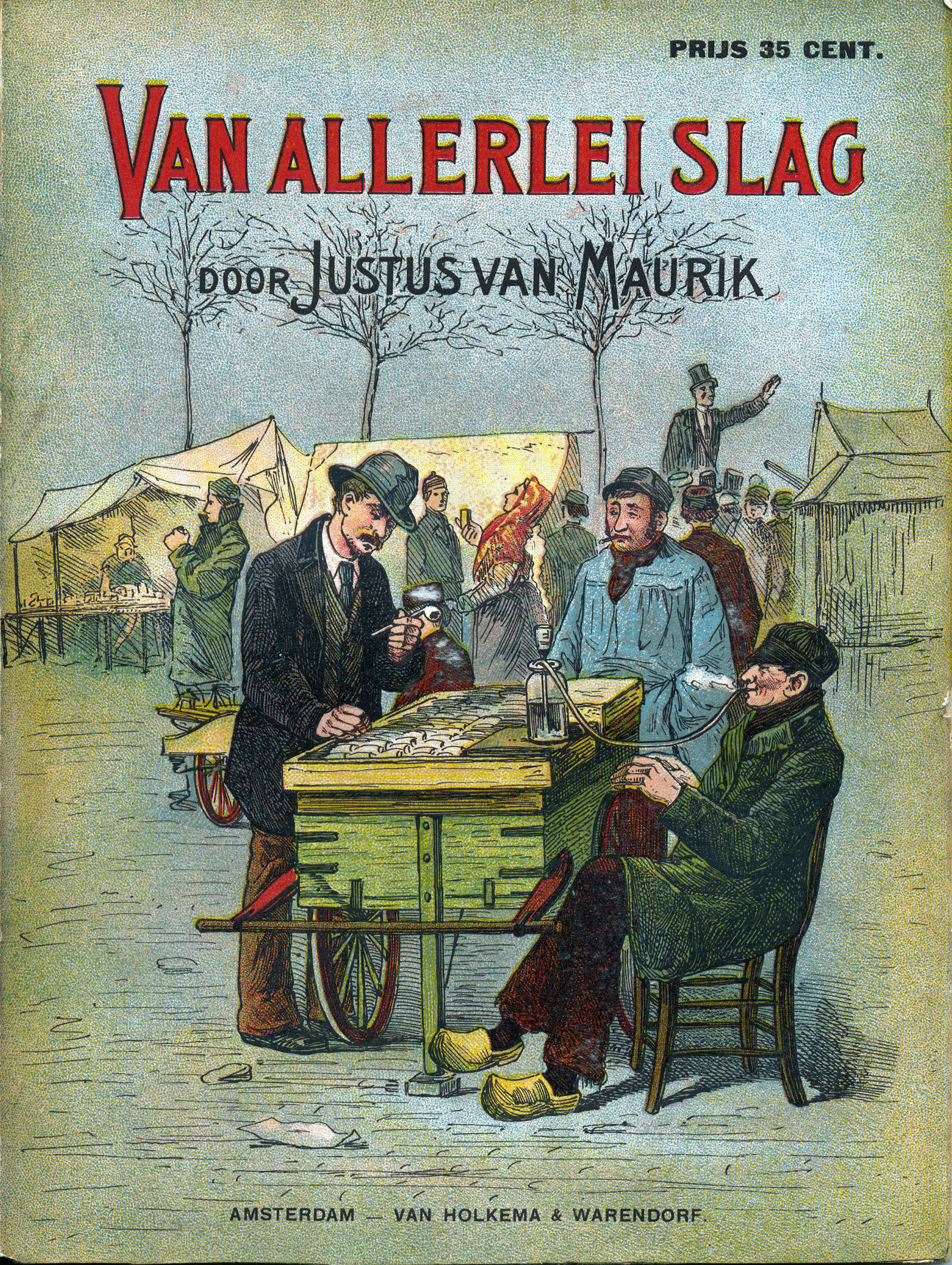
The cover of Justus van Maurik's Van Allerlei Slag, 1881, which was illustrated by Johan Braakensiek

For most of his career, Braakensiek worked for a number of publishers as an illustrator. However, he also found work as a political cartoonist for the magazines Geïllustreerd Politie-Nieuws, De Amsterdammer and De Groene Amsterdammer. His first work was with Geïllustreerd Politie-Nieuws where he contributed infrequently. His break and rise in popularity came in 1886 when he was made the political cartoonist for De Amsterdammer magazine. He also was affiliated with De Groene Amsterdammer magazine from 1925 to 1931. He is buried at Zorgvlied cemetery.

== Popularity ==
Braakensiek remains popular thanks to the books he worked on as illustrator. Books such as Van Allerlei Slag and Uit het leven van Dik Trom, which feature his art are widely known and read. His work is also featured in a number of text books in the Netherlands.
