= Charles Ruijs de Beerenbrouck =

Dutch politician (1873–1936)

His Excellency Jonkheer Charles Ruijs de Beerenbrouck
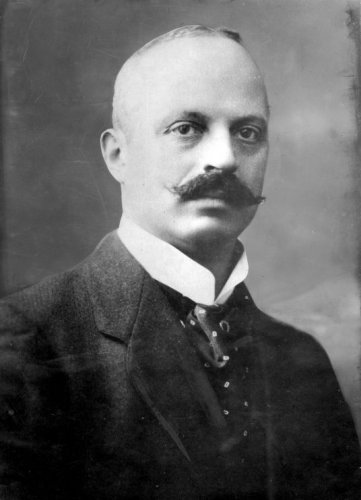
- Ruijs de Beerenbrouck

Chairman of the Council of Ministers
- In office 10 August 1929 – 26 May 1933
- Monarch: Wilhelmina
- Preceded by: Dirk Jan de Geer
- Succeeded by: Hendrikus Colijn
- In office 9 September 1918 – 4 August 1925
- Monarch: Wilhelmina
- Preceded by: Pieter Cort van der Linden
- Succeeded by: Hendrikus Colijn

Speaker of the House of Representatives
- In office 31 May 1933 – 17 April 1936
- Preceded by: Josef van Schaik
- Succeeded by: Piet Aalberse
- In office 17 September 1925 – 10 August 1929
- Preceded by: Dionysius Koolen
- Succeeded by: Josef van Schaik

Chairman of the Roman Catholic State Party
- In office 4 August 1925 – 10 August 1929
- Leader: Willem Hubert Nolens
- Preceded by: Antonius van Wijnbergen
- Succeeded by: Carel Goseling

Queen's Commissioner of Limburg
- In office 7 May 1918 – 9 September 1918
- Monarch: Wilhelmina
- Preceded by: Gustave Ruijs de Beerenbrouck
- Succeeded by: Eduard van Hövell tot Westerflier
Ministerial portfolios
Minister of Foreign Affairs
In office 20 April 1933 – 26 May 1933; Ad interim
Prime Minister	Charles Ruijs de Beerenbrouck
Preceded by	Frans Beelaerts van Blokland
Succeeded by	Andries Cornelis Dirk de Graeff
Minister of Agriculture, Commerce and Industry
In office 13 September 1922 – 1 January 1923; Ad interim
Prime Minister	Charles Ruijs de Beerenbrouck
Preceded by	Hendrik van IJsselsteyn
Succeeded by	Piet Aalberse as Minister of Labour, Commerce and Industry
Minister of the Interior and Agriculture
In office 10 August 1929 – 1 May 1932
Prime Minister	Charles Ruijs de Beerenbrouck
Preceded by	Jan Kan
Succeeded by	Himself as Minister of the Interior
In office 1 January 1923 – 4 August 1925
Prime Minister	Charles Ruijs de Beerenbrouck
Preceded by	Himself as Minister of the Interior
Succeeded by	Dirk Jan de Geer
Minister of War
In office 5 January 1920 – 31 March 1920; Ad interim
Prime Minister	Charles Ruijs de Beerenbrouck
Preceded by	George Alting von Geusau
Succeeded by	Willem Frederik Pop
Minister of Colonial Affairs
In office 13 August 1919 – 13 November 1919; Ad interim
Prime Minister	Charles Ruijs de Beerenbrouck
Preceded by	Alexander Idenburg
Succeeded by	Simon de Graaff
Minister of the Navy
In office 19 February 1919 – 19 April 1919; Ad interim
Prime Minister	Charles Ruijs de Beerenbrouck
Preceded by	Willem Naudin ten Cate
Succeeded by	Hendrik Bijleveld
Minister of the Interior
In office 1 May 1932 – 26 May 1933
Prime Minister	Charles Ruijs de Beerenbrouck
Preceded by	Himself as Minister of the Interior and Agriculture
Succeeded by	Jacob Adriaan de Wilde
In office 9 September 1918 – 1 January 1923
Prime Minister	Charles Ruijs de Beerenbrouck
Preceded by	Pieter Cort van der Linden
Succeeded by	Himself as Minister of the Interior and Agriculture
Parliamentary offices
Member of the House of Representatives
In office 9 May 1933 – 17 April 1936
In office 15 September 1925 – 10 August 1929
In office 25 July 1922 – 18 September 1922
In office 7 December 1909 – 16 May 1918
Constituency	Gulpen
In office 19 September 1905 – 21 September 1909
Constituency	Gulpen

Personal details
- Born: Charles Joseph Marie Ruijs de Beerenbrouck; 1 December 1873 Roermond, Netherlands
- Died: 17 April 1936 (aged 62) Utrecht, Netherlands
- Party: Roman Catholic State Party (from 1926)
- Other political affiliations: General League (until 1926)
- Spouse: Maria van der Heyden (m. 1902)
- Children: 3
- Parent: Gustave Ruijs de Beerenbrouck (1842–1926) (father)
- Relatives: Godfried van Voorst tot Voorst (son in law)
- Education: Utrecht University (LLB); Leiden University (LLM)
- Occupation: Politician · Civil servant · Jurist · Lawyer · Prosecutor

Charles Joseph Marie Ruijs de Beerenbrouck (1 December 1873 – 17 April 1936) was a Dutch politician of the Roman Catholic State Party (RKSP). He served as Chairman of the Council of Ministers from 9 September 1918 until 4 August 1925 and from 10 August 1929 until 26 May 1933.

== Early life ==
Charles Joseph Maria Ruijs de Beerenbrouck was born on 1 December 1873 in Roermond, a town with a Bishop's see in the province of Limburg, in the very south of the Netherlands. Born into an aristocratic family, he grew up in a predominantly Catholic community and went to school in Maastricht and in The Hague. He attended the Utrecht University and in 1895, he obtained his master's degree in law at the Leiden University.

He was the son of Gustave Ruijs de Beerenbrouck (1842–1926), Minister of Justice in the Mackay cabinet (founder of the labour and social laws first) and later governor of Limburg (1918).

== Career ==
He started his career in 1896 as a lawyer in Maastricht. In 1899 Ruijs de Beerenbrouck became a member of the Maastricht municipal council and in 1905 he was elected to the House of Representatives. Ruijs de Beerenbrouck remained a councillor and a member of parliament until 16 May 1918, when he became Queen's Commissioner of the province of Limburg (in the province of Limburg usually called Gouverneur, or Governor).

Ruijs de Beerenbrouck did not stay in office as Queen's Commissioner for long, as on 9 September 1918 he was appointed as minister of the Interior and "temporary" Chairman of the Council of Ministers.

As Chairman of the Council of Ministers he had to deal with the aftermath of World War I. Although the Netherlands had remained neutral during the conflict, Ruijs de Beerenbrouck nevertheless faced several problems, particularly the return of German troops through the province of Limburg and the exile of the German emperor Wilhelm II.

In November 1918 the leader of the Social Democratic Workers' Party (SDAP), Pieter Jelles Troelstra, inspired by the Russian Revolution and the German Revolution of 1918–1919, called for a socialist revolution among the working class. However, the revolution attempt of Troelstra met with little enthusiasm. Despite this, the Ruijs de Beerenbrouck cabinet enacted several social reforms in order to satisfy the working class.

The Labour Act of November 1919, for example, introduced an eight-hour day, limited night work and provided for (as noted by one study) “establishment of a department of labor inspection.” Laws were passed in 1919 and 1921 that extended workmen's compensation to additional groups, while in 1919 an Invalidity Act was passed which provided (as noted by one study) “life pensions for widows and pensions for orphans to their majority.” That same year, a Health Act was passed which set up a separate inspectorate for child health. The Old Age Pensions Act of November 1919 established voluntary old age insurance for self-employed persons, while the Pensions Act of May 1922 provided pensions for public servants, together with their widows and orphans.

In 1919, a High Council of Labour was set up that advised on issues related to workers and social security. The Unemployment Insurance Emergency Act of 1919 provided temporary support to municipal unemployment funds, while the Meat Inspection Act of 1919 sought to prevent the sale of meat and meat products that posed a risk to public health. In 1920, the coverage of family allowances was extended to the entire civil service, while a subsidy scheme was set up that same year to encourage the homebuilding by private individuals and institutions.

From 1925 to 1929 Ruijs de Beerenbrouck was Speaker of the House of Representatives.

During his third cabinet Ruijs de Beerenbrouck had to deal with the worldwide Great Depression of 1929 and the early 1930s, which had crippling effects on the Dutch economy, effects which lasted longer than they did in most European countries. The depression led to high unemployment and poverty, as well as increasing social unrest. Ruijs de Beerenbrouck was forced to cut government expenses and to devalue the national currency, the Guilder, but these measures only worsened the effects of the economic crisis.

In February 1933 the third Ruijs de Beerenbrouck cabinet ordered the bombing of the navy cruiser De Zeven Provinciën, when sailors aboard the cruiser, cruising near Sumatra, mutinied because of the cutting of their wages. Twenty three mutineers were killed, resulting in a prolonged controversy and recriminations.

In 1933 Ruijs de Beerenbrouck became Speaker of the House of Representatives again. He remained in office until his death.

== Personal life ==
On 15 April 1902, Ruijs de Beerenbrouck married Maria van der Heyden (19 August 1877 – 17 January 1948). Ruijs de Beerenbrouck died on 17 April 1936 at the age of 62 in Utrecht.

== Decorations ==
Honours
Ribbon bar	Honour	Country	Date	Comment
	Grand Officer of the Order of the House of Orange	Netherlands	1 December 1918	
	Grand Cross of the Order of the Crown	Belgium	5 July 1922	
	Knight Grand Cross of the Order of Orange-Nassau	Netherlands	4 August 1925	Elevated from Grand Officer (31 August 1923)
	Grand Cordon of the Order of Leopold	Belgium	25 August 1925	
	Knight Grand Cross of the Order of the Netherlands Lion	Netherlands	25 July 1927	Elevated from Commander (1 August 1924)
	Knight of the Order of the Holy Sepulchre	Holy See	10 December 1929	

Honorific Titles
Ribbon bar	Honour	Country	Date	Comment
	Minister of State	Netherlands	25 July 1927	Style of Excellency

House of Representatives of the Netherlands
Preceded by Joseph Merckelbach	Member for Gulpen; 1905–1918	Succeeded by Henri Hermans
Party political offices
Preceded by Antonius van Wijnbergen	Chairman of the Roman Catholic State Party; 1925–1929	Succeeded by Carel Goseling
Political offices
Preceded by Gustave Ruijs de Beerenbrouck	Queen's Commissioner of Limburg; 1918	Succeeded by Eduard van Hövell tot Westerflier
Preceded by Pieter Cort van der Linden	Chairman of the Council of Ministers; 1918–1925	Succeeded by Hendrikus Colijn
Preceded by Pieter Cort van der Linden	Minister of the Interior; 1918–1923	Succeeded by Himself as Minister of the Interior and Agriculture
Preceded by Willem Naudin ten Cate	Minister of the Navy; Ad interim 1919	Succeeded by Hendrik Bijleveld
Preceded by Alexander Idenburg	Minister of Colonial Affairs; Ad interim 1919	Succeeded by Simon de Graaff
Preceded by George Alting von Geusau	Minister of War; Ad interim 1920	Succeeded by Willem Frederik Pop
Preceded by Hendrik van IJsselsteyn	Minister of Agriculture, Commerce and Industry; Ad interim 1922–1923	Succeeded by Piet Aalberse as Minister of Labour, Commerce and Industry
Preceded by Hendrik van IJsselsteyn	Minister of Agriculture, Commerce and Industry; Ad interim 1922–1923	Succeeded by Himself as Minister of the Interior and Agriculture
Preceded by Himself as Minister of the Interior	Minister of the Interior and Agriculture; 1923–1925	Succeeded by Dirk Jan de Geer
Preceded by Dionysius Koolen	Speaker of the House of Representatives; 1925–1929	Succeeded by Josef van Schaik
Preceded by Dirk Jan de Geer	Chairman of the Council of Ministers; 1929–1933	Succeeded by Hendrikus Colijn
Preceded by Jan Kan	Minister of the Interior and Agriculture; 1929–1932	Succeeded by Himself as Minister of the Interior
Preceded by Himself as Minister of the Interior and Agriculture	Minister of the Interior; 1932–1933	Succeeded by Jacob Adriaan de Wilde
Preceded by Frans Beelaerts van Blokland	Minister of Foreign Affairs; Ad interim 1933	Succeeded by Andries Cornelis; Dirk de Graeff
Preceded by Josef van Schaik	Speaker of the House of Representatives; 1933–1936	Succeeded by Piet Aalberse
