= Alexey Diakonoff =

Russian-Dutch entomologist (1907–1989)

- Born: 1 March 1907; Saint Petersburg
- Died: 20 September 1989; Leiden
- Education: University of Amsterdam
- Awards: Officer of the Order of Orange-Nassau
- Scientific career
- Fields: Lepidopterology
- Workplaces: Bogor Zoology Museum; Rijksmuseum van Natuurlijke Historie

Alexey Nikolaievich Diakonoff (1 March 1907 – 20 September 1989), also transliterated as Alexej Nikolajewitsch Diakonoff, was a Russian–Dutch entomologist who specialised in Microlepidoptera.

His parents immigrated to the Dutch East Indies where, from 1923, he had his elementary education. Diakonoff then studied biology at the University of Amsterdam. A thesis on Indo-Malayan Tortricidae completed, he returned to Java in 1939 to take up a post as an entomologist at a sugar plantations and industries research station. In 1941, he was offered a position at the Bogor Zoology Museum at Bogor Botanical Gardens but the Japanese invasion intervened. In 1945 he returned to the Netherlands and studied at Leiden Museum, working in the Lepidoptera collection. He returned to Bogor as the Dutch tried to regain Java. This failed and in 1951 Diakonoff left Java for the last time. He became Curator of Lepidoptera at the Rijksmuseum van Natuurlijke Historie in Leiden. He was an active member of the Netherlands Entomological Society and a long-time editor of Tijdschrift voor Entomologie. His scientific work in the Leiden museum continued until his death and his collection is conserved in Naturalis.

== Works ==
Partial list as Diakonoff, A.N.

- 1937 – De risjmot, Corcyra cephalonica St. (Lep., Galleriidae) een in Nederlandsch-Indie en in Nederland nog weinig bekende vijand van tropische en andere producten. - Berichten van de Afdeeling Handlesmuseum von de Kon.Vereeninging Kolonial Institut, Amsterdam No. 112, 22p.
- *1939 – On some Indian Tortricidae (Lepidoptera). Records of the Indian Museum. Vol.41 (03): 231-233.
- 1947 – Notes on Tortricidae from the Malay Archipelago with description of a new species (Lep.). Tijdschr. Ent. 88: 340-344,
- 1948 – Fauna Buruana. Microlepidoptera II - Treubia 19: 197-249. Figs.
- 1948 – Microlepidoptera from Madagascar. Mém. Inst. sci. Madag. (A) 1: 22-30, figs. 1-8
- 1950a. A revision of the family Ceracidae (Lepidoptera Tortricoidea). Bulletin of the British Museum (Natural History). Entomology 1: 173–219. Available online. DOI: 10.5962/bhl.part.27229
- 1950b – The Type Specimens of certain Oriental Eucosmidae and Carposinidae (Microlepidoptera). - Bull. Br. Mus. nat. Hist. (Ent.): 273-300.
- 1951 – Entomological results from the Swedish Expedition 1934 to Burma and British India. Lepidoptera, Collected by René Malaise, Microlepidoptera I. With 1 map and 35 figures in the text. - Arkiv för Zoologi Band 3 nr. 6, Almqvist & Wiksell Boktryckeri, Uppsala. 59 - 94 pp.
- 1954 – Records and Descriptions of Microlepidoptera (7). Zool.Verhandlingen 22:1-58.
- 1955 – Microlepidoptera of New Guinea. Results of the third Archbold Expedition (American- Netherlands Indian Expedition 1938-1939). Part V. Verhandelingen der Koninklijke Nederlandse Akademie van Wetenschappen, Afdeling Natuurkunde (2) 50(3):1–210.
- 1955 – Microlepidoptera of New Guinea. Part 5. - Veh.Kon.Ned.Adad.Wet., Nat.ser.2, 50(3):1-211, figs.720-861.
- 1957a – Tortricidae from Reunion (Microlepidoptera).- Mém.ins.scient.Madagascar, (E) 8: 237-283
- 1957b – Remarks on Cryptophlebia Walsingham and related genera (Lepidoptera, Tortricidae, Olethreutinae).- Tijdschr.Ent.,100: 129-146.
- 1958a – Zeller's types of African Tortricidae and Glyphipterygidae in the Stockholm Museum. — Entomologisk Tidskrift 78 (1957)(): 69–80.
- 1958b – Notes on Saalmüller's types of Malagassy Microlepidoptera.- Senckenberg.biol.,39:89-90.
- 1959a. Revision of Cryptaspasma Walsingham, 1900 (Lepidoptera, Tortricidae). — Zoölogische Verhandelingen, Leiden 43(): 1–60, pls. 1–13.
- 1959b – Mabille's types of Malagassy Tortricidae (Lepidoptera).- Revue fr.Ent.,26:167-186.
- 1959c – Meyricks's types of tortricidae from Madagascar in the Vienna Museum.- Ann.naturh.Mus.Wien, 63: 409-413
- 1960 – Tortricidae from Madagascar. Part I Tortricinae and Chlidanotinae. Verhandligen koninklijke Nederlandse Akademie van Wetetenshappen. Afd., Natuurkunde, 53(1), 209 pp, 40 pls.
- 1961 – Tortricidae from Madagascar in the Berlin Museum. D. ent. Z., new ser. 8: 152-155, figs. 1-2
- 1963c – Tortricidae (Lepid.) collected in Madagascar by Dr. Fred Keiser. Verh. naturf. Ges. Basel 74: 133-144, figs. 1-5, t. 1-3
- 1963d – African species of the genus Bactra Stephens (Lep., Tortricidae). Tijdschr. ent. 106: 285-357, figs. 1-73
- 1967 – Microlepidoptera of the Philippines Washington, Smithsonian Institution Press
- 1968a – Descriptions of three new genera of Olethreutinae (Lepidoptera, Tortricidae). — Beaufortia 15(): 69–77.
- 1968c. Microlepidoptera of the Philippine Islands. - Bulletin of the United States National Museum 257:1–484.
- 1969 – Tortricidae from Seychelles and Aldabra (Lepidoptera). Tijdschrift voor Entomologie112(3): 81-100, pls 1-13.
- 1970a – Lepidoptera Tortricoidea from Tsaratanana Range, Mém.Orstom No. 37: 103-150
- 1970b – A new Tortricid from the Seychelles Islands. — Annales de la Société Entomologique de France (N.S.) 6(): 995–998
- 1974 – Exotic Tortricoidea, with descriptions of new species (Lepidoptera). - Annales de la Société Entomologique de France |series=New Series 10(1):219–227
- 1976 – Tortricoidea from Nepal, 2. — Zoölogische Verhandelingen, Leiden 144(): 1–145, 14 plates.
- 1976 – Aantekeningen over de Nederlandse Microlepidoptera 3 (Glyphipterigidae). Entomologische Berichten, 36: 82-84.
- 1977 – Tortricidae and Choreutidae from Reunion (Lepidoptera) - Ann. Soc. Entomol. Fr. (N.S.) 13 (1): 101-116
- 1978 – Descriptions of new Genera and species of the so-called Glyphipterygidae Sensu Meyrick, 1913 (Lepidoptera) Zool. Verh. Leiden 160 (1) : 1-63.
- 1978 – Revival of an old species with two new synonyms and description of two new species of Palaearctic Choreutidae (Lepidoptera). - Zool.Med., 53:199-2017. figs.1-9.
- 1981 – Tortricidae from Madagascar, Part2. Olethreutinae, 1.- Ann. Soc. Entomol. Fr.(N.S.)17(1): 7-32
- 1983b – Tortricidae from Madagascar Part 2. Olethreutinae, 2 (Lepidoptera). — Annales de la Société Entomologique de France (N.S.) 19(): 291–310
- 1983d – A new species of Stathmopoda Herrich-Schäffer from the Seychelles Islands (Lepdioptera: Stathmopodidae). - Entomologische Berichten, Amsterdam 43(8):117–118.
- 1986 – Two new Grapholitini from Malta and Madeira (Lepidoptera, Tortricidae). — Nota Lepidopterologica 9 (3-4): 170-174.
- 1986 – Microlepidoptera Palaearctica: Glyphiterigidae auct. sensu lato Microlep. Palaearctica 7.
- 1987. Descriptions and a record of Tortricidae: Grapholitini (Lepidoptera) from Madagascar. - Tinea 12(Suppl.):118–144.
- 1988a- Tortricidae from Madagascar, Part2. Olethreutinae, 3 (Lepidoptera).- Ann. Soc. Entomol. Fr.(N.S.)24(2): 161-180
- 1988b- Tortricidae from Madagascar, Part2. Olethreutinae, 4 (Lepidoptera).- Ann. Soc. Entomol. Fr. (N.S.)24(3): 307-330
- 1989a- Tortricidae from Madagascar, Part2. Olethreutinae, 5 (Lepidoptera).- Ann. Soc. Entomol. Fr. (N.S.)25(1): 41-69
- 1989b- Tortricidae from Madagascar, Part2. Olethreutinae, 6 (Lepidoptera).-Ann. Soc. Entomol. Fr.(N.S.)25(4): 431-460
- 1989 – Revision of the Palaearctic Carposinidae with description of a new genus and new species (Lepidoptera: Pyraloidea). Zoölogische Verhandelingen. 251: 1–155.
- 1992 – Tortricidae from Madagascar, Part2. Olethreutinae, 7 (Lepidoptera).- Ann. Soc. Entomol. Fr. (N.S.)28(1): 37-71
- c. 250 scientific papers describing very many hundreds of species and genera of Microlepidoptera, in particular from the Indonesian archipelago.

== See also ==
- Category:Taxa named by Alexey Diakonoff
