= Anna Maria van Erp Taalman Kip =

Dutch classical scholar (1935–2016)

- Born: Anna Maria van Erp Taalman Kip; 13 September 1935; Arnhem, Netherlands
- Died: 21 November 2016 (aged 81); Amsterdam, Netherlands
- Occupation: Professor of Ancient Greek

Academic background
- Education: University of Amsterdam
- Thesis: Agamemnon in epos en tragedie: de persoonsuitbeelding als component van het epische en dramatische werk (1971)
- Doctoral advisor: Jan Coenraad Kamerbeek

Academic work
- Discipline: Classics
- Sub-discipline: Ancient Greek literature
- Institutions: University of Amsterdam

Anna Maria van Erp Taalman Kip (13 September 1935 – 21 November 2016) was a Dutch classical scholar, known for her work on Greek tragedy.

== Biography ==
Van Erp Taalman Kip was born in Arnhem on 21 November 1935. She studied at the University of Amsterdam, passing her doctoraal examination in 1961. She then taught at the Montessori Lyceum Amsterdam and the Stedelijk Gymnasium Haarlem. She obtained her doctorate at the University of Amsterdam in 1971, with a thesis on the portrayal of Agamemnon in Greek epic and tragedy, written under the supervision of Jan Coenraad Kamerbeek.

She was then appointed as a research fellow at the University of Amsterdam. She served as Professor of Greek from 1996 to 2000, in succession to Jan Maarten Bremer.

She died in Amsterdam on 21 November 2016.

== Selected publications ==
=== Monographs ===
- van Erp Taalman Kip, A. M. (1971). Agamemnon in epos en tragedie. De persoonsuitbeelding als component van het epische en dramatische werk. Van Gorcum. ISBN 9789023208839.
- van Erp Taalman Kip, A. M. (1990). Reader and Spectator: Problems in the Interpretation of Greek Tragedy. J.C. Gieben. ISBN 9789050630559.

=== Editions of ancient texts ===
- Bremer, Jan Maarten; van Erp Taalman Kip, A. M.; Slings, S. (1987). Some Recently Found Greek Poems. Brill. ISBN 9789004083196.
