= Jan Coenraad Kamerbeek =

Dutch classical scholar (1907–1998)

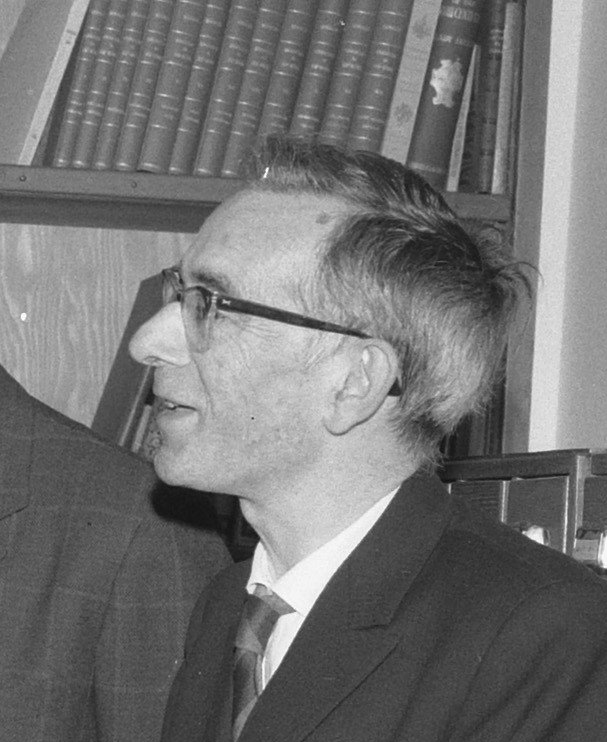
- Kamerbeek in 1962
- Born: Jan Coenraad Kamerbeek; 4 October 1907; Rotterdam, Netherlands
- Died: 13 March 1998 (aged 90); Haarlem, Netherlands
- Occupation: Professor of Ancient Greek

Academic background
- Education: Utrecht University
- Thesis: Studiën over Sophocles (1934)
- Doctoral advisor: Carl Wilhelm Vollgraff

Academic work
- Discipline: Classics
- Sub-discipline: Ancient Greek literature
- Institutions: University of Amsterdam
- Doctoral students: Jan Maarten Bremer; Anna Maria van Erp Taalman Kip; Stefan Radt

Jan Coenraad Kamerbeek (4 October 1907 – 13 March 1998) was a Dutch classical scholar, known for his work on the ancient Greek tragic playwright Sophocles.

== Biography ==
Kamerbeek was born in Rotterdam on 4 October 1907. He was the son of the geography and history teacher Jan Kamerbeek, and the younger brother of Jan Kamerbeek Jr., who became a well-known literary scholar.

Kamerbeek was educated at the Gymnasium Erasmianum in Rotterdam from 1919 to 1925, where he was taught by classical scholar J. H. Leopold. Kamerbeek then studied at Utrecht University, passing his doctoraal examination in 1930. In 1934, he obtained his doctorate at Utrecht University, with a thesis on Sophocles written under the supervision of Carl Wilhelm Vollgraff.

From 1931 to 1951, Kamerbeek worked as a teacher at the Murmellius Gymnasium in Alkmaar. In 1940, following the German invasion of the Netherlands, the headmaster Jacob Hemelrijk, who was Jewish, was forced to resign by the Germans. Kamerbeek was appointed by the school board as acting headmaster. Many years later, Kamerbeek explained that he hoped to maintain the school and the standard of teaching that Hemelrijk had established, in order to restore it to Hemelrijk if he ever returned. This in fact happened, since Hemelrijk survived his captivity at Buchenwald, and resumed his position as headmaster in 1945.

In 1951, Kamerbeek was appointed to the Chair of Ancient Greek at the University of Amsterdam, in succession to W. E. J. Kuiper. In 1953, he published the first volume of his commentary on the seven surviving tragedies of Sophocles, which occupied much of his effort throughout the rest of his career. In 1959, he was appointed as a member of the Royal Netherlands Academy of Arts and Sciences. In 1975, he was made a Knight of the Order of the Netherlands Lion.

Kamerbeek's doctoral students at Amsterdam included Jan Maarten Bremer and Anna Maria van Erp Taalman Kip, who each held the Chair of Ancient Greek in succession after Kamerbeek's retirement, as well as Stefan Radt and Cornelis Jord Ruijgh.

Kamerbeek's retirement in 1976 was marked by the publication of a Festschrift volume, Miscellanea tragica in honorem J. C. Kamerbeek. In 1978, he was awarded an honorary doctorate by the Vrije Universiteit Brussel. In retirement, he continued to work on his commentary on Sophocles' plays, publishing the seventh and final volume on Oedipus at Colonus in 1984.

He died on 13 March 1998 in Haarlem. In 2003, a conference on "Sophocles and the Greek Language" was held at the University of Amsterdam to commemorate the fiftieth anniversary of the publication of the first volume of Kamerbeek's Sophocles commentary. This conference led to the publication of a volume of essays on the same topic in 2006.

== Selected publications ==
=== Dissertation ===
- Kamerbeek, J. C. (1934). Studiën over Sophocles.

=== Commentaries on ancient texts ===
- Kamerbeek, J. C. (1953–1984). The Plays of Sophocles. Brill. Seven volumes. ISBN 9789004011984; ISBN 9789004011991; ISBN 9789004057371; ISBN 9789004012004; ISBN 9789004038363; ISBN 9789004061484; ISBN 9789004070349.
