= Irene de Jong =

Dutch classicist (born 1957)

Irene de Jong FBA
- Born: 9 June 1957 (age 69); Leiden, Netherlands

Academic background
- Education: University of Amsterdam
- Thesis: Narrators and focalizers: the presentation of the story in the Iliad (1987)
- Doctoral advisors: Mieke Bal and Jan Maarten Bremer

Academic work
- Discipline: Classics
- Sub-discipline: Ancient Greek literature
- Institutions: University of Amsterdam

Irene Jacqueline Frederike de Jong FBA (born 9 June 1957) is a Dutch classical scholar, known for her pioneering work on narratology and Ancient Greek literature.

== Career ==
Irene Jacqueline Frederike de Jong was born in Leiden on 9 June 1957. She studied at the University of Amsterdam from 1978 until 1982, and taught Classics at the Stedelijk Gymnasium in Utrecht in 1982–83. In 1984 she worked as a research fellow at the Thesaurus Linguae Graecae at the University of Hamburg. She wrote her dissertation, Narrators and focalizers: the presentation of the story in the Iliad, at the University of Amsterdam, funded by a grant from the Netherlands Organisation for Scientific Research (NWO) from 1985 until 1987, under the supervision of Jan Maarten Bremer and Mieke Bal. She then continued to work at the University of Amsterdam, first as a postdoc and later as a research fellow.

From 2002, De Jong held the chair of Ancient Greek at the University of Amsterdam. Her retirement was marked by the publication of a volume of essays in 2022, titled Emotions and Narrative in Ancient Literature and Beyond: Studies in Honour of Irene de Jong.

De Jong has been member of the Academia Europaea since 2007. In 2015, De Jong was also selected as member of the Royal Netherlands Academy of Arts and Sciences. In 2019 she was elected a foreign member of the Humanities and Social Sciences Division of the Norwegian Academy of Science and Letters. She was elected as a Fellow of the British Academy in 2022.

== Selected publications ==
- Narrators and focalizers: the presentation of the story in the Iliad. Amsterdam 1987. Nachdruck Amsterdam 2004
- Narrative in drama: the art of the Euripidean messenger-speech. Leiden 1991 (Mnemosyne Supplement 116)
- with J. P. Sullivan: Modern critical theory and classical literature. Leiden 1994 (Mnemosyne Supplement 130)
- A Narratological Commentary on the Odyssey. Cambridge 2001
- Studies in ancient Greek narrative. Vol. 1: Narrators, narratees, and narratives in ancient Greek literature. Leiden 2004 (Mnemosyne Supplement 257)
- with Albert Rijksbaron: Sophocles and the Greek language: aspects of diction, syntax and pragmatics. Leiden 2006 (Mnemosyne Supplement 269)
- Studies in ancient Greek narrative. Vol. 2: Time in ancient Greek literature. Leiden 2007 (Mnemosyne Supplement 291)
- Studies in ancient Greek narrative. Vol. 3: Space in ancient Greek literature. Leiden 2012 (Mnemosyne Supplement 39)
- Homer Iliad Book XXII. Cambridge 2012
- Narratology and Classics: A Practical Guide. Oxford 2014.
