= Alfred Kossmann =

Dutch poet

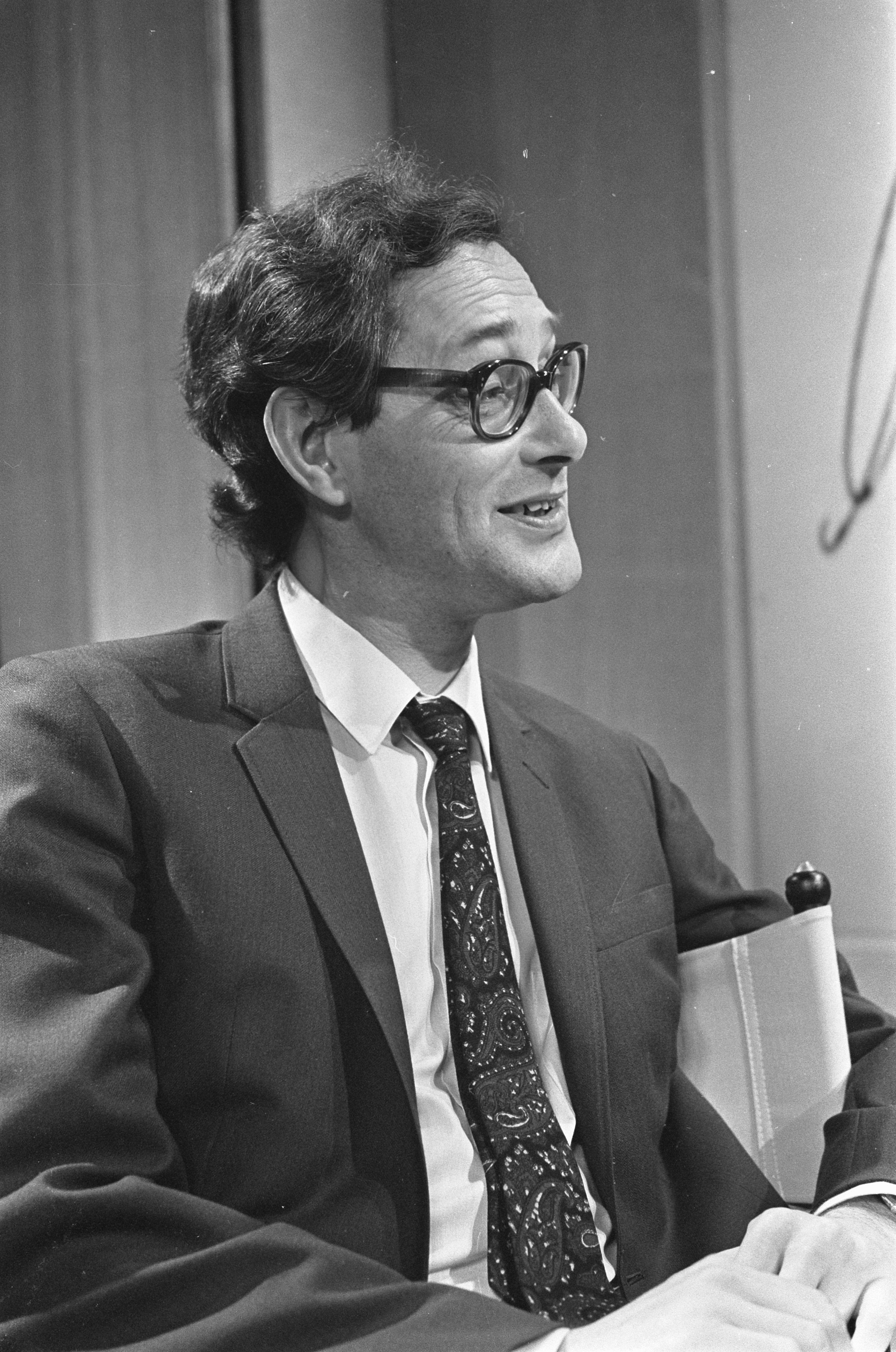
- Alfred Kossmann in 1967
- Born: 31 January 1922; Leiden, Netherlands
- Died: 27 June 1998 (aged 76); Amsterdam, Netherlands
- Occupations: Novelist, poet
- Writing career
- Language: Dutch

Alfred Kossmann (31 January 1922 – 27 June 1998) was a Dutch poet and prose writer. Kossmann and his brother Ernst Kossmann, a distinguished Dutch historian, were twins.

== Biography ==
Born in Leiden, Kossmann was the son of the erudite librarian F. H. Kossmann. He had two brothers. His twin brother Ernst became a historian; his younger brother Bernhard played the violin professionally. The Kossmann family was partly of Jewish descent and they came from Germany before they settled in the Netherlands. Kossmann attended the Gymnasium Erasmianum in Rotterdam but never finished it. Subsequently, he worked for several years in bookshops and publishing houses. In the Second World War, he was arrested. He had to work for two-and-a-half years in Germany, along with his twin brother Ernst. In 1950, Kossmann published a novel, De nederlaag (The defeat), that was based on their experiences during the war.

After the war, he worked mainly in publishing houses. As an experienced traveller, he wrote some travel literature.

In 1972, Kossmann had a car accident that left him disabled. His novel Laatst ging ik spelevaren (Of late I went out boating) was based on these experiences. After the accident, he lived in Greece for several years. He died in Amsterdam.

Kossmann's work is characterized by a sense of irony and detachment.

== Bibliography ==
=== Poetry ===
- Het vuurwerk (1946)
- De bosheks (1951)
- Apologie der varkens (1954)
- De veldtocht en andere gedichten (1959)
- Rotterdam (1969)
- Dagboek uit en thuis (1981)

=== Prose ===
- De nederlaag (1950)
- De moord op Arend Zwigt (1951)
- De linkerhand (1955)
- De hondenplaag (1956)
- De bekering (1957)
- De misdaad (1962)
- De smaak van groene kaas (1965)
- Reisverhaal (1966)
- Proeve van vaderland (1967)
- De vrouwenhaters (1968)
- De architect (1969)
- De wind en de lichten der schepen (1970)
- Ga weg, ga weg, zei de vogel (1971)
- Waarover wil je dat ik schrijf (columns) (1972)
- Laatst ging ik spelevaren (1973)
- O roos, je bent ziek (1979)
- Geur der droefenis (1980)
- De vrijheid, de leegte, de dood (1981)
- Hoogmoed en dronkenschap (1981)
- Een gouden beker (1982)
- Drempel van ouderdom (1983)
- In alle onschuld (1984)
- Rampspoed. Novelle van de leraar (1985)
- Slecht zicht (1986)
- Duurzame gewoonten of Uit het leven van een romanfiguur (1987)
- Een verjaardag (1989)
- Familieroman (1990)
- Huldigingen (1995)
- De mannen waaruit ik besta (columns) (1999)

== Awards ==
- 1951 - Lucy B. en C.W. van der Hoogtprijs (De nederlaag)
- 1960 - Prijs van de Stichting Kunstenaarsverzet 1942-1945 (collected short stories)
- 1964 - ANWB-prijs (Reislust)
- 1965 - Vijverbergprijs (De smaak van groene kaas)
- 1972 - Marianne Philips-prijs (collected works, especially Ga weg, ga weg zei de vogel)
- 1980 - Constantijn Huygensprijs (collected works)
- 1996 - Libris Prize (Huldigingen)
