= Jacob Christiaan Koningsberger =

Dutch biologist and politician

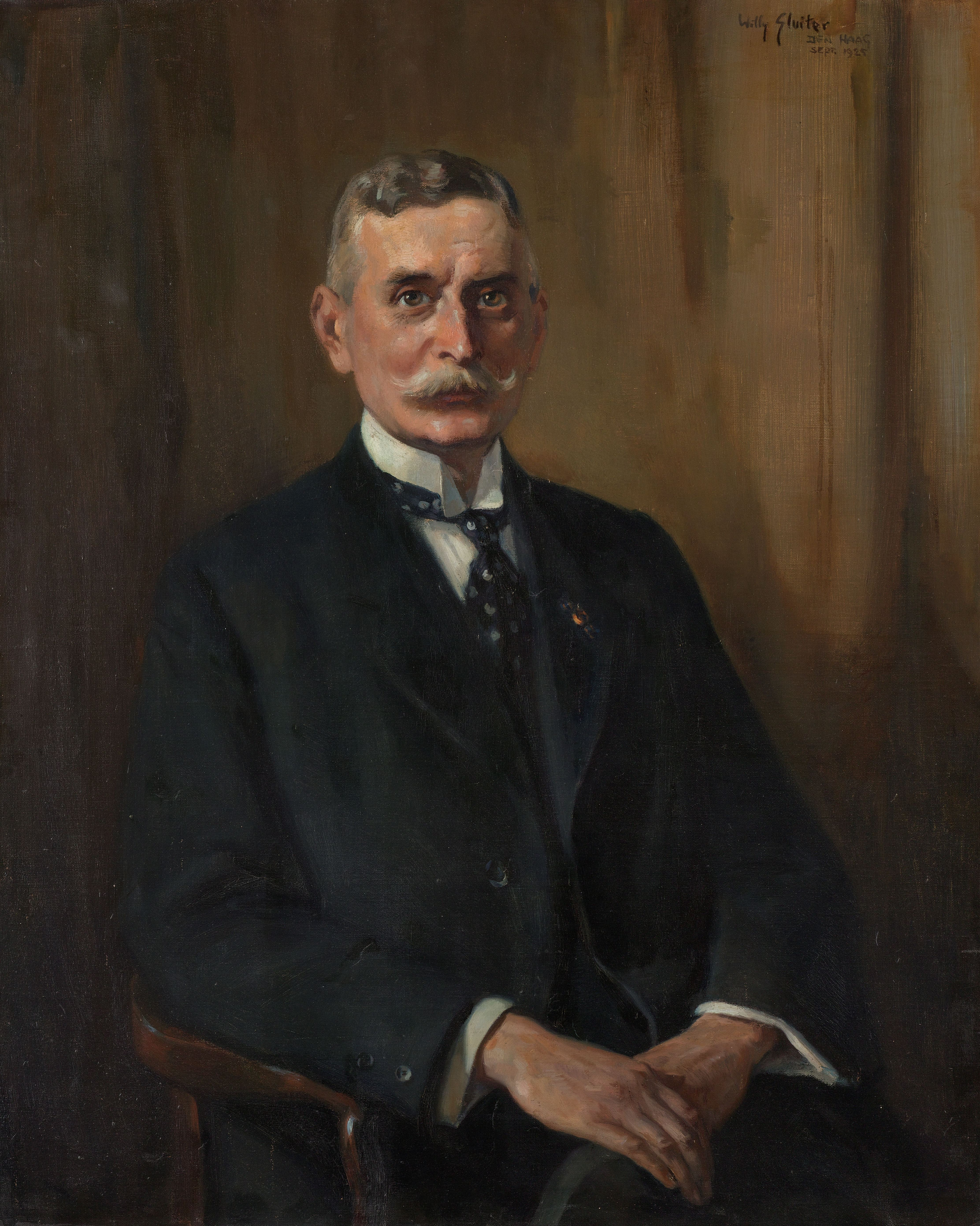
- Portrait of Koningsberger, 1925
- Born: 17 January 1867; Hazerswoude, Netherlands
- Died: 19 March 1951 (aged 84); Scheveningen, Den Haag, Netherlands
- Occupation(s): Botanist, politician
- Spouses: Manuella Ursule Mariana Hellendoorn (1894–1899); Bertha Rosina Margaretha Lang (1902–his death)
- Children: 3, including: Jacob Christiaan Koningsberger (son); Victor Jacob Koningsberger (son)

Minister of the Colonies of the Netherlands
- In office 8 March 1926 – 10 August 1929
- Preceded by: Charles Welter
- Succeeded by: Simon de Graaff

Jacob Christiaan Koningsberger (17 January 1867 – 19 March 1951) was a Dutch biologist and politician. He spent much of his life in the Dutch East Indies, where he wrote extensively about the flora and fauna of Java. He was extensively involved in the Lands Plantentuin in Buitenzorg (now the Bogor Botanical Gardens in Bogor), serving as its director between 1910 and 1918. In politics, he served as the first chairman of the Volksraad (1918–1919), as well as Minister of the Colonies under Dirk Jan de Geer (1926–1929). An independent, he had liberal leanings and allowed more indigenous representation in governance.

== Early life ==
Koningsberger was born in Hazerswoude, South Holland, Netherlands, on 17 January 1867. The son of Victor Jacob Koningsberger, a minister with the Dutch Reformed Church, and Josina Cornelia Tieleman, Koningsberger moved to Utrecht in 1871. He completed his studies in that city, ultimately receiving a degree in biology from Utrecht University in 1889; he also studied mathematics. After some time as an assistant to the botanist N.W.P. Rauwenhoff, on 28 October 1891 Koningsberger defended his doctoral thesis: Bijdrage tot de kennis der zetmeelvorming bij de angiospermen (Contribution to the Knowledge of Starch Formation in Angiosperms).

In 1894, after teaching botany and zoology in 's-Hertogenbosch, Koningsberger departed for the Dutch East Indies. In the colony, he focused primarily on the pests that affected coffee cultivation; he produced a two-volume treatise on this subject, De dierlijke vijanden der koffiecultuur op Java (The Animal Enemies of Coffee Culture in Java, 1897 and 1901). By 1898 he was working for the Lands Plantentuin in Buitenzorg (now the Bogor Botanical Gardens in Bogor) under Melchior Treub. He was entrusted with the Xth Department for Agricultural-Zoological Research, and in 1894 he established the Landbouw Zoologish (now the Bogor Zoology Museum).

Koningsberger returned to the Netherlands in 1899, but had begun working the Indies again by the early 1900s. During this second period in the Indies, Koningsberger wrote several papers on crop diseases. He also produced a twelve-volume text on the flora and fauna found in Java, Java, zoölogisch en biologisch (Java, Zoology and Biology); this was the first zoological profile of the island. During this period, Koningsberger promoted nature conservation in the Indies, and his influence facilitated the passage of the colony's first conservation law in 1910.

In 1910, Koningsberger was appointed the director of the Lands Plantentuin. During his leadership, a conservation area was established in Sibolangit, Deli Serdang, in 1914; it has since become a botanical garden. He was a vocal proponent for using "pure" science, arguing in one speech that "every contribution that further adds to the knowledge of this land's nature – still so very secretive in many ways – can only contribute to increasing the inviolability of our bill of ownership".

Koningsberger spent some time as the administrator of the Landbouwschool (now part of IPB University). Between 1915 and 1916, he acted on behalf of Hermanus Johannes Lovink as the director of the Indies' Department of Agriculture, Industry, and Trade; he wrote that he preferred his position with the Lands Plantentuin, as it had fewer administrative challenges.

== Political career ==
In his capacity as the director of the Lands Plantentuin, Koningsberger regularly interacted with the Governors-General of the Dutch East Indies, including Alexander Idenburg and Johan Paul van Limburg Stirum. Through these connections, he gained a reputation for non-partisanship and intelligence; consequently, Koningsberger was made the chairman of the Volksraad for the 1918–1919 period. According to the Dutch historian Wim van den Doel, this leadership was unsuccessful; Koningsberger was uncomfortable with his role, and perceived by the Governor-General as failing to direct discussions within the body.

Following the flu epidemic of 1918, which afflicted Koningsberger as well as thousands in Java, he decided to return to the Netherlands with his family. They moved to Utrecht, where he chaired the Jaarbeurs and administered the Veeartsenijkundige Hoogeschool (now the Rijks Veeartsenijschool). He remained involved in discussion over the fate of the Indies, supporting the Dutch Ethical Policy and its approach to political development whilst simultaneously advocating for continued Dutch leadership. In a 1925 speech, he emphasized that the Netherlands required an ethical policy both to pay its debt of honour to the indigenous population and to acknowledge the growing sense of nation in the colony.

On 8 March 1926, Koningsberger was made Minister of the Colonies by Prime Minister Dirk Jan de Geer. At the time, he was not affiliated with a political party, though he had liberal leanings. On 26 March, he appointed Andries Cornelis Dirk de Graeff the Governor-General of the Dutch East Indies. Feeling too distanced from the contemporary situation in the Indies to make effective policy, he entrusted most issues to de Graeff and sought to avoid conflict. He did, however, allow indigenous representation in the Council of the Indies and oversaw an indigenous majority in the Volksraad. Consequently, he was criticized by his predecessor, Charles Welter, as a mouthpiece of the Indies government. Even as he opened these opportunities, he continued to espouse the importance of maintaining Dutch leadership, rejecting the idea of departing from Western codes of law in favour of certain population groups.

== Later life ==
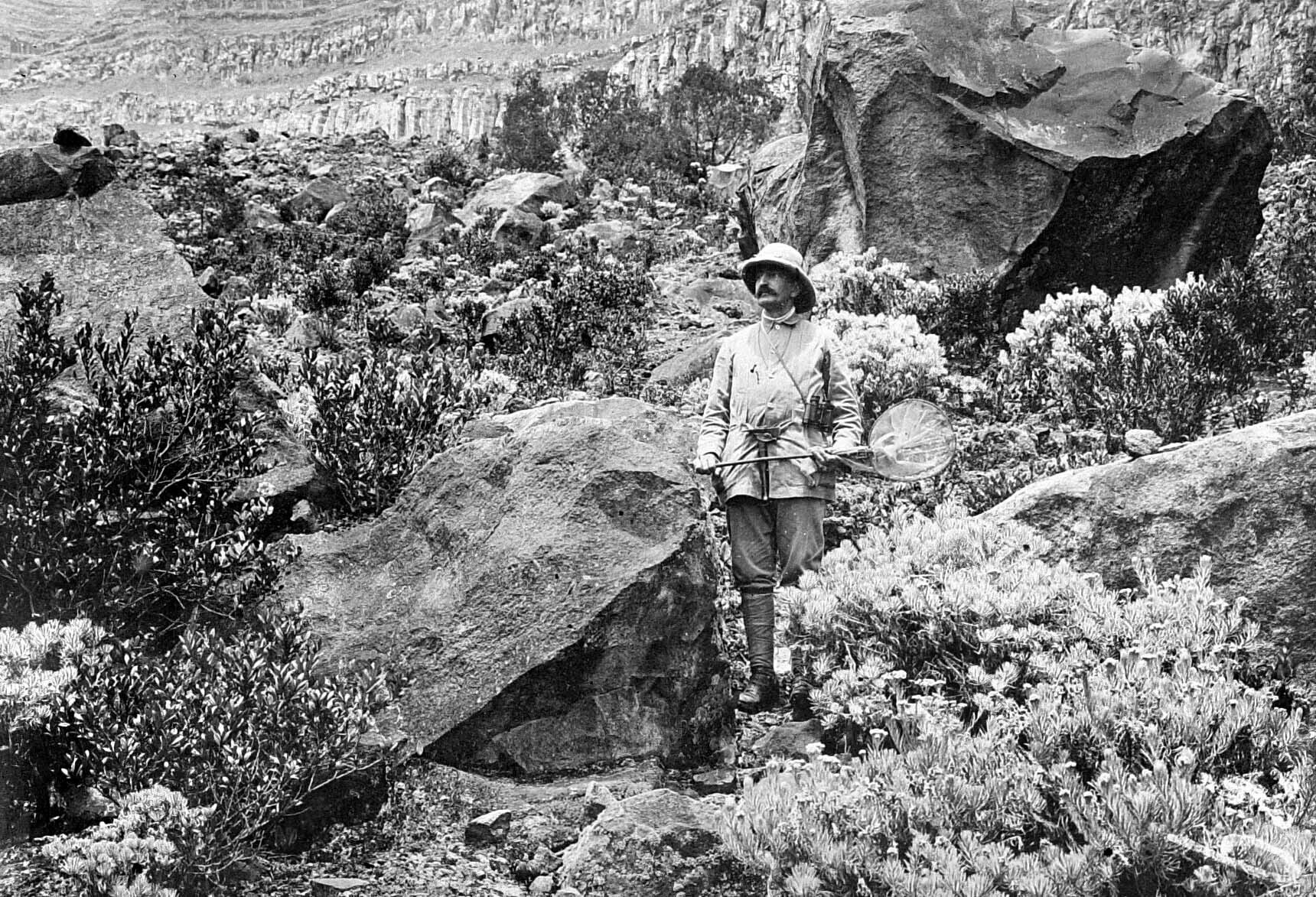
Koningsberger on Mount Gede with a Javanese edelweiss, c. 1942

When de Geer resigned on 10 August 1929, Koningsberger returned to private life. He wrote several memoires of his time in the Indies. He was also involved in several conservation organizations, co-founding the Netherlands Commission for International Nature Conservation (Nederlandse Commissie voor Internationale Natuurbescherming) in 1929 and serving a member of the board on the Vereniging Natuurmonumenten in 1934. He died in Scheveningen, Den Haag, Netherlands, on 19 March 1951, after a brief illness. He was interred at the Den en Rust Cemetery in Utrecht.

In recognition of his service, Koningsberger received several honours. He was appointed a Commander in the Order of Orange-Nassau, as well as a Knight in the Order of the Netherlands Lion. He also received the Legion of Honour, the Order of the Crown, and the Order of the Black Star.

== Personal life ==
Koningsberger was married twice. On 29 March 1894, he married Manuella Ursule Mariana Hellendoorn, with whom he had two sons. Three years after her 1899 death, he married Bertha Rosina Margaretha Lang. The couple had one son.

Koningsberger's son Victor was a professor of botany in Utrecht, specializing in plant physiology; he was also the president of the Royal Tropical Institute in Amsterdam. Another son, Jacob, was a preacher with the Dutch Reformed Church and worked with the military.

== Selected publications ==
- Bijdrage tot de kennis der zetmeelvorming bij de angiospermen (Contribution to the Knowledge of Starch Formation in Angiosperms; 1891)
- Inleiding in de systematiek der phanerogamen (Introduction to the Systematics of Phanerogamens, 1893)
- De dierlijke vijanden der koffiecultuur op Java (The Animal Enemies of Coffee Culture in Java, two volumes, 1897 and 1901)
- Overzicht der schadelijke en nuttige insecten van Java (Overview of the Harmful and Beneficial Insects of Java, two volumes, 1898 and 1908)
- De vogels van Java en hunne oeconomische beteekenis (The Birds of Java and their Economic Significance, two volumes, 1901 and 1909)
- De zoogdieren van Java (The Mammals of Java, 1902)
- Ziekten van rijst, tabak, thee en andere cultuurgewassen, die door insecten worden veroorzaakt (Diseases of Rice, Tobacco, Tea and Other Cultivated Crops Caused by Insects; 1903)
- Tripang en tripangvisscherij in Nederlandsch-Indië (Tripang and Tripang Fishing in the Dutch East Indies, 1904)
- Java, zoölogisch en biologisch (Java, Zoology and Biology, twelve volumes, 1911–1915)
- Hollandsche jongelieden en Indische landbouw (Dutch Youth and Agriculture in the Indies, 1925)

== Works cited ==
- Dew, Edward (2013). The Difficult Flowering of Surinam: Ethnicity and Politics in a Plural Society. Dordrecht: Springer Netherlands. ISBN 9789401732789.
- Doel, HW van den. "Koningsberger, Jacob Christiaan (1867-1951)" (in Dutch). Huygens Institute for the History of the Netherlands. Archived from the original on 20 July 2019.
- "Dr. J. C. Koningsberger overleden" [Dr. J. C. Koningsberger passes]. Trouw (in Dutch). 20 March 1951. p. 6.
- "Dr. J.Ch. Koningsberger" (in Dutch). Parlementair Documentatie Centrum. Archived from the original on 27 September 2020.
- "Familieberichten" [Family News]. Trouw (in Dutch). 20 March 1951. p. 6.
- Goss, Andrew (2009). "Decent Colonialism? Pure Science and Colonial Ideology in the Netherlands East Indies, 1910-1929". Journal of Southeast Asian Studies. 40 (1): 187–214. doi:10.1017/S002246340900006X. JSTOR 27751556.
- Hoogerwerf, A. (1970). Udjung Kulon: The Land of the Last Javan Rhinoceros. Leiden: E. J. Brill.
- "Oud-minister Koningsberger †" [Former Minister Koningsberger †]. Niuewsblad van Het Noorden (in Dutch). 20 March 1951. p. 6.
- Raalte, M. H. van (1966). "In Memoriam: Victor Jacob Koningsberger". Plant and Soil. 25 (1): 1–2. Bibcode:1966PlSoi..25D...2V. doi:10.1007/BF01347956. JSTOR 42932632.
- Sufa, Theresia (1 September 2019). "Bogor Zoology Museum: Symbol of national scientific progress celebrates 125th anniversary". The Jakarta Post. Archived from the original on 3 December 2019.
- Wisnubroto, Kristantyo (22 October 2020). "Menikmati Lagi Agrowisata Sibolangit" [Enjoying Again Agritourism in Sibolangit]. Government of Indonesia. Archived from the original on 26 November 2020.

Political offices
Preceded by Charles Welter	Minister of Colonial Affairs; 1926–1929	Succeeded by Simon de Graaff
