= Victor Jacob Koningsberger =

Dutch botanist and academic (1895–1966)

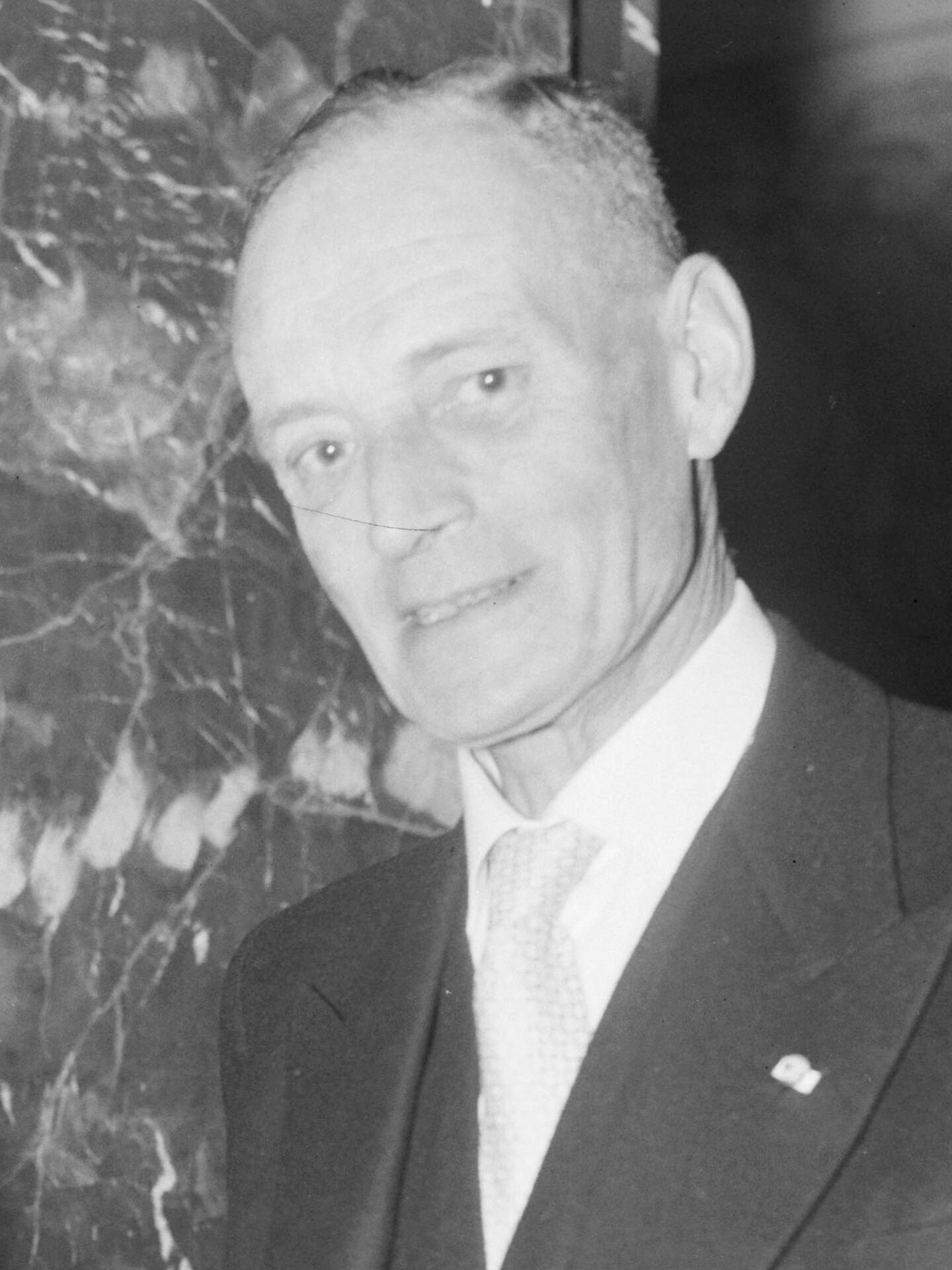
- Koningsberger in 1960
- Born: 10 February 1895; Buitenzorg, Dutch East Indies
- Died: 28 February 1966 (aged 71); Bilthoven, Utrecht, Netherlands
- Occupations: Botanist, academic
- Spouse: Tilly Dijkstra
- Father: Jacob Christiaan Koningsberger
- Relatives: Jacob Christiaan Koningsberger (brother)

Academic background
- Education: Gymnasium Erasmianum
- Alma mater: Utrecht University
- Thesis: Tropismus und Wachstum (1922)
- Doctoral advisor: Frits Went

Signature
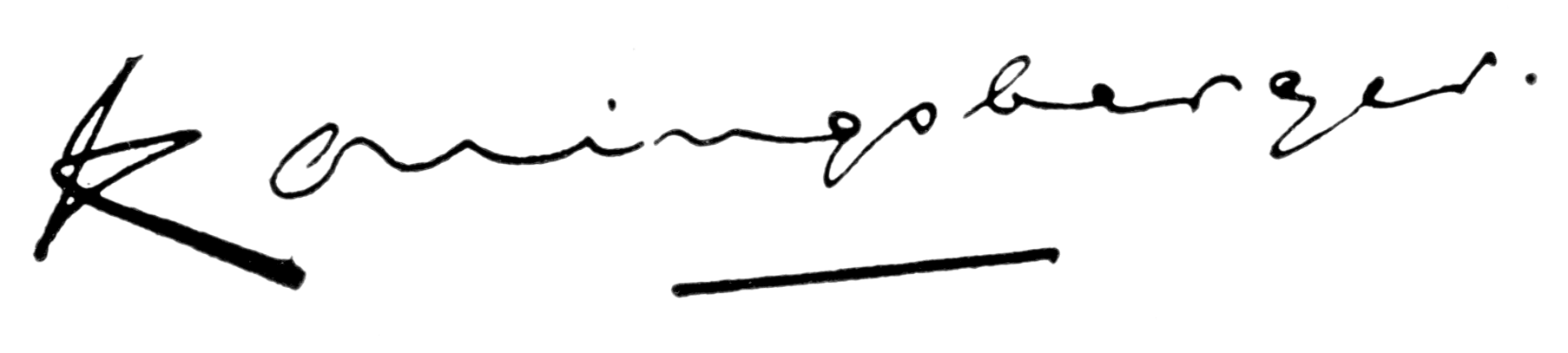

Victor Jacob Koningsberger (10 February 1895 – 28 February 1966) was a Dutch botanist and academic. Born in the Dutch East Indies, he completed his studies in Rotterdam and Utrecht, defending his doctoral dissertation – an exploration of tropism focusing on the influence of light on plant growth – in 1922. He subsequently spent a decade in the Indies administering centres for sugar cane experimentation before returning to the Netherlands in 1934 to replace his teacher Frits Went as Professor of Botany at Utrecht University. In this capacity, he continued to research tropism. He served as the rector of Utrecht University between 1952 and 1953.

Koningsberger was Chairman of the Royal Tropical Institute from 1951 through 1965, as well as a member of the Royal Netherlands Academy of Arts and Sciences from 1946 until his death. For his contributions, he was inducted into the Orders of the Netherlands Lion and the Orange-Nassau. He has been commemorated with a series of lectures, as well as a namesake building in the Utrecht Science Park.

== Early life and career ==
Koningsberger was born in Buitenzorg, Dutch East Indies (now Bogor, Indonesia), on 10 February 1895, to the biologist Jacob Christiaan Koningsberger and his wife Manuella Ursule Mariana Hellendoorn. In 1899, aged four, he travelled with his parents to the Netherlands; his mother died during the journey. Consequently, when the elder Koningsberger returned to the Indies in the early 1900s, Victor and his younger brother Jacob remained with relatives in the Netherlands. Victor studied at the Gymnasium Erasmianum in Rotterdam, graduating in 1914.

As the Netherlands faced the First World War, Koningsberger was kept as a reserve officer. He received a study leave of three days per week in 1917, using this time to study biology at Utrecht University; in May 1918, he completed his candidate's exam cum laude. Koningsberger continued his studies under the botanist Frits Went and the zoologist Hermann Jacques Jordan, simultaneously attending privatissima held by the psychiatrist Cornelis Winkler. He passed his doctoral examination, again with honours, in 1920. During this period, he married Tilly Dijkstra, a fellow student and assistant at Went's botanical laboratory.

On 23 June 1922, Koningsberger completed his doctoral studies after defending his dissertation Tropismus und Wachstum (Tropism and Growth). Building on earlier studies by Anton Hendrik Blaauw, which hypothesized that the curvature of plants was affected by unequal lighting during growth, as well as more than a decade's work in Went's laboratory, Koningsberger designed and employed an innovative automatic precision auxanometer that allowed him to accurately measure the growth of oat seedlings in consistent lighting and temperatures without introducing geotropic curvature. He concluded that, although the evidence indicated a high level of complexity in light's influence on growth, Blaauw's hypothesis was strongly supported.

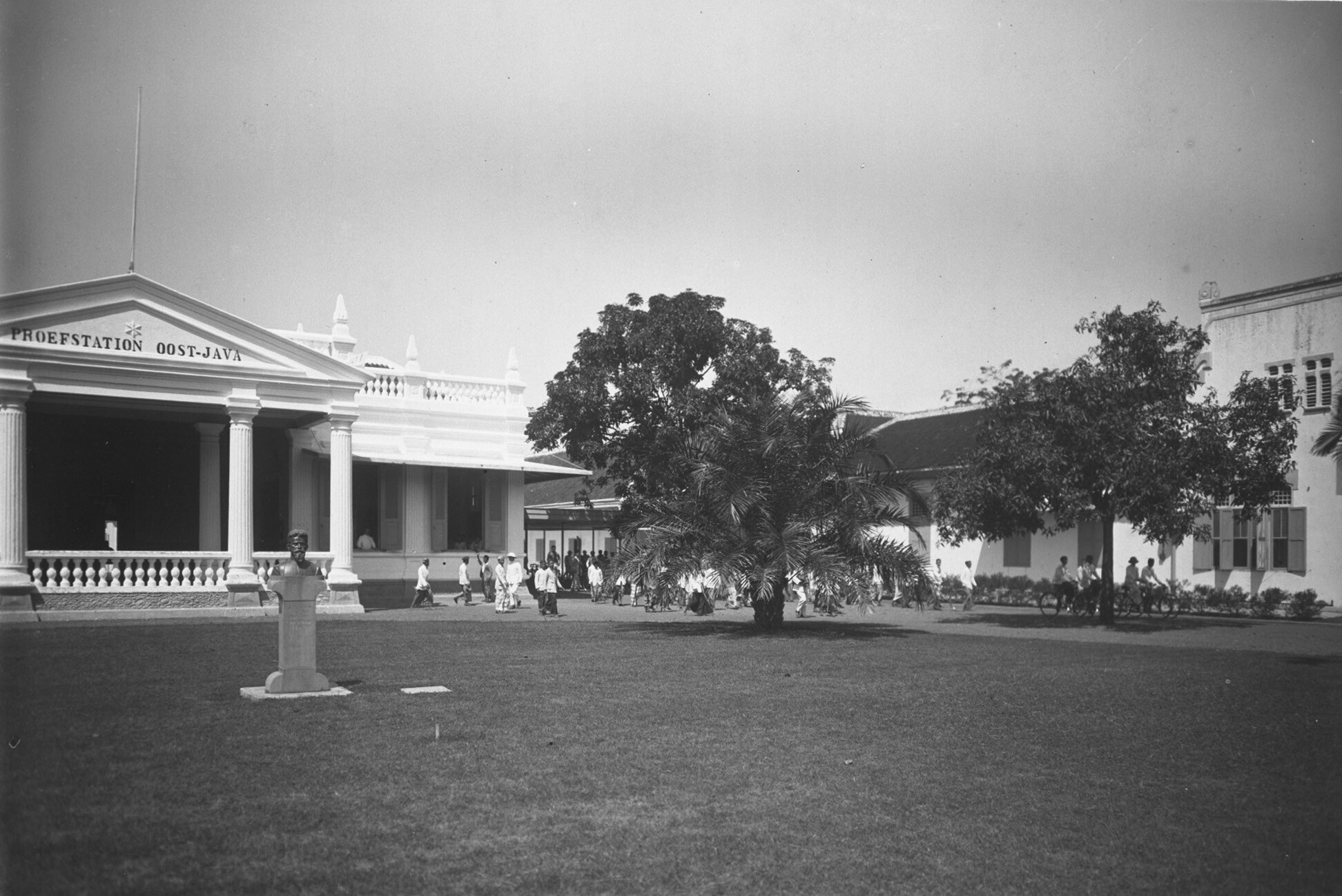
The Sugar Experimentation Station in Pasuruan, which Koningsberger led from 1926 through 1934

After graduating, Koningsberger spent a year in Utrecht as Went's head research assistant. In 1924, he travelled to the Dutch East Indies, taking control of a station for sugar cane experimentation in Cirebon, East Java. Two years later, following the resignation of Ph. van Harreveld, he was made the director of a larger station in Pasuruan. Several researchers resigned in protest of Koningsberger's appointment, feeling passed over by a younger and unproven researcher. Nonetheless, over the course of eight years Koningsberger cultivated a sense of solidarity in the station, which employed 32 staff at the peak of the sugar boom. As production waned in the early 1930s, Koningsberger oversaw the downsizing of the station. Writing in Plant and Soil, M. H. van Raalte described the sugar cane industry under Koningsberger as "an example of scientifically guided agriculture in the tropics." In 1931 Koningsberger became a corresponding member of the Royal Netherlands Academy of Arts and Sciences (KNAW).

== Professorship ==
After a decade in the Indies, Koningsberger returned to the Netherlands to replace Went as Professor of Botany at Utrecht University, effective 2 July 1934. On this date he also resigned his corresponding KNAW membership. Three months later, on 24 September, he delivered his inaugural speech, "Sunt certi denique fines" ("The Boundaries are Certain"). In the speech, he explored the apparent discrepancies between the certainties of physics and chemistry and the uncertainties of physiological research. He attributed these discrepancies to the continuity of life processes, which affect the results of physiological endeavours, whereas chemistry research was done in more constant settings. Throughout his academic career, Koningsberger retained an interest in studies of growth and tropism; his efforts to understand these processes included explorations of the effects of growth substance on cell membranes, as well as the mechanisms of auxin activity.

In his interpersonal relations, Koningsberger was recognized for his compassion and sympathy. He and Tilly opened their home to Koningsberger's colleagues and students. On 25 November 1940, shortly following the expulsion of Jewish academics in the Nazi-occupied Netherlands, Koningsberger spoke out, delivering a speech that began "My conscience compels me to commemorate here, with deep sorrow and disappointment, the dismissal from their office of a number of Dutch colleagues, solely on grounds of their origin or religion." (Note: Original: "Mijn geweten gebiedt mij hier met diepe smart en teleurstelling te gedenken de ontheffing uit de uitoefening van hun ambt van een aantal Nederlandse collega's, uitsluitend om reden van afkomst of geloof.") According to the historian Henk van Rinsum, Koningsberger was the first to publicly oppose the expulsion; a similar speech was delivered by Rudolph Cleveringa the following day. Koningsberger was later detained and sent to Kamp Sint-Michielsgestel. He was released in December 1943 and returned to teaching in 1944.

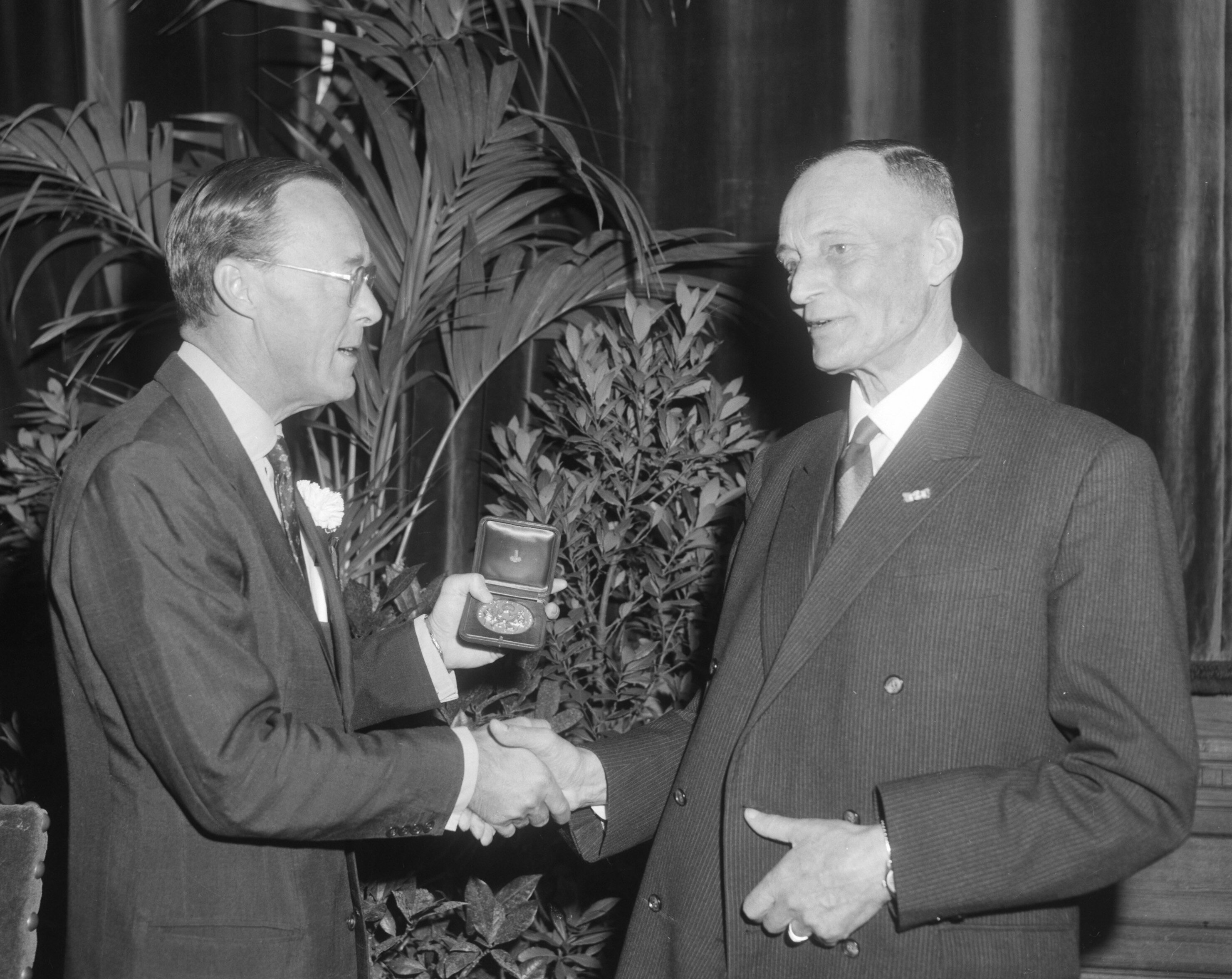
Koningsberger (right) with Prince Bernhard of Lippe-Biesterfeld in 1965

Koningsberger was dispatched to the Indies in 1946 to survey the situation of sugar cultivation in the colony, which had proclaimed its independence the previous year following the withdrawal of the Empire of Japan. Two years after this three-month survey, he returned to the archipelago to work on restoring the ravaged sugar industry; the experimentation station, for instance, had few remaining workers and little material. He remained in this position through 1950, the year after the Netherlands recognized the sovereignty of the Indonesian nation.

After his return to the Netherlands, Koningsberger assumed several leadership roles in academic institutions. From 1951 through 1965, he served as the Chairman of the Royal Tropical Institute; in recognition of his service in this capacity, he received a medal from Prince Bernhard of Lippe-Biesterfeld in 1965. Between 1952 and 1953, he served as the rector of Utrecht University. Having become a member of the Mathematical and Physical Sciences division of the Royal Netherlands Academy of Arts and Sciences in June 1946, Koningsberger remained an active member of the academy for the rest of his life. He served as chairman of the Biological Council, in which capacity he promoted the continued use of biology in high school final examinations, and as a member of the Central Bureau for Fungal Cultures. Between 1960 and 1965, he served as the Deputy Chairman of the academy's Mathematical and Physical Sciences division.

Koningsberger contracted a viral disease and underwent surgery in 1965. On 1 September of that year, he retired from Utrecht University. He died on 28 February 1966 in Bilthoven. It was announced that he would be cremated in Westerveld.

== Honours ==
Koningsberger was made a knight in the Order of the Netherlands Lion, as well as a commander in the Order of Orange-Nassau. In 1968, a statue of him was unveiled by Prince Bernhard in the courtyard of the Royal Tropical Institute in Amsterdam. In commemoration of Koningsberger's opposition to the expulsion of Jewish academics during the Second World War, between 2010 and 2015 Utrecht University sponsored the Koningsberg Lecture, which focused on human rights issues; the final lecture, "Upstanders, Whistle-Blowers, and Rescuers", was delivered by Dean of Harvard Law School Martha Minow. In 2015, the Victor J. Koningsberger Building was opened at the Utrecht Science Park campus of Utrecht University. Designed by the architectural firm Ector Hoogstad, the 15,000-square-metre (160,000 sq ft) building is used by the faculties of science, geosciences and medicine.

== Works cited ==
- Arisz, W.H. (1967). "Levensbericht V.J. Koningsberger" [Obituary of V.J. Koningsberger]. Jaarboek, 1965-1966 [Yearbook, 1965–1966] (PDF) (in Dutch). Amsterdam: Royal Netherlands Academy of Arts and Sciences. pp. 329–339. Archived from the original (PDF) on 1 June 2023.
- Doel, HW van den. "Koningsberger, Jacob Christiaan (1867-1951)" (in Dutch). Huygens Institute for the History of the Netherlands. Archived from the original on 20 July 2019.
- "Koningsbergerlezing" [Koningsberger Lecture] (in Dutch). Utrecht University. Archived from the original on 29 March 2024.
- Minow, Martha (2017). "Upstanders, Whistle-Blowers, and Rescuers". Utah Law Review. 2017 (9).
- "Prof.dr. V.J. Koningsberger (1895 - 1966)". Catalogus Professorum (in Dutch). Utrecht University. Archived from the original on 5 March 2016.
- "Prof. Koningsberger overleden" [Prof. Koningsberger passes]. Twentsch dagblad Tubantia (in Dutch). 1 March 1966. p. 11.
- Raalte, M. H. van (1966). "In Memoriam: Victor Jacob Koningsberger". Plant and Soil. 25 (1): 1–2. Bibcode:1966PlSoi..25D...2V. doi:10.1007/BF01347956. JSTOR 42932632.
- Rinsum, Henk J. van (2023). Universiteit Utrecht en koloniale kennis [Utrecht University and Colonial Knowledge] (in Dutch). Gelderland: Walburg Press. ISBN 9789464562002.
- "(untitled)". Algemeen Handelsblad (in Dutch). 21 December 1968. p. 3.
- "Victor J. Koningsbergergebouw Universiteit Utrecht" [Victor J. Koningsbergerger Building, Utrecht University] (in Dutch). Stevens van Dijck. Archived from the original on 7 December 2022.
