= Gymnasium Erasmianum =

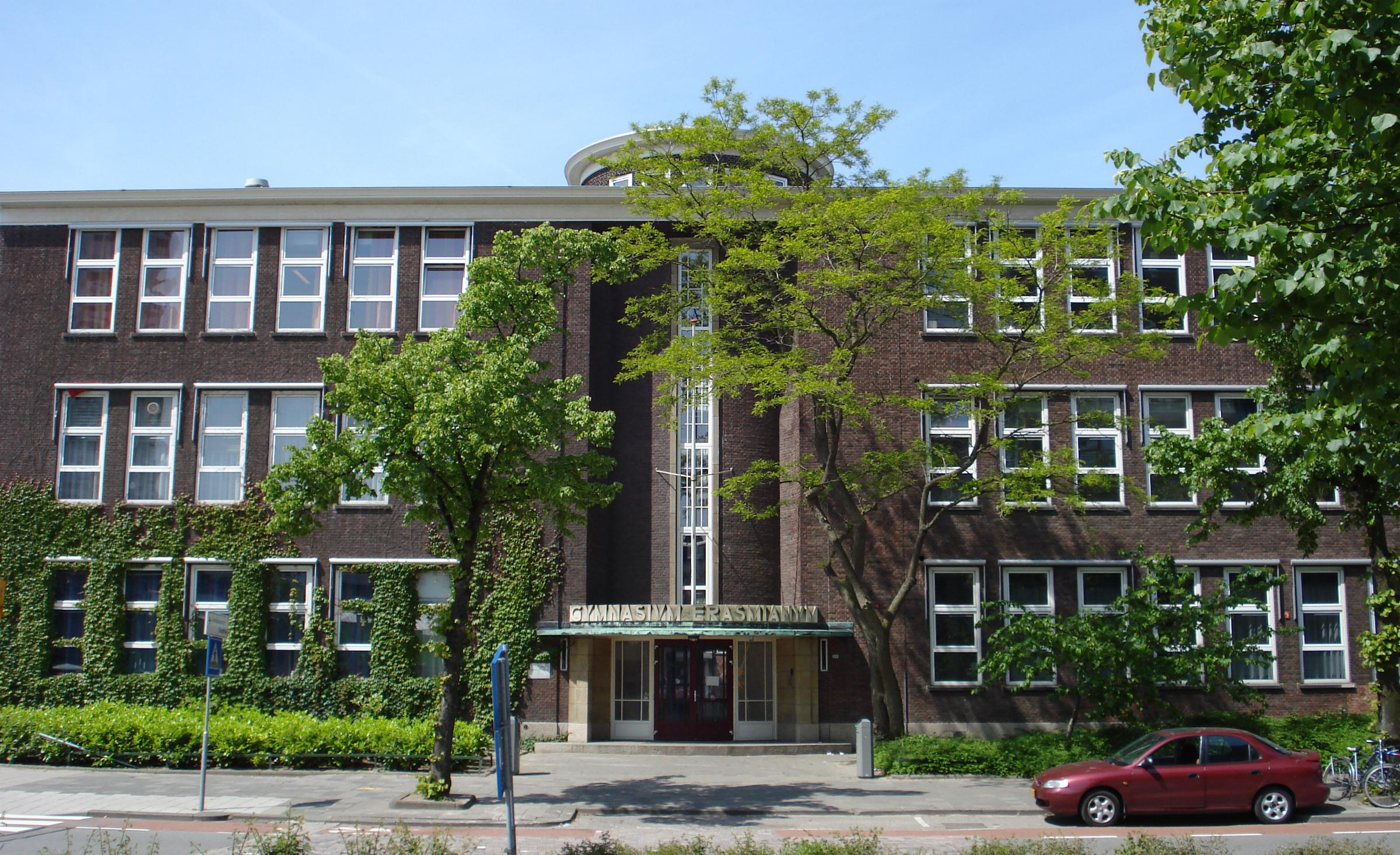

Location
- Rotterdam, Netherlands
- Coordinates: 51.912085°N 4.468689°E

Information
- Established: 1328; 698 years ago
- Principal: C.K. van den Berg
- Website: www.erasmiaans.nl

The Gymnasium Erasmianum is a school in Rotterdam (also known under its Dutch name "Erasmiaans Gymnasium").

== History ==
Founded in 1328, it is the second oldest school in the Netherlands with recorded date of establishment (after the Johan de Witt Gymnasium in Dordrecht, established 1253). Stedelijk Gymnasium van 's-Hertogenbosch first mentioned in 1274 and Stedelijk Gymnasium Leiden first mentioned in 1323 may also be older, but their exact date of establishment is unrecorded. The privilege to found a Latin school was granted to the town of Rotterdam before Rotterdam received full city rights and therefore the school predates the city status of Rotterdam by nearly twenty years. It was renamed in 1842, after the famous Rotterdam theologian and humanist Desiderius Erasmus (1466–1536). The school is more than a century older than its namesake, and it is unclear whether he attended it.

The school was located at the corner of the Coolsingel and the Laurensstraat until 1937, nowadays C&A, a clothing store, is located at that place, and the school at the Wytemaweg. In May 1940, the center of Rotterdam was bombed during the German invasion of the Netherlands, but the school building survived as it was outside the focus of the bombing and subsequent fires. After Dutch surrender, the occupying German troops used the building as one of their headquarters.

== Profile ==
In the Netherlands, there are several levels of secondary education, with most theoretical vwo being pre-university secondary education. Many secondary provide wide-scope community schools, sometimes with middle school like classes. Some gymnasia, including the Gymnasium Erasmianum maintained its profile as separate school. Like all Gymnasia, Latin and Ancient Greek are mandatory courses in the curriculum of Gymnasium Erasmianum.

The school is widely known for its large number of students with non-Dutch roots. There are more students with non-Dutch roots at the Gymnasium Erasmianum than at any other Gymnasium in the Netherlands.

The school serves 1,170 students and 80 teachers. The school's motto is "Ex Pluribus Unum", meaning "unity through diversity".

== Notable people ==
=== Teachers ===
- J. H. Leopold, Dutch poet
- H.B.G. Casimir, physicist
- Édouard Piaget, Swiss entomologist

=== Students ===
- Gijs van Aardenne, politician (MP, Minister of Finance, Minister of Economic Affairs)
- Harry Borghouts, politician (Queen's Commissioner in the province North Holland)
- Jacob Clay, physicist
- Daan Bovenberg, professional footballer
- Edsger W. Dijkstra, computer scientist
- Robbert Dijkgraaf, theoretical physicist and politician (minister of education culture and science)
- Ida Gerhardt, a student of Leopold; poet
- Jan Coenraad Kamerbeek, classical scholar
- Victor Jacob Koningsberger, botanist
- Alfred Kossmann, poet and prose writer
- E. H. Kossmann, historian
- Herman Johannes Lam, botanist
- Ramsey Nasr, poet and actor
- Jan Romein, journalist and historian
- Ebru Umar, columnist
- H. S. Versnel, historian of ancient religion
- Johan Witteveen, economist, politician, and author

== The RGB ==
The RGB (Rotterdamse Gymnasiasten Bond) is the school's society, organized by the students for the students. Every year the RGB organizes parties, theater, music and dance evenings and several cultural events.

The RGB has its own anthem in Latin:

Vivat haec societas
Gaudium quae paret.
Semper floreat et crescat,
Longe et late clara fiat,
Vivat haec societas
Erasmi Alumnorum.

Vivant semper Socii
In sodalitate.
Vivant tutor et fautores,
Virgines et amatores,
Vivat haec societas
Erasmi Alumnorum

Every year the students elect a new board for the Bond. Any senior student on the school can be elected. The board consists of several functions, with a Latin name:

Praeses; president
Quaestor; treasurer
Ab-actis; secretary
Vice-Praeses; vice-president
Cultus; organizer of cultural events
Sporticus; organizer of sport events
Assessor; creates posters, memberships cards, and event tickets

== Other organizations ==
Other than the RGB, there are several active organizations on the Gymnasium Erasmianum, organised by the school's board, teachers and students alike. Some examples are;

- De Tolle lege: the school's own newspaper.
- Koinothrex: A group of students who arrange a camp for the first class once a year.
- Debatingsociety Pro et Contra: The society organizes debates available to the whole school. Every year they go to several tournaments.
- The GSA: The Gender and Sexuality Association is an organisation consisting of students that promotes freedom and outing of gender and sexuality within the school.
- The LLR: The Leerlingenraad is an organization in which students are given the possibility to have a say in the decisions made at the school
- The MR: the medezeggenschapsraad
- Semper Floreat: a society for alumni
- The Ouderraad: an organization which grants parents the possibility to make some changes to the school.
- De Techniek: a group of students responsible for the technical support of events on school.
- The Remix-Crew: A group of students that organize a musical event called 'Remix' twice a year

== See also ==
- List of the oldest schools in the world
