= Ernst Kossmann =

Dutch historian (1922–2003)

Ernst Heinrich Kossmann (31 January 1922 – 8 November 2003), often named as E. H. Kossmann in his books, was a Dutch historian. He was professor of Modern History at the University of Groningen in the Netherlands. His magnum opus is The Low Countries. History of the Southern and Northern Netherlands.

== Life and work ==
Born in Leiden, Kossmann was the son of the erudite librarian F. H. Kossmann. He had two brothers. His twin brother Alfred became a writer; his younger brother, Bernhard, played the violin professionally. The Kossmann family was of Jewish descent and they came from Germany before they settled in the Netherlands. Kossmann attended the Gymnasium Erasmianum in Rotterdam. The Second World War meant an interruption of his education. He was arrested during a raid, was sent to Vught concentration camp, and had to work for two-and-a-half years in Germany, together with his twin brother Alfred. The latter wrote a novel, De Nederlaag (The Defeat), that was based on their experiences during the war. After the war he studied history at Leiden University in the Netherlands. He graduated in 1950 and in the same year married his fellow student Johanna Putto.

After their marriage the couple went to Paris. In 1954 Kossmann obtained his Ph.D. from Leiden University, with a doctoral thesis entitled La Fronde. In 1957 he went to London as professor of Dutch history and Institutions. In 1962 he became professor at the University College London. In 1966 he became professor of modern history at the University of Groningen. In 1981 he delivered his Huizinga Lecture in the Pieterskerk in Leiden. He retired as professor in 1987 and died in Groningen in 2003.

Kossmann was considered a writer with a refined style, and an erudite scholar. His intellectual outlook was sceptical, ironical, detached. He published several books in collaboration with his wife Johanna Kossmann-Putto. In an interview in 2007, his former student Frank Ankersmit gives a description of him:

He had an unusually strong and fascinating personality -- I never met anyone even remotely coming close to what he was like. Just to give you an idea: he was all that one might associate with François Guizot, very much aloof, very intelligent, both impossible to get close to and yet very much accessible and blessed with the rhetorical powers of a Pericles. If he had decided for a political career, the recent history of my country would have been completely different from what it is now. It rarely happened, but if he really felt that this was necessary he could raise a rhetorical storm blowing away everything and everybody. Indeed, when thinking of him, I never am sure what impressed me most, his scholarship or his personality. He was a truly wonderful man.

Kossmann became member of the Royal Netherlands Academy of Arts and Sciences in 1961 and resigned in 1966. He joined again as member in 1973.

== Bibliography (selection) ==
- La Fronde (doctoral thesis). Leiden: Universitaire Pers, 1954 (In French)
- In Praise of the Dutch Republic. Some seventeenth-century attitudes (inaugural lecture University College London). London: Lewis 1963
- The Low Countries: 1780-1940 (Oxford History of Modern Europe). Oxford: Clarendon Press, 1978, 790 pp.
- The Low Countries. History of the Southern and Northern Netherlands. Rekkem: Flemish-Netherlands Foundation Ons Erfdeel, 1987 (written by Dr. E.H. Kossmannn and Dr. J.A. Kossmann-Putto)
- Political thought in the Dutch Republic. Three Studies. Amsterdam: KNAW, 2000
- Over conservatisme [On Conservatism], Amsterdam: Athenaeum Polak & Van Gennep, 1981 (Huizinga Lecture of 1980)

== Sources ==
- H.L. Wesseling, 'Ernst Heinrich Kossmann, Leiden 31 januari 1922 - Groningen 8 november 2003', Jaarboek van de Maatschappij der Nederlandse Letterkunde 2004, p. 106-125 (in Dutch).
- File Ernst Kossmann in the Digital Library of Dutch Literature (DBNL), including online versions of some of his books.
