= J. H. Leopold =

Dutch poet and classicist (1865–1925)

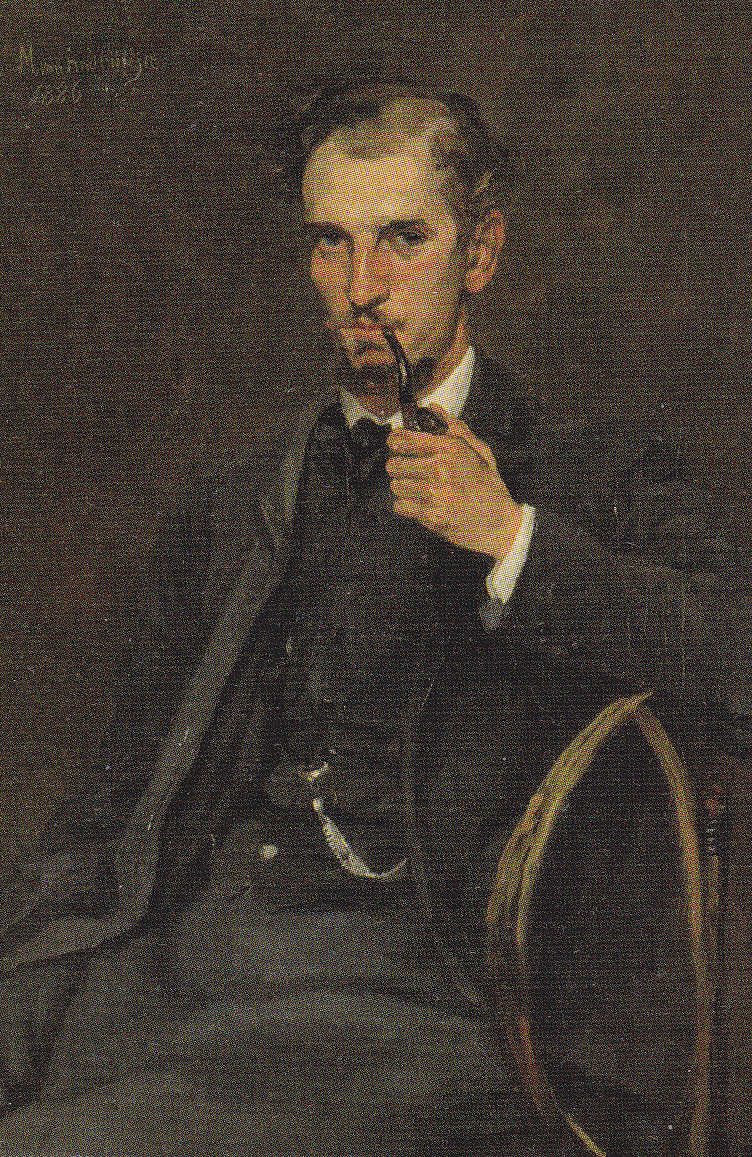
By Martin van Andringa, 1888

Jan Hendrik Leopold (May 11, 1865 – June 21, 1925) was a Dutch poet and classicist.

Leopold was born at 's-Hertogenbosch, Netherlands. After living in Arnhem he moved to Rotterdam early in 1892, where he became a teacher of classical languages at the Gymnasium Erasmianum. He translated portions of The Rubaiyat of Omar Khayyam into Dutch. In a more modern vein, his deafness undoubtedly contributed to the melancholic tone of much of his Symbolist work of the literary Dutch Renaissance. Having thus described his life as "one long plaint", he died in Rotterdam. His on-campus cenotaph includes his portrait and one of his poems.

== Works ==
- Studia Peerlkampiana (1892)
- Ad Spinozae opera posthuma (1902)
- Stoïsche wijsheid (1904)
- M. Antonius Imperator (1908)
- Uit den tuin van Epicurus (1910)
- Verzen (1912)
- Cheops (1916)
- Oostersch (1924)
- Verzen II (1926)

== Gallery ==
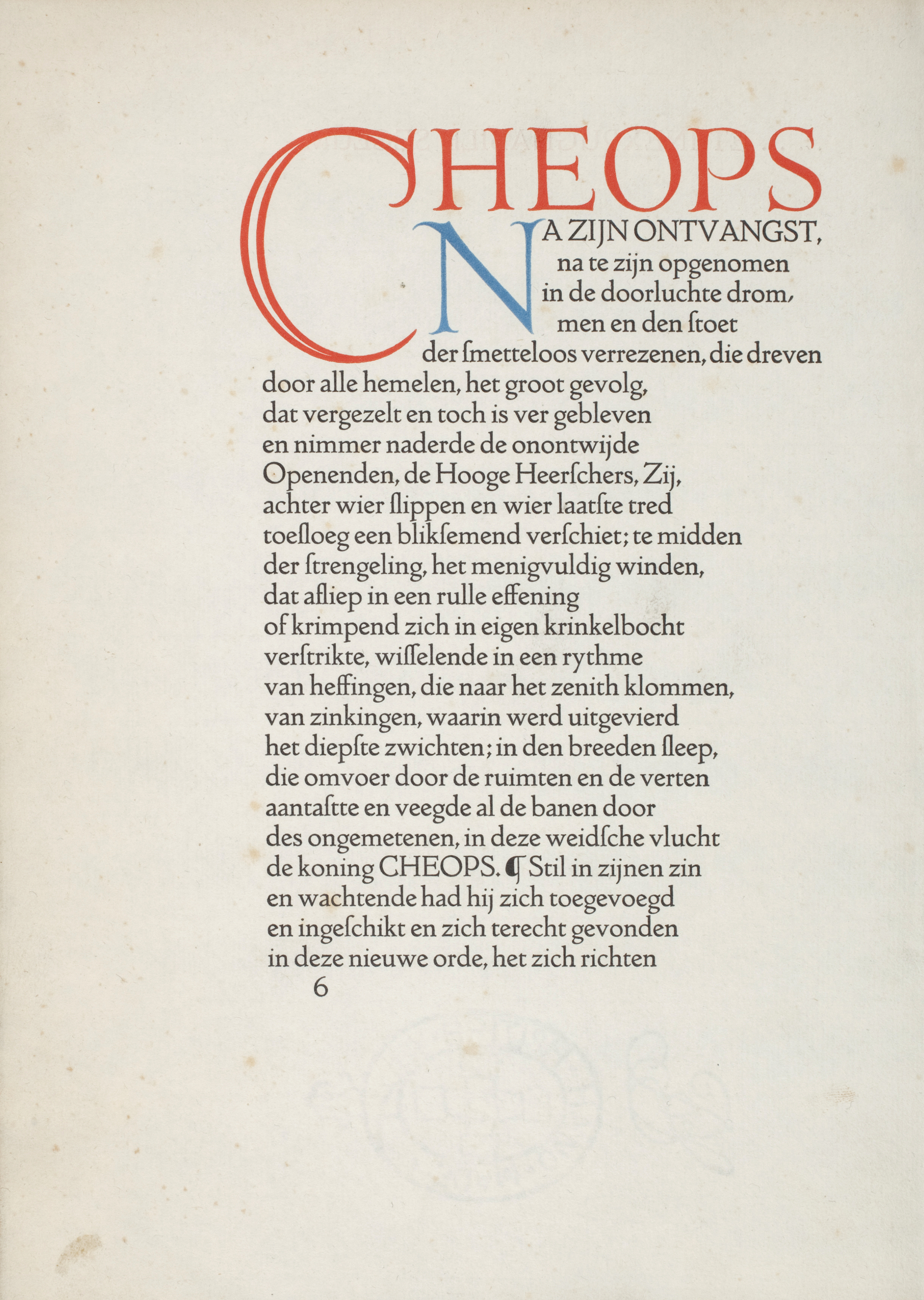
Cheops

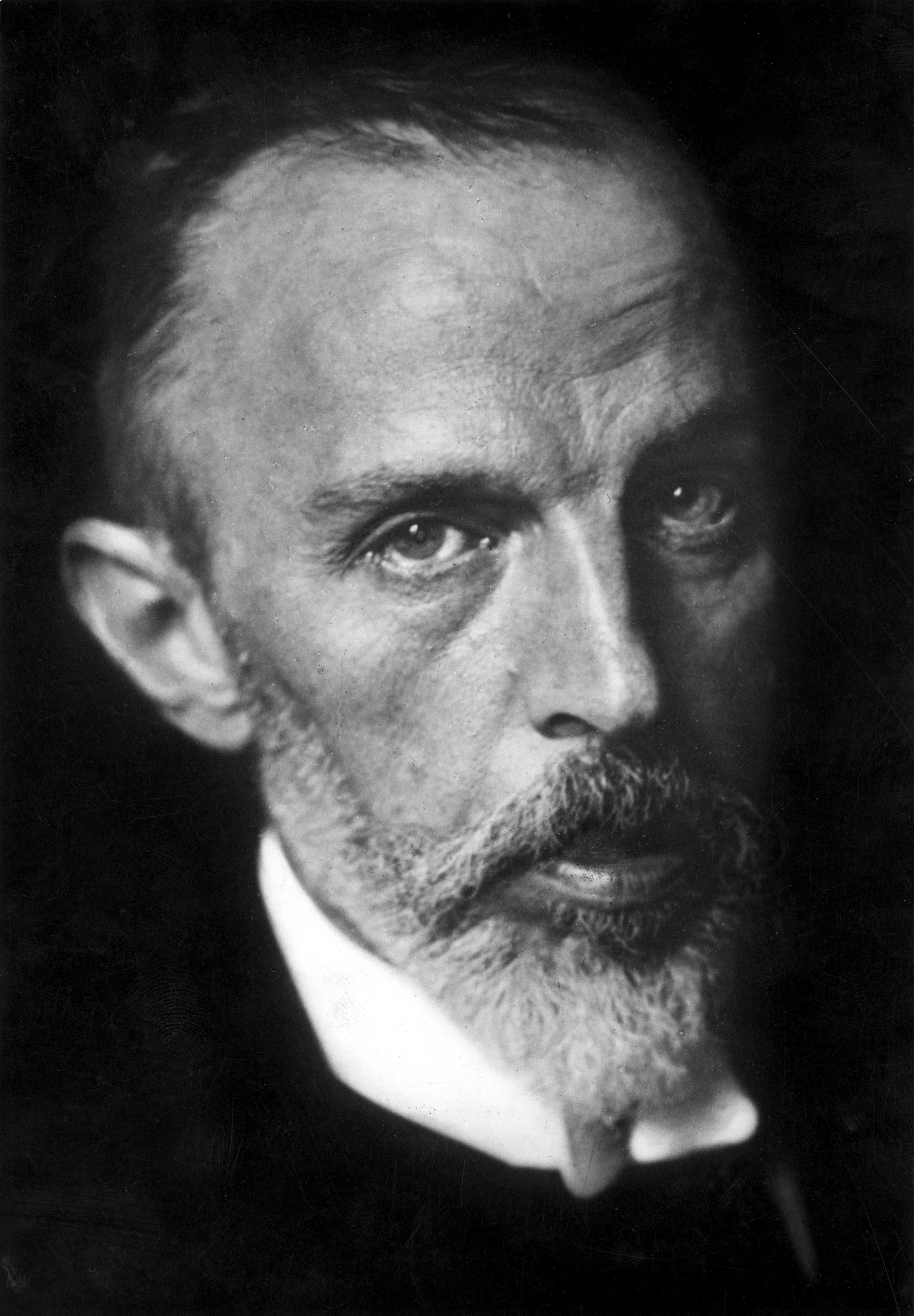
1913 photograph by Henri Berssenbrugge

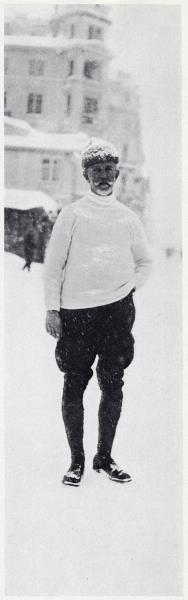
Pontresina, Switzerland, 1920

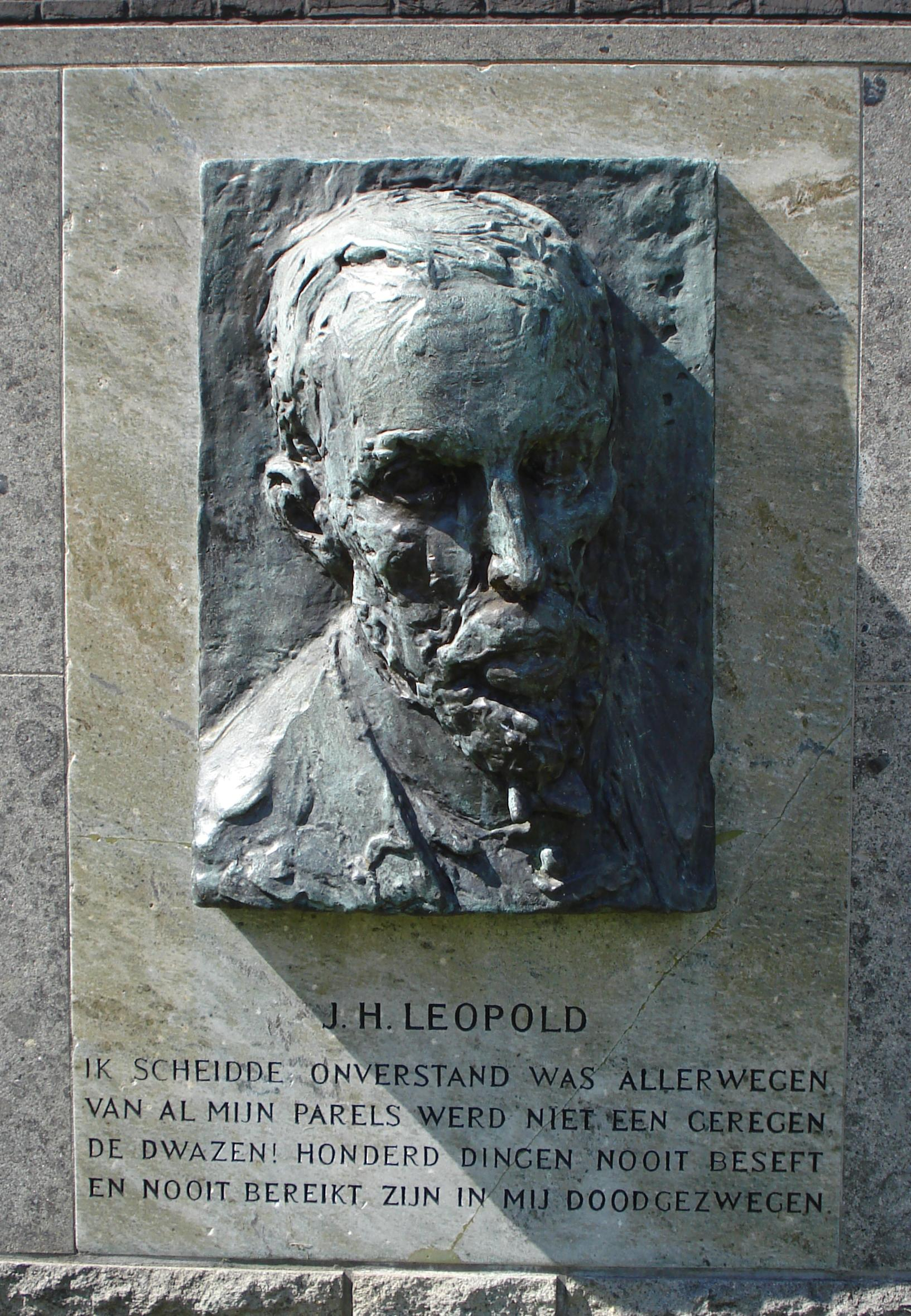
Cenotaph, by Charlotte van Pallandt
