= Bogor Zoology Museum =

Indonesian institution

- Museum Zoologi Bogor
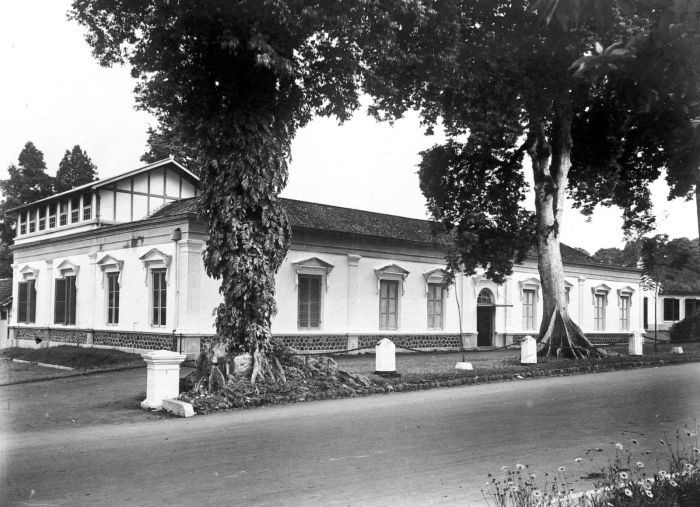
- Bogor Zoological Museum in 1920
- Established: Laboratory 1894
- Location: Jalan Ir. H. Djuanda Blok Pengairan No.9, Bogor
- Coordinates: 6°36′13″S 106°47′49″E
- Type: zoology
- Collection size: Vast collection of fossilized and preserved faunas.
- Owner: Indonesian Institute of Sciences

Bogor Zoology Museum (Indonesian, Museum Zoologi Bogor or Museum Zoologicum Bogoriense, often abbreviated to MZB) is a museum located next to the main entrance of the Bogor Botanical Gardens in the city of Bogor, Indonesia. The museum and its laboratory were founded in 1894 by government of Dutch East Indies during the colonial era. It contain one of the largest collections of preserved fauna specimens in southeast Asia.

== History ==
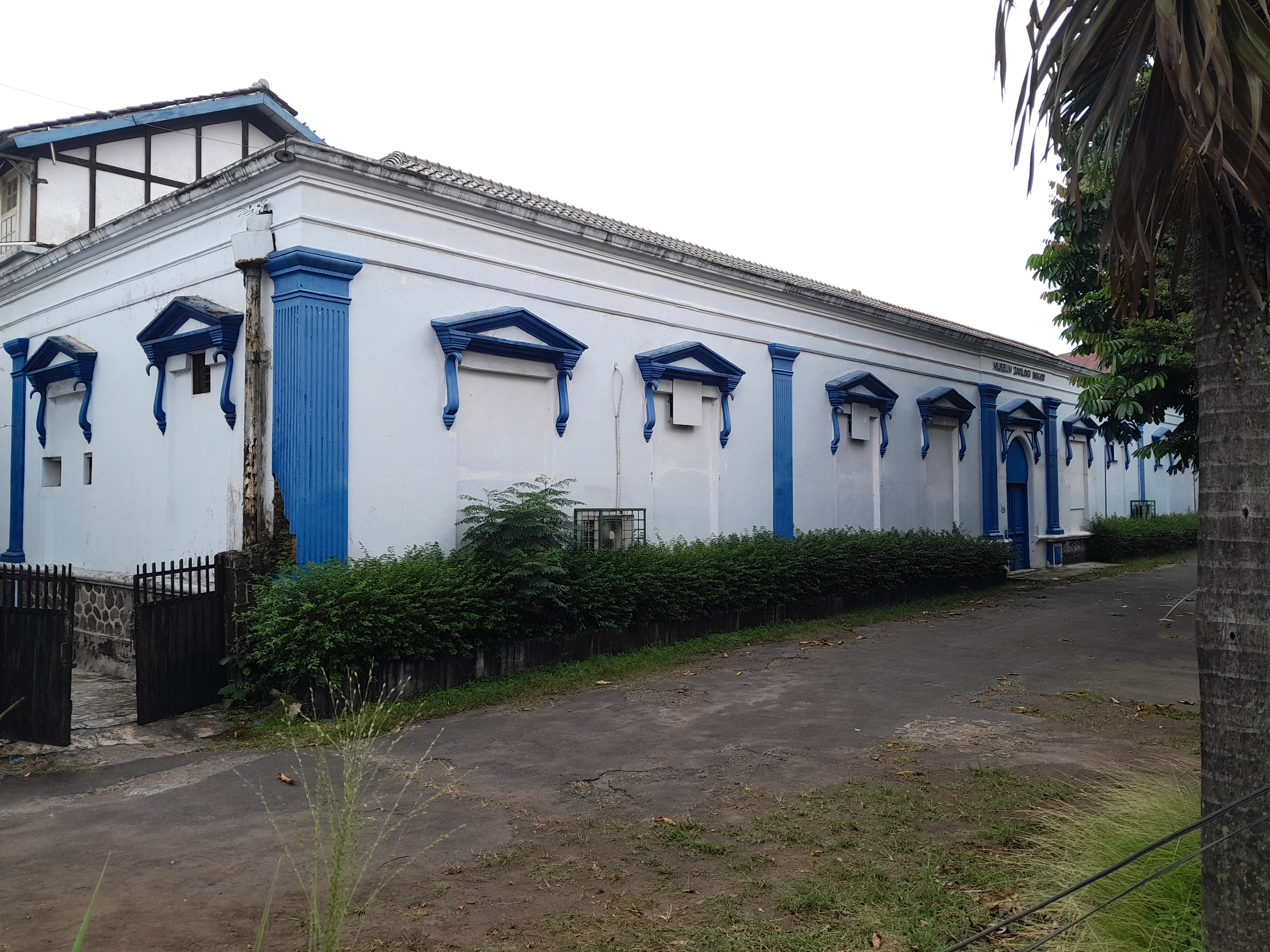
Part of the original front facade of the building, which is now barred to the public.

Bogor Zoology Museum was founded by Dr. J.C. Koningsberger in August 1894, and was originally just a small laboratory at the corner of the Bogor Botanical Garden (formerly known as 's Lands Plantentuin). The first laboratory was known as Landbouw-zoölogisch Laboratorium (Agriculture and Zoological Laboratory), which focussed on insect pests in plants.

Inspired by his visit to Sri Lanka in 1898, J. Koningsberger went to collect animal specimens for research with assistance of Dr Melchior Treub. At the end of August 1901, a building was completed to house the zoological museum, to be known as Zoölogisch Museum en Werkplaats. In 1906 the museum and the laboratory were combined, and renamed Zoölogisch Museum en Laboratorium. In 1912 at the museum, Peter Ouwens wrote the first scientific description of Komodo dragon. The museum has been known by its current name since Indonesia gained its independence in 1950.

Since changing its name to the Balai Penelitian dan Pengembangan Zoologi (Zoological Research and Development Centre) in 1987, this institution, under the auspices of the Pusat Penelitian dan Pengembangan Biologi, Lembaga Ilmu Pengetahuan Indonesia (Center for Biological Research and Development, Indonesian Institute of Sciences), has developed its activities not only as a museum involved in the field of taxonomy, but also carries out research and development in the field of ecology. and fauna physiology. The collection currently held by the museum was enhanced in 1997 using grants from the World Bank and the Japanese government.

== Collection ==
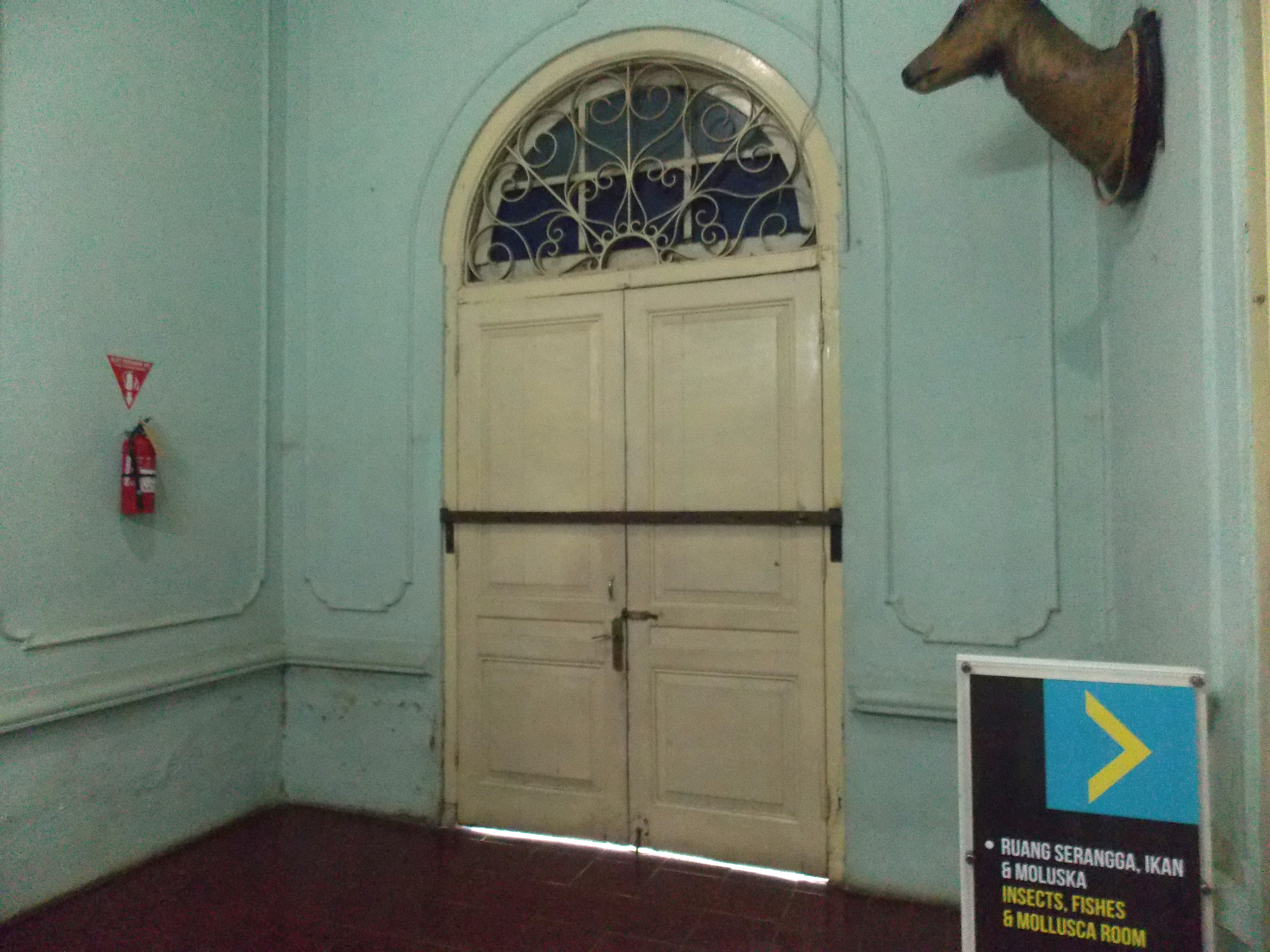
An example of Rijksstijl ornamentation preserved as a part of the building.

The Bogor Zoological Museum has an area of 1,500 m^{2} (16,000 ft^{2}), and contains one of the most extensive fauna collections in Southeast Asia. There are 24 rooms in the museum, which are maintained at a constant temperature of 22 °C (72 °F) to help protect the exhibits in its collection.

The museum collection includes fossilised and preserved animals:

- Mammals – 650 species and 30,000 specimens, including a rare mounted specimen of a Javan rhinoceros (Rhinoceros sondaicus)
- Birds – 1000 species and 30,762 specimens
- Reptiles and amphibians – 763 species and 19,937 specimens
- Insects – 12000 species and 2,580,000 specimens
- Molluscs – 959 species and 13,146 specimens
- Other invertebrates – 700 species and 15,558 specimens

There is also a skeleton of a blue whale (Balaenoptera musculus), the biggest of its kind in Indonesia.
