= Henri Berssenbrugge =

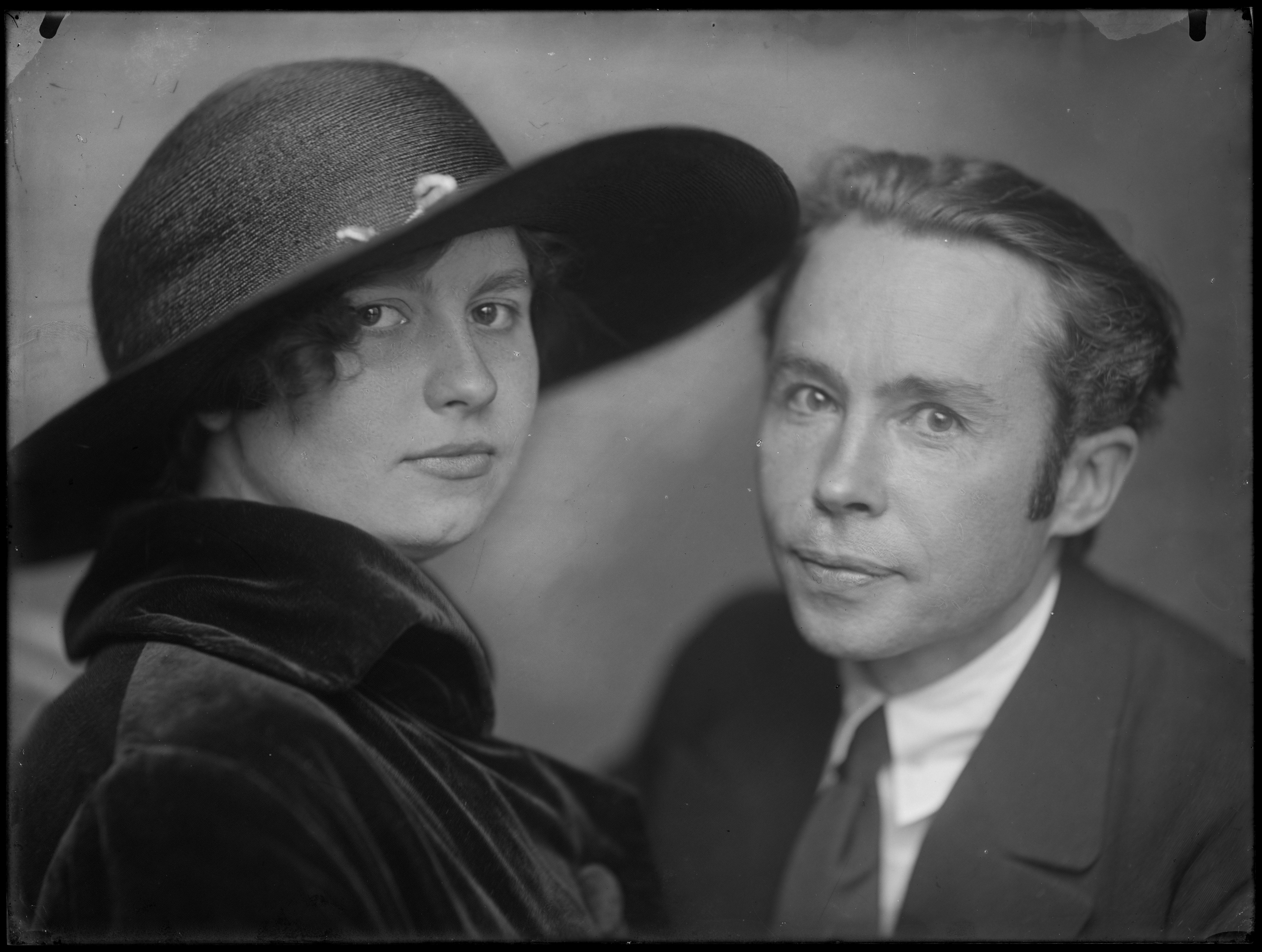
Ursulina Cornelia (Corry) Alban & Henri Berssenbrugge, by Jacob Merkelbach

Bernard Heinrich Wilhelm (Henri) Berssenbrugge (13 March 1873 in Rotterdam – 4 May 1959 in Goirle) was a major Dutch photographer.
