= Jan Maarten Bremer =

Dutch classical scholar (1932–2023)

- Born: Jan Maarten Bremer; 8 October 1932; Wijk bij Duurstede, Netherlands
- Died: 3 September 2023 (aged 90); Castricum, Netherlands
- Occupation: Professor of Ancient Greek

Academic background
- Education: University of Nijmegen; University of Amsterdam; Jesus College, Cambridge
- Thesis: Hamartia: Tragic Error in the Poetics of Aristotle and in Greek Tragedy (1969)
- Doctoral advisor: Jan Coenraad Kamerbeek

Academic work
- Discipline: Classics
- Sub-discipline: Ancient Greek literature
- Institutions: University of Amsterdam
- Doctoral students: Irene de Jong

Jan Maarten Bremer (8 October 1932 – 3 September 2023) was a Dutch classical scholar, known for his work on ancient Greek literature.

== Biography ==
Bremer was born on 8 October 1932 at Wijk bij Duurstede. He obtained degrees at the University of Nijmegen and the University of Amsterdam, and studied at Jesus College, Cambridge from 1965 to 1967, where he worked with Denys Page and D. W. Lucas. He obtained his doctorate at Amsterdam in 1969, with a thesis titled "Hamartia: Tragic Error in the Poetics of Aristotle and in Greek Tragedy", written under the supervision of Jan Coenraad Kamerbeek.

In 1976, Bremer was appointed to the Chair of Ancient Greek at the University of Amsterdam, following the retirement of Kamerbeek. Bremer's doctoral students at Amsterdam included Irene de Jong.

His retirement in 1995 was marked by a Festschrift in his honour, titled Schurken en schelmen. Cultuurhistorische verkenningen rond de Middellandse zee ("Rogues and Scoundrels: Cultural-Historical Explorations around the Mediterranean"). In 2006, he was appointed an Officer of the Order of Orange-Nassau.

He died at Castricum on 3 September 2023.

== Selected publications ==
=== Monographs ===
- Bremer, Jan Maarten (1968). Hamartia: Tragic Error in the Poetics of Aristotle and in Greek Tragedy. Hakkert.
- Mastronarde, Donald J.; Bremer, J. M. (1982). The Textual Tradition of Euripides' Phoinissai. University of California Publications in Classical Studies. ISBN 9780520096646.

=== Editions of ancient texts ===
- Bremer, Jan Maarten; van Erp Taalman Kip, A. M.; Slings, S. (1987). Some Recently Found Greek Poems. Brill. ISBN 9789004083196.
- Furley, William D.; Bremer, Jan Maarten (2001). Greek Hymns: Selected Cult Songs from the Archaic to the Hellenistic Period. Mohr Siebeck. Two volumes. ISBN 9783161476761; ISBN 9783161475542.

=== Edited volumes ===
- Bremer, Jan Maarten; Radt, S. L.; Ruijgh, C. J., eds. (1976). Miscellanea tragica in honorem J. C. Kamerbeek. Hakkert. ISBN 9789025607890.
- Bremer, Jan Maarten; de Jong, Irene; Kalff, J., eds. (1987). Homer: Beyond Oral Poetry. Grüner.
- Bremer, Jan Maarten; Handley, E. W., eds. (1993). Aristophane: sept exposés suivis de discussions. Fondation Hardt.
- Bremer, Jan Maarten; van den Hout, Theo; Peters, R., eds. (1994). Hidden Futures: Death and Immortality in Ancient Egypt, Anatolia, the Classical, Biblical and Arabic-Islamic World. Amsterdam University Press. ISBN 9789053560785.
- Bremer, Jan Maarten; Czachesz, István, eds. (2003). The Apocalypse of Peter. Peeters. ISBN 9789042913752.
