= List of cabinets of the Netherlands =

The following is a list of cabinets of the Netherlands.

== List ==
Cabinet	Prime Minister	Term of office		Demissionary	Time in office	Parties	Political position	Orientation	Legislature Status	Type	Election
Schimmelpenninck Curtius											
De Kempenaer-Donker Curtius											
Thorbecke I											
Van Hall-Donker Curtius											
Van Hall-Donker Curtius											
Van der Brugghen											
Rochussen											
Van Hall-Van Heemstra											
Van Zuylen van Nijevelt-Van Heemstra											
Thorbecke II											
Thorbecke II											
Fransen van de Putte											
Van Zuylen van Nijevelt											
Van Bosse-Fock											
Thorbecke III											
De Vries-Fransen van de Putte											
Heemskerk-Van Lynden van Sandenburg											
Heemskerk-Van Lynden van Sandenburg											
Kappeyne van de Coppello	Jan Kappeyne van de Coppello	3 November 1877	20 August 1879	11 July 1879	1 year, 290 days	^{[IL]}	Centre-right	Liberal	Majority	Conventional	1877
Van Lynden van Sandenburg	Theo van Lynden van Sandenburg	20 August 1879	23 April 1883	1 March 1883	3 years, 246 days	^{[ICO]} • ^{[IL]} • ^{[ICA]}^{[IP]}	Right-wing	Christian Democratic–Liberal	Minority	Confidence and supply	1879
J. Heemskerk	Jan Heemskerk	23 April 1883	21 April 1888	30 March 1888	4 years, 364 days	^{[ICO]} • ^{[IL]} • ^{[ICA]}	Right-wing	Liberal	Minority	Confidence and supply	1883
Mackay	Aeneas Mackay	21 April 1888	21 August 1891	9 July 1891	3 years, 122 days	ARP • ^{[ICA]} • ^{[IP]}	Centre-right	Christian Democratic	Minority	Confidence and supply	1888
Van Tienhoven	Gijsbert van Tienhoven	21 August 1891	9 May 1894	24 April 1894	2 years, 261 days	LU • ^{[IL]}	Right-wing	Liberal	Majority	Conventional	1891
Röell	Joan Röell	9 May 1894	27 July 1897	28 June 1897	3 years, 79 days	^{[IL]} (LU • ^{[ICA]})	Right-wing	Liberal	Minority	Confidence and supply	1894
Pierson	Nicolaas Pierson	27 July 1897	1 August 1901	28 June 1901	4 years, 5 days	LU^{[IL]}	Left-liberal	Liberal	Minority	Confidence and supply	1897
Kuyper	Abraham Kuyper	1 August 1901	17 August 1905	3 July 1905	4 years, 16 days	^{[ICA]} • ARP (1901–1904)	Centre-right	Christian Democratic	Minority	Conventional	1901
Kuyper	Abraham Kuyper	1 August 1901	17 August 1905	3 July 1905	4 years, 16 days	ABRK • ARP (1904–1905)	Centre-right	Christian Democratic	Minority	Conventional	1901
De Meester	Theo de Meester	17 August 1905	12 February 1908	21 December 1907	2 years, 179 days	LU • VDB^{[IL]}	Left-wing	Liberal	Minority	Confidence and supply	1905
T. Heemskerk	Theo Heemskerk	12 February 1908	29 August 1913	26 June 1913	5 years, 198 days	ARP • ABRK (Ind. Cat. • Ind. Prot.) (1908–1909)	Centre-right	Christian Democratic	Minority	Confidence and supply	-
T. Heemskerk	Theo Heemskerk	12 February 1908	29 August 1913	26 June 1913	5 years, 198 days	ARP • ABRK (1909–1913)	Centre-right	Christian Democratic	Majority	Conventional	1909
Cort van der Linden	Pieter Cort van der Linden	29 August 1913	9 September 1918	2 July 1918	5 years, 11 days	^{[IL]} (LU • CHU • VDB; EL)	Left-liberal	Liberal	Minority	Confidence and supply	1913
Ruijs de Beerenbrouck I	Charles Ruijs de Beerenbrouck	9 September 1918	18 September 1922	18 July 1922	4 years, 9 days	RKSP • ARP • CHU	Centre-right	Christian Democratic	Majority	Conventional	1918
Ruijs de Beerenbrouck II	Charles Ruijs de Beerenbrouck	18 September 1922	4 August 1925	1 July 1925	2 years, 320 days	RKSP • ARP • CHU	Centre-right	Christian Democratic	Majority	Conventional	1922
Colijn I	Hendrikus Colijn	4 August 1925	8 March 1926	11 November 1925	216 days	RKSP • ARP • CHU	Centre-right	Christian Democratic	Majority	Conventional	1925
De Geer I	Dirk Jan de Geer	8 March 1926	10 August 1929	3 July 1929	3 years, 155 days	RKSP • ARP • CHU	Centre-right	Christian Democratic	Majority	Conventional	-
Ruijs de Beerenbrouck III	Charles Ruijs de Beerenbrouck	10 August 1929	26 May 1933	15 May 1933	3 years, 289 days	RKSP • ARP • CHU	Centre-right	Christian Democratic	Majority	Conventional	1929
Colijn II	Hendrikus Colijn	26 May 1933	31 July 1935	23 July 1935	2 years, 66 days	RKSP • ARP • CHU; LSP • VDB	Centre-right	Christian Democratic–Liberal	Majority	Conventional	1933
Colijn III	Hendrikus Colijn	31 July 1935	24 June 1937	25 May 1937	1 year, 328 days	RKSP • ARP • CHU; LSP • VDB	Centre-right	Christian Democratic–Liberal	Majority	Conventional	-
Colijn IV	Hendrikus Colijn	24 June 1937	25 July 1939	29 June 1939	2 years, 31 days	RKSP • ARP • CHU	Centre-right	Christian Democratic	Majority	Conventional	1937
Colijn V	Hendrikus Colijn	25 July 1939	10 August 1939	27 July 1939	16 days	ARP • CHU • LSP	Right-wing	Christian Democratic–Liberal	Minority	Caretaker	-
De Geer II (London I)	Dirk Jan de Geer	10 August 1939	3 September 1940	26 August 1940	1 year, 24 days	RKSP • SDAP • ARP; CHU • VDB	Centre		Majority	National unity (War cabinet)	-
Gerbrandy I (London II)	Pieter Sjoerds; Gerbrandy	3 September 1940	27 July 1941	1 July 1941	327 days	RKSP • SDAP • ARP; CHU • VDB • LSP	Centrist		Majority	National unity (War cabinet)	-
Gerbrandy II (London III)	Pieter Sjoerds; Gerbrandy	27 July 1941	23 February 1945	21 January 1945	3 years, 211 days	RKSP • SDAP • ARP; CHU • VDB • LSP	Centrist		Majority	National unity (War cabinet)	-
Gerbrandy III (London IV)	Pieter Sjoerds; Gerbrandy	23 February 1945	25 June 1945	12 May 1945	122 days	RKSP • ARP • VDB	Centrist		Minority	National unity (War cabinet)	-
Schermerhorn–Drees	Willem Schermerhorn	25 June 1945	3 July 1946	16 May 1946	1 year, 8 days	RKSP • SDAP • VDB (ARP • CHU) (1945–1946)	Centre-left	Christian Democratic– Social Democratic; Liberal (Roman/Red)	Majority	National unity (Confidence and supply)	-
Schermerhorn–Drees	Willem Schermerhorn	25 June 1945	3 July 1946	16 May 1946	1 year, 8 days	KVP • PvdA (ARP • CHU) (1946)	Centre-left	Christian Democratic– Social Democratic; Liberal (Roman/Red)	Majority	National unity (Confidence and supply)	-
Beel I	Louis Beel	3 July 1946	7 August 1948	7 July 1948	2 years, 35 days	KVP • PvdA	Centre-left	Christian Democratic– Social Democratic (Roman/Red)	Majority	Grand coalition	1946
Drees–Van Schaik (Drees I)	Willem Drees	7 August 1948	15 March 1951	24 January 1951	2 years, 220 days	KVP • PvdA; CHU • VVD	Centre-left	• Christian Democratic • Social Democratic • Conservative Liberal (Roman/Red)	Majority	Grand coalition	1948
Drees I (Drees II)	Willem Drees	15 March 1951	2 September 1952	25 June 1952	1 year, 171 days	KVP • PvdA; CHU • VVD	Centre-left	• Christian Democratic • Social Democratic • Conservative Liberal (Roman/Red)	Majority	Grand coalition	-
Drees II (Drees III)	Willem Drees	2 September 1952	13 October 1956	13 June 1956	4 years, 41 days	PvdA • KVP; ARP • CHU	Centre-left	• Social Democratic • Christian Democratic (Roman/Red)	Majority	Grand coalition	1952
Drees III (Drees IV)	Willem Drees	13 October 1956	22 December 1958	11 December 1958	2 years, 70 days	PvdA • KVP; ARP • CHU	Centre-left	• Social Democratic • Christian Democratic (Roman/Red)	Majority	Grand coalition	1956
Beel II	Louis Beel	22 December 1958	19 May 1959	12 March 1959	148 days	KVP • ARP; CHU	Centre-right	• Christian Democratic	Majority	Caretaker	-
De Quay	Jan de Quay	19 May 1959	24 July 1963	15 May 1963	4 years, 66 days	KVP • VVD; ARP • CHU	Centre-right	• Christian Democratic • Conservative Liberal	Majority	Conventional	1959
Marijnen	Victor Marijnen	24 July 1963	14 April 1965	27 February 1965	1 year, 264 days	KVP • VVD; ARP • CHU	Centre-right	• Christian Democratic • Conservative Liberal	Majority	Conventional	1963
Cals	Jo Cals	14 April 1965	22 November 1966	14 October 1966	1 year, 222 days	KVP • PvdA; ARP	Centre-left	• Christian Democratic • Social Democratic	Majority	Conventional	-
Zijlstra	Jelle Zijlstra	22 November 1966	5 April 1967	15 February 1967	134 days	KVP • ARP	Centre-right	Christian Democratic	Minority	Caretaker	-
De Jong	Piet de Jong	5 April 1967	6 July 1971	28 April 1971	4 years, 92 days	KVP • VVD; ARP • CHU	Centre-right	• Christian Democratic • Conservative Liberal	Majority	Conventional	1967
Biesheuvel I	Barend Biesheuvel	6 July 1971	9 August 1972	19 July 1972	1 year, 34 days	KVP • VVD; ARP • CHU; DS'70	Centre-right	• Christian Democratic • Conservative Liberal • Social Democratic	Majority	Conventional	1971
Biesheuvel II	Barend Biesheuvel	9 August 1972	11 May 1973	29 November 1972	275 days	KVP • VVD; ARP • CHU	Centre-right	• Christian Democratic • Conservative Liberal	Minority	Caretaker	-
Den Uyl	Joop den Uyl	11 May 1973	19 December 1977	22 March 1977	4 years, 222 days	PvdA • KVP; ARP • PPR; D'66	Centre-left	• Social Democratic • Christian Democratic • Green • Social Liberal	Majority	Conventional	1972
Van Agt I (Van Agt–Wiegel)	Dries van Agt	19 December 1977	11 September 1981	26 May 1981	3 years, 266 days	KVP • VVD; ARP • CHU (1977–1980)	Centre-right	• Christian Democratic • Conservative Liberal	Majority	Conventional	1977
Van Agt I (Van Agt–Wiegel)	Dries van Agt	19 December 1977	11 September 1981	26 May 1981	3 years, 266 days	CDA • VVD (1980–1981)	Centre-right	• Christian Democratic • Conservative Liberal	Majority	Conventional	1977
Van Agt II	Dries van Agt	11 September 1981	29 May 1982	12 May 1982	260 days	CDA • PvdA; D'66	Centre-left	• Christian Democratic • Social Democratic • Social Liberal	Majority	Grand coalition	1981
Van Agt III	Dries van Agt	29 May 1982	4 November 1982	8 September 1982	159 days	CDA • D'66	Centre-right	• Christian Democratic • Social Liberal	Minority	Caretaker	-
Lubbers I	Ruud Lubbers	4 November 1982	14 July 1986	22 May 1986	3 years, 252 days	CDA • VVD	Centre-right	• Christian Democratic • Conservative Liberal	Majority	Conventional	1982
Lubbers II	Ruud Lubbers	14 July 1986	7 November 1989	3 May 1989	3 years, 116 days	CDA • VVD	Centre-right	• Christian Democratic • Conservative Liberal	Majority	Conventional	1986
Lubbers III (Lubbers–Kok)	Ruud Lubbers	7 November 1989	22 August 1994	10 May 1994	4 years, 288 days	CDA • PvdA	Centrist	• Christian Democratic • Social Democratic	Majority	Grand coalition	1989
Kok I (Purple I)	Wim Kok	22 August 1994	3 August 1998	6 May 1998	3 years, 346 days	PvdA • VVD; D66	Centrist	• Social Democratic • Conservative Liberal • Social Liberal (Purple)	Majority	Grand coalition	1994
Kok II (Purple II)	Wim Kok	3 August 1998	22 July 2002	16 April 2002	3 years, 353 days	PvdA • VVD; D66	Centrist	• Social Democratic • Conservative Liberal • Social Liberal (Purple)	Majority	Grand coalition	1998
Balkenende I	Jan Peter Balkenende	22 June 2002	27 May 2003	16 October 2002	339 days	CDA • LPF; VVD	Right-wing	• Christian Democratic • Nationalist • Conservative Liberal	Majority	Conventional	2002
Balkenende II	Jan Peter Balkenende	27 May 2003	7 July 2006	30 June 2006	3 years, 41 days	CDA • VVD; D66	Centre-right	• Christian Democratic • Conservative Liberal • Social Liberal	Majority	Conventional	2003
Balkenende III	Jan Peter Balkenende	7 July 2006	22 February 2007	22 November 2006	230 days	CDA • VVD	Centre-right	• Christian Democratic • Conservative Liberal	Minority	Caretaker	-
Balkenende IV	Jan Peter Balkenende	22 February 2007	14 October 2010	20 February 2010	3 years, 234 days	CDA • PvdA; CU	Centrist	• Christian Democratic • Social Democratic	Majority	Grand coalition	2006
Rutte I (Rutte–Verhagen)	Mark Rutte	14 October 2010	5 November 2012	23 April 2012	2 years, 22 days	VVD • CDA (PVV)	Right-wing	• Conservative Liberal • Christian Democratic (Nationalist)	Minority	Confidence and supply	2010
Rutte II (Rutte–Asscher)	Mark Rutte	5 November 2012	26 October 2017	14 March 2017	4 years, 355 days	VVD • PvdA	Centrist	• Conservative Liberal • Social Democratic (Purple)	Majority	Grand coalition	2012
Rutte III	Mark Rutte	26 October 2017	10 January 2022	15 January 2021	4 years, 76 days	VVD • CDA; D66 • CU	Centre-right	• Conservative Liberal • Christian Democratic • Social Liberal	Majority	Conventional	2017
Rutte IV	Mark Rutte	10 January 2022	2 July 2024	7 July 2023	2 years, 174 days	VVD • CDA; D66 • CU	Centre-right	• Conservative Liberal • Christian Democratic • Social Liberal	Majority	Conventional	2021
Schoof	Dick Schoof	2 July 2024	23 February 2026	3 June 2025	1 year, 236 days	PVV • VVD; NSC • BBB	Right-wing	• Nationalist • Conservative Liberal • Christian Democratic • Agrarianist	Majority	Conventional	2023
Jetten	Rob Jetten	23 February 2026	Incumbent		3 days	D66 • VVD • CDA	Centre-right	• Social Liberal • Conservative Liberal • Christian Democratic	Minority	Conventional	2025

^{Independent Liberals}
^{Independent Conservatives}
^{Independent Christian Democratic Catholics}
^{Independent Christian Democratic Protestants}
