= List of prime ministers of the Netherlands =

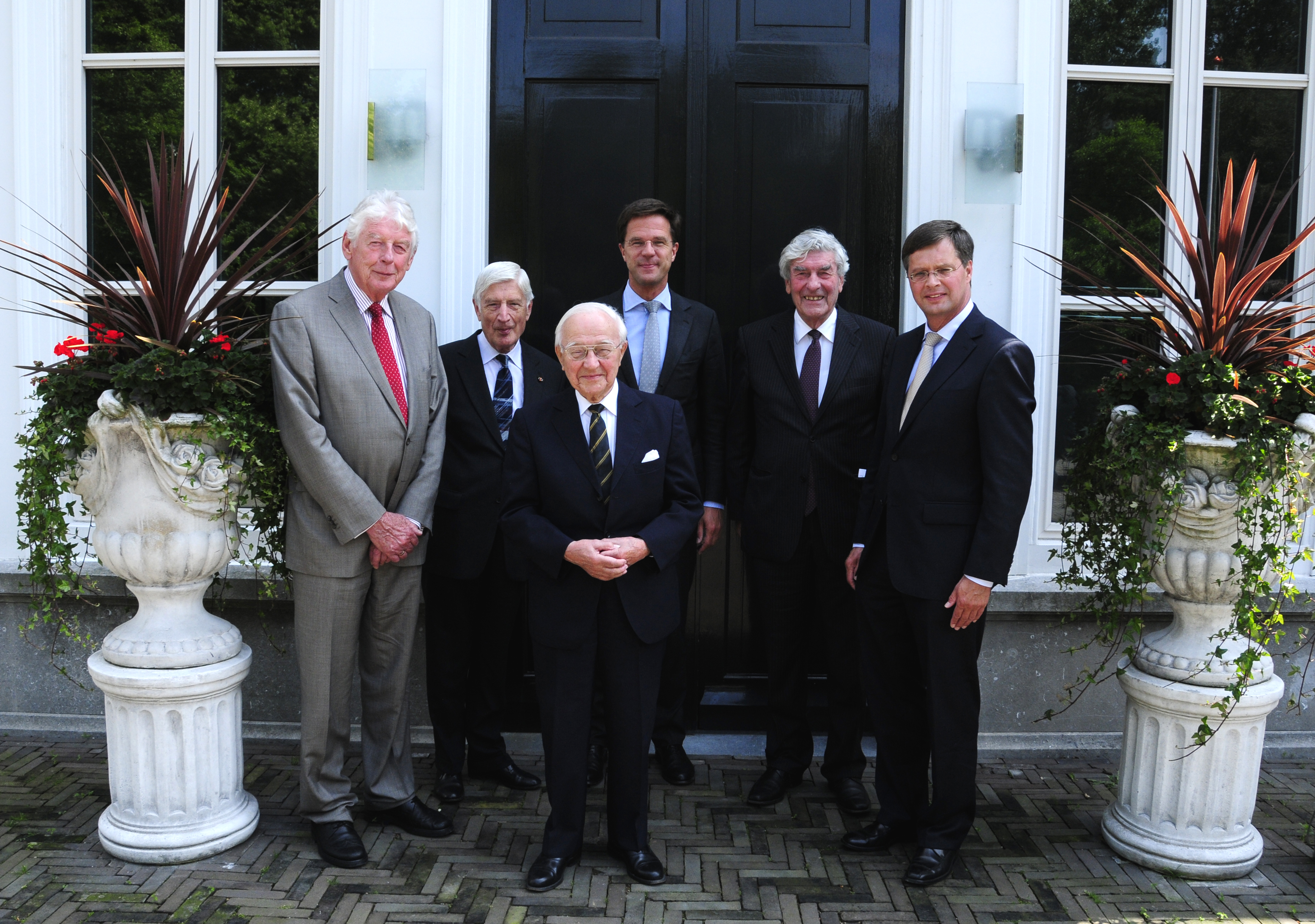
Five former officeholders (Wim Kok, Dries van Agt, Piet de Jong, Ruud Lubbers and Jan Peter Balkenende) with then Prime Minister Mark Rutte, in July 2011

The office of prime ministers of the Netherlands has existed since 1945, but the term has been retroactively applied to informal leaders of cabinets or chairmen of the Council of Ministers since 1848. The role is sometimes also referred to as premier.

From its inception in 1823, the Council of Ministers was chaired by the vice-president of the Council of State, while a referendary of the Council of State served as its secretary. This changed in the 1842, when the chairmanship started rotating among the ministers, while the secretariat was transferred to the director of the King's Office. After this latter functionary was removed from the Council of Ministers in 1862, the secretariat rotated among the ministers alongside the chairmanship. After 1880, ministers could refuse their term as chairman, which led to a permanent chairmanship in practice.

Abraham Kuyper (1901-1905) is generally seen as the starting point of the prime ministership, because he amended the rules of the Council so he would be chairman for the entire term. This was formally reverted after his term, but the practice remained. In 1922, the rules of the Council were amended so the chairmanship was no longer formally temporary. After the World War II in 1945, the term minister-president was used in the rules of the Council to refer to the chairman and in 1983 this title was formalised in the Constitution of the Netherlands.

The prime minister has also been head of the Ministry of General Affairs since its inception in 1937, with a break between 1940 and 1947.

== Cabinet leader (1848-1874) ==
Name (born and died)	Portrait	Term of office			Political affiliation	Election	Cabinet	Monarch (Reign)
Name (born and died)	Portrait	Took office	Left office	Tenure	Political affiliation	Election	Cabinet	Monarch (Reign)
Gerrit Schimmelpenninck (1794–1863)	Gerrit Schimmelpenninck	25 March 1848	17 May 1848	53 days	Independent Liberal	—	Schimmelpenninck; Conservative	Willem II (1840–1849)
Jacob de Kempenaer (1793–1870)	Jacob de Kempenaer	21 November 1848	1 November 1849	345 days	Independent Liberal	1848	De Kempenaer— Donker Curtius; Liberal	Willem II (1840–1849)
Jacob de Kempenaer (1793–1870)	Jacob de Kempenaer	21 November 1848	1 November 1849	345 days	Independent Liberal	1848	De Kempenaer— Donker Curtius; Liberal	Willem III (1849–1890)
Johan Rudolph Thorbecke (1798–1872)	Johan Rudolph Thorbecke	1 November 1849	19 April 1853	3 years, 169 days	Independent Liberal	1850; 1852	Thorbecke I Liberal	Willem III (1849–1890)
Floris Adriaan van Hall (1791–1866)	Floris Adriaan van Hall	19 April 1853	1 July 1856	3 years, 73 days	Independent Liberal	1853; 1854	Van Hall— Donker Curtius; Conservative	Willem III (1849–1890)
Justinus van der Brugghen (1804–1863)	Justinus van der Brugghen	1 July 1856	18 March 1858	1 year, 260 days	Independent Antirevolutionary	1856	Van der Brugghen; Conservative	Willem III (1849–1890)
Jan Jacob Rochussen (1797–1871)	Jan Jacob Rochussen	18 March 1858	23 February 1860	1 year, 342 days	Independent Conservative	1858	Rochussen; Liberal–Conservative	Willem III (1849–1890)
Floris Adriaan van Hall (1791–1866)	Floris Adriaan van Hall	23 February 1860	14 March 1861	1 year, 19 days	Independent Liberal	1860	Van Hall—Van Heemstra; Liberal–Conservative	Willem III (1849–1890)
Jacob van Zuylen van Nijevelt (1816–1890)	Jacob van Zuylen van Nijevelt	14 March 1861	10 November 1861	241 days	Independent Liberal	—	Van Zuylen van Nijevelt—Van Heemstra; Liberal–Conservative	Willem III (1849–1890)
Schelto van Heemstra (1807–1864)	Schelto van Heemstra	10 November 1861	1 February 1862	83 days	Independent Liberal	—	Van Zuylen van Nijevelt—Van Heemstra; Liberal–Conservative	Willem III (1849–1890)
Johan Rudolph Thorbecke (1798–1872)	Johan Rudolph Thorbecke	1 February 1862	10 February 1866	4 years, 9 days	Independent Liberal	1862; 1864	Thorbecke II; Liberal	Willem III (1849–1890)
Isaäc Dignus Fransen van de Putte (1822–1902)	Isaäc Dignus Fransen van de Putte	10 February 1866	1 June 1866	111 days	Independent Liberal	—	Fransen van de Putte; Liberal	Willem III (1849–1890)
Julius van Zuylen van Nijevelt (1819–1894)	Julius van Zuylen van Nijevelt	1 June 1866	4 June 1868	2 years, 3 days	Independent Conservative	Jun. 1866; Oct. 1866	Van Zuylen van Nijevelt; Conservative	Willem III (1849–1890)
Pieter Philip van Bosse (1809–1879)	Pieter Philip van Bosse	4 June 1868	4 January 1871	2 years, 214 days	Independent Liberal	1868; 1869	Van Bosse-Fock cabinet Liberal	Willem III (1849–1890)
Johan Rudolph Thorbecke (1798–1872)	Johan Rudolph Thorbecke	4 January 1871	4 June 1872	1 year, 152 days	Independent Liberal	1871	Thorbecke III; Liberal	Willem III (1849–1890)
Gerrit de Vries (1818–1900)	Gerrit de Vries	4 June 1872	27 August 1874	2 years, 84 days	Independent Liberal	1873	De Vries-Fransen van de Putte; Liberal	Willem III (1849–1890)

== Chairman of the Council of Ministers (1874-1945) ==
Name (born and died)	Portrait	Term of office			Political affiliation	Election	Cabinet	Monarch (Reign)
Name (born and died)	Portrait	Took office	Left office	Tenure	Political affiliation	Election	Cabinet	Monarch (Reign)
Jan Heemskerk (1818–1897)	Jan Heemskerk	28 August 1874	1 November 1877	3 years, 68 days	Independent Conservative	1875	Heemskerk–Van Lynden van Sandenburg; Conservative	Willem III (1849–1890)
Jan Kappeyne van de Coppello (1822–1895)	Jan Kappeyne van de Coppello	4 November 1877	19 August 1879	1 year, 290 days	Independent Liberal	1877	Kappeyne van de Coppello; Liberal	Willem III (1849–1890)
Theo van Lynden van Sandenburg (1826–1885)	Theo van Lynden van Sandenburg	21 August 1879	22 April 1883	3 years, 246 days	Independent Antirevolutionary	1879; 1881	Van Lynden van Sandenburg; Conservative–Liberal	Willem III (1849–1890)
Jan Heemskerk (1818–1897)	Jan Heemskerk	24 April 1883	19 April 1888	4 years, 363 days	Independent Conservative	1883; 1884; 1886; 1887	J. Heemskerk; Conservative–Liberal	Willem III (1849–1890)
Aeneas Mackay Jr. (1838–1909)	Aeneas Mackay Jr.	22 April 1888	20 August 1891	3 years, 123 days	Anti-Revolutionary Party	1888	Mackay; Coalition	Willem III (1849–1890)
Aeneas Mackay Jr. (1838–1909)	Aeneas Mackay Jr.	22 April 1888	20 August 1891	3 years, 123 days	Anti-Revolutionary Party	1888	Mackay; Coalition	Wilhelmina (1890–1948)
Gijsbert van Tienhoven (1841–1914)	Gijsbert van Tienhoven	22 August 1891	20 March 1894	2 years, 261 days	Independent Liberal	1891	Van Tienhoven; Liberal	Wilhelmina (1890–1948)
Joan Röell (1844–1914)	Joan Röell	10 May 1894	26 July 1897	3 years, 79 days	Independent Liberal	1894	Röell; Liberal	Wilhelmina (1890–1948)
Nicolaas Pierson (1839–1909)	Nicolaas Pierson	28 July 1897	30 July 1901	4 years, 5 days	Liberal Union	1897	Pierson; Liberal	Wilhelmina (1890–1948)
Abraham Kuyper (1837–1920)	Abraham Kuyper	2 August 1901	15 August 1905	4 years, 16 days	Anti-Revolutionary Party	1901	Kuyper; Coalition	Wilhelmina (1890–1948)
Theo de Meester (1851–1919)	Theo de Meester	18 August 1905	11 February 1908	2 years, 179 days	Liberal Union	1905	De Meester; Liberal	Wilhelmina (1890–1948)
Theo Heemskerk (1852–1932)	Theo Heemskerk	13 February 1908	28 August 1913	5 years, 198 days	Anti-Revolutionary Party	1909	T. Heemskerk; Coalition	Wilhelmina (1890–1948)
Pieter Cort van der Linden (1846–1935)	Pieter Cort van der Linden	29 August 1913	9 September 1918	5 years, 11 days	Independent Liberal	1913; 1917	Cort van der Linden; Liberal	Wilhelmina (1890–1948)
Charles Ruijs de Beerenbrouck (1873–1936)	Charles Ruijs de Beerenbrouck	9 September 1918	4 August 1925	6 years, 329 days	General League of Roman Catholic Electoral Associations	1918	Ruijs de Beerenbrouck I RKSP – ARP – CHU	Wilhelmina (1890–1948)
Charles Ruijs de Beerenbrouck (1873–1936)	Charles Ruijs de Beerenbrouck	9 September 1918	4 August 1925	6 years, 329 days	General League of Roman Catholic Electoral Associations	1922	Ruijs de Beerenbrouck II; RKSP – ARP – CHU	Wilhelmina (1890–1948)
Hendrikus Colijn (1869–1944)	Hendrikus Colijn	4 August 1925	8 March 1926	216 days	Anti-Revolutionary Party	1925	Colijn I RKSP – ARP – CHU	Wilhelmina (1890–1948)
Dirk Jan de Geer (1870–1960)	Dirk Jan de Geer	8 March 1926	10 August 1929	3 years, 155 days	Christian Historical Union	—	De Geer I RKSP – ARP – CHU	Wilhelmina (1890–1948)
Charles Ruijs de Beerenbrouck (1873–1936)	Charles Ruijs de Beerenbrouck	10 August 1929	26 May 1933	3 years, 289 days	Roman Catholic State Party	1929	Ruijs de Beerenbrouck III; RKSP – ARP – CHU	Wilhelmina (1890–1948)
Hendrikus Colijn (1869–1944)	Hendrikus Colijn	26 May 1933	10 August 1939	6 years, 76 days	Anti-Revolutionary Party	1933	Colijn II; RKSP – ARP – CHU – LSP – VDB	Wilhelmina (1890–1948)
Hendrikus Colijn (1869–1944)	Hendrikus Colijn	26 May 1933	10 August 1939	6 years, 76 days	Anti-Revolutionary Party	—	Colijn III; RKSP – ARP – CHU – LSP – VDB	Wilhelmina (1890–1948)
Hendrikus Colijn (1869–1944)	Hendrikus Colijn	26 May 1933	10 August 1939	6 years, 76 days	Anti-Revolutionary Party	1937	Colijn IV; RKSP – ARP – CHU	Wilhelmina (1890–1948)
Hendrikus Colijn (1869–1944)	Hendrikus Colijn	26 May 1933	10 August 1939	6 years, 76 days	Anti-Revolutionary Party	—	Colijn V ARP – CHU – LSP	Wilhelmina (1890–1948)
Dirk Jan de Geer (1870–1960)	Dirk Jan de Geer	10 August 1939	3 September 1940	1 year, 24 days	Christian Historical Union	—	De Geer II; RKSP – SDAP – ARP – CHU – VDB	Wilhelmina (1890–1948)
Pieter Sjoerds Gerbrandy (1885–1961)	Pieter Sjoerds Gerbrandy	3 September 1940	25 June 1945	4 years, 295 days	Anti-Revolutionary Party	—	Gerbrandy I RKSP – SDAP – ARP – CHU – VDB	Wilhelmina (1890–1948)
Pieter Sjoerds Gerbrandy (1885–1961)	Pieter Sjoerds Gerbrandy	3 September 1940	25 June 1945	4 years, 295 days	Anti-Revolutionary Party	—	Gerbrandy II; RKSP – SDAP – ARP – CHU – LSP – VDB	Wilhelmina (1890–1948)
Pieter Sjoerds Gerbrandy (1885–1961)	Pieter Sjoerds Gerbrandy	3 September 1940	25 June 1945	4 years, 295 days	Anti-Revolutionary Party	—	Gerbrandy III; RKSP – ARP – VDB	Wilhelmina (1890–1948)

== Prime ministers (1945-present) ==
Name (born and died)	Portrait	Term of office			Political affiliation	Election	Cabinet	Monarch (Reign)
Name (born and died)	Portrait	Took office	Left office	Tenure	Political affiliation	Election	Cabinet	Monarch (Reign)
Willem Schermerhorn (1894–1977)	Willem Schermerhorn	25 June 1945	3 July 1946	1 year, 8 days	Free-thinking Democratic League until 1946	—	Schermerhorn—Drees; VDB – SDAP – RKSP – CHU	Wilhelmina (1890–1948)
Willem Schermerhorn (1894–1977)	Willem Schermerhorn	25 June 1945	3 July 1946	1 year, 8 days	Labour Party from 1946	—	Schermerhorn—Drees; VDB – SDAP – RKSP – CHU	Wilhelmina (1890–1948)
Louis Beel (1902–1977)	Louis Beel	3 July 1946	7 August 1948	2 years, 35 days	Catholic People's Party	1946	Beel I KVP – PvdA	Wilhelmina (1890–1948)
Willem Drees (1886–1988)	Willem Drees	7 August 1948	22 December 1958	10 years, 137 days	Labour Party	1948	Drees—Van Schaik; PvdA – KVP – CHU – VVD	Wilhelmina (1890–1948)
Willem Drees (1886–1988)	Willem Drees	7 August 1948	22 December 1958	10 years, 137 days	Labour Party	1948	Drees—Van Schaik; PvdA – KVP – CHU – VVD	Juliana (1948–1980)
Willem Drees (1886–1988)	Willem Drees	7 August 1948	22 December 1958	10 years, 137 days	Labour Party	—	Drees I PvdA – KVP – CHU – VVD	Juliana (1948–1980)
Willem Drees (1886–1988)	Willem Drees	7 August 1948	22 December 1958	10 years, 137 days	Labour Party	1952	Drees II; PvdA – KVP – ARP – CHU	Juliana (1948–1980)
Willem Drees (1886–1988)	Willem Drees	7 August 1948	22 December 1958	10 years, 137 days	Labour Party	1956	Drees III; PvdA – KVP – ARP – CHU	Juliana (1948–1980)
Louis Beel (1902–1977)	Louis Beel	22 December 1958	19 May 1959	148 days	Catholic People's Party	—	Beel II; KVP – ARP – CHU	Juliana (1948–1980)
Jan de Quay (1901–1985)	Jan de Quay	19 May 1959	24 July 1963	4 years, 66 days	Catholic People's Party	1959	De Quay; KVP – ARP – CHU – VVD	Juliana (1948–1980)
Victor Marijnen (1917–1975)	Victor Marijnen	24 July 1963	14 April 1965	1 year, 264 days	Catholic People's Party	1963	Marijnen; KVP – ARP – CHU – VVD	Juliana (1948–1980)
Jo Cals (1914–1971)	Jo Cals	14 April 1965	22 November 1966	1 year, 222 days	Catholic People's Party	—	Cals; KVP – ARP – PvdA	Juliana (1948–1980)
Jelle Zijlstra (1918–2001)	Jelle Zijlstra	22 November 1966	5 April 1967	134 days	Anti-Revolutionary Party	—	Zijlstra; KVP – ARP	Juliana (1948–1980)
Piet de Jong (1915–2016)	Piet de Jong	5 April 1967	6 July 1971	4 years, 92 days	Catholic People's Party	1967	De Jong; KVP – ARP – CHU – VVD	Juliana (1948–1980)
Barend Biesheuvel (1920–2001)	Barend Biesheuvel	6 July 1971	11 May 1973	1 year, 309 days	Anti-Revolutionary Party	1971	Biesheuvel I ARP – KVP – CHU – VVD – DS'70	Juliana (1948–1980)
Barend Biesheuvel (1920–2001)	Barend Biesheuvel	6 July 1971	11 May 1973	1 year, 309 days	Anti-Revolutionary Party	—	Biesheuvel II; ARP – KVP – CHU – VVD	Juliana (1948–1980)
Joop den Uyl (1919–1987)	Joop den Uyl	11 May 1973	19 December 1977	4 years, 222 days	Labour Party	1972	Den Uyl; PvdA – KVP – ARP – D66 – PPR	Juliana (1948–1980)
Dries van Agt (1931–2024)	Dries van Agt	19 December 1977	4 November 1982	4 years, 320 days	Christian Democratic Appeal	1977	Van Agt I CDA – VVD	Juliana (1948–1980)
Dries van Agt (1931–2024)	Dries van Agt	19 December 1977	4 November 1982	4 years, 320 days	Christian Democratic Appeal	1977	Van Agt I CDA – VVD	Beatrix (1980–2013)
Dries van Agt (1931–2024)	Dries van Agt	19 December 1977	4 November 1982	4 years, 320 days	Christian Democratic Appeal	1981	Van Agt II; CDA – PvdA – D66	Beatrix (1980–2013)
Dries van Agt (1931–2024)	Dries van Agt	19 December 1977	4 November 1982	4 years, 320 days	Christian Democratic Appeal	—	Van Agt III; CDA – D66	Beatrix (1980–2013)
Ruud Lubbers (1939–2018)	Ruud Lubbers	4 November 1982	22 August 1994	11 years, 291 days	Christian Democratic Appeal	1982	Lubbers I CDA – VVD	Beatrix (1980–2013)
Ruud Lubbers (1939–2018)	Ruud Lubbers	4 November 1982	22 August 1994	11 years, 291 days	Christian Democratic Appeal	1986	Lubbers II; CDA – VVD	Beatrix (1980–2013)
Ruud Lubbers (1939–2018)	Ruud Lubbers	4 November 1982	22 August 1994	11 years, 291 days	Christian Democratic Appeal	1989	Lubbers III; CDA – PvdA	Beatrix (1980–2013)
Wim Kok (1938–2018)	Wim Kok	22 August 1994	22 July 2002	7 years, 334 days	Labour Party	1994	Kok I PvdA – VVD – D66	Beatrix (1980–2013)
Wim Kok (1938–2018)	Wim Kok	22 August 1994	22 July 2002	7 years, 334 days	Labour Party	1998	Kok II; PvdA – VVD – D66	Beatrix (1980–2013)
Jan Peter Balkenende (born 1956)	Jan Peter Balkenende	22 July 2002	14 October 2010	8 years, 84 days	Christian Democratic Appeal	2002	Balkenende I CDA – LPF – VVD	Beatrix (1980–2013)
Jan Peter Balkenende (born 1956)	Jan Peter Balkenende	22 July 2002	14 October 2010	8 years, 84 days	Christian Democratic Appeal	2003	Balkenende II; CDA – VVD – D66	Beatrix (1980–2013)
Jan Peter Balkenende (born 1956)	Jan Peter Balkenende	22 July 2002	14 October 2010	8 years, 84 days	Christian Democratic Appeal	—	Balkenende III; CDA – VVD	Beatrix (1980–2013)
Jan Peter Balkenende (born 1956)	Jan Peter Balkenende	22 July 2002	14 October 2010	8 years, 84 days	Christian Democratic Appeal	2006	Balkenende IV; CDA – PvdA – CU	Beatrix (1980–2013)
Mark Rutte (born 1967)	Mark Rutte	14 October 2010	2 July 2024	13 years, 262 days	People's Party for Freedom and Democracy	2010	Rutte I VVD – CDA	Beatrix (1980–2013)
Mark Rutte (born 1967)	Mark Rutte	14 October 2010	2 July 2024	13 years, 262 days	People's Party for Freedom and Democracy	2012	Rutte II; VVD – PvdA	Beatrix (1980–2013)
Mark Rutte (born 1967)	Mark Rutte	14 October 2010	2 July 2024	13 years, 262 days	People's Party for Freedom and Democracy	2012	Rutte II; VVD – PvdA	Willem-Alexander (2013–present)
Mark Rutte (born 1967)	Mark Rutte	14 October 2010	2 July 2024	13 years, 262 days	People's Party for Freedom and Democracy	2017	Rutte III; VVD – CDA – D66 – CU	Willem-Alexander (2013–present)
Mark Rutte (born 1967)	Mark Rutte	14 October 2010	2 July 2024	13 years, 262 days	People's Party for Freedom and Democracy	2021	Rutte IV; VVD – CDA – D66 – CU	Willem-Alexander (2013–present)
Dick Schoof (born 1957)	Dick Schoof	2 July 2024	23 February 2026	1 year, 236 days	Independent	2023	Schoof; PVV – VVD – NSC – BBB	Willem-Alexander (2013–present)
Rob Jetten (born 1987)	Rob Jetten	23 February 2026	Incumbent	203 days	Democrats 66	2025	Jetten; D66 – VVD – CDA	Willem-Alexander (2013–present)

== See also ==
- Historical rankings of prime ministers of the Netherlands
- Religious affiliations of prime ministers of the Netherlands
