= Alliance to Democratise the Forces =

Former Dutch political party

The Alliance to Democratise the Forces (in Dutch: Verbond tot Democratisering der Weermacht, VDW) was a Dutch political party representing military interests. The VDW played only a marginal role in Dutch politics.

== Party history ==
The VDW was founded as a political arm of the officers' union Ons Belang (Our Interest). The 1918 elections were the first election in the Netherlands which used a system of proportional representation. With only 7000 votes (0.5% of the votes) the VDW one seat, as did several other one or two person parties. After the elections the election law became more restrictive. Between 1918 and 1921 the VDW cooperated in the neutral parliamentary party, with other four one or two seat parties, namely the Peasants' League, the Economic League, the Middle Class Party and the Neutral Party. The parliamentary party was led by former minister Willem Treub. The alliance ended in 1921 when the Economic League, the Middle Class Party and the Neutral Party all merged into the Liberal State Party, together with two larger liberal parties. The VDW did not take part in the 1922 election.

== Ideology & issues ==
The VDW was a typical special interest party. Its main goal was to represent the interests of officers and petty officers. It favoured the implementation of a conscripted army in which men would serve as soldiers and women as nurses. It wanted schools to teach more physical education and youth to do more sports and shooting exercises. It advocated free education and free healthcare for students. It wanted a stronger army and fleet. It favoured a more democratic army, with a stronger role for military unions, better salaries and pensions for officers.

== Electoral history ==
=== House of Representatives ===
Election	Lead candidate	List	Votes	%	Seats	+/–	Government	Ref.
1918	Willem Wijk	List	6,828	0.51	1 / 100	▲1		

== Electorate ==
The party drew probably most its support from military personnel.
