= Liberalism in the Netherlands =

Liberalism in the Netherlands started as an anti-monarchical effort spearheaded by the Dutch statesman Thorbecke, who almost single-handedly wrote the 1848 Constitution of the Netherlands that turned the country into a constitutional monarchy.

In contemporary politics, there are both left and right-wing parties that refer to themselves as "liberal", with the former more often espousing social liberalism and the latter more often espousing conservative liberalism. A common characteristic of these parties that they are nominally secular, in contrast to the traditionally dominant and still popular Christian democracy.

This article gives an overview of liberalism in the Netherlands. It is limited to political parties with substantial support, mainly proved by having had a representation in parliament.

== Background ==
The Netherlands has a long liberal political tradition. From the founding of the Dutch Republic in the 16th century to beginning of the 19th century the main political conflict was between the liberal urban patriciate and the supporters of the House of Orange, from the lower class and orthodox variants of Protestantism. The urban patriciate favoured religious tolerance. Between mid-19th century to the late-1800 they were a dominant force in shaping the Dutch parliamentary democratic rechtsstaat. In the early 20th century the liberals split between progressive liberals and conservative liberals. Due to their political division and the introduction of universal suffrage the liberals disappeared from the political stage. After the Second World War the liberals were united again under one roof, the VVD, but the party remained small. It entered some administration coalitions as a junior party. A progressive liberal party, D'66 was founded in 1966. Since the 1970s however liberalism has been on the rise again electorally. Since 1977 the largest, more conservative, liberal party, VVD has been in government for twenty two years. In early 21st century the VVD saw major splits over the issue of integration and migration. In 2010, they won the national elections for the first time in its history.

=== Before 1918 ===
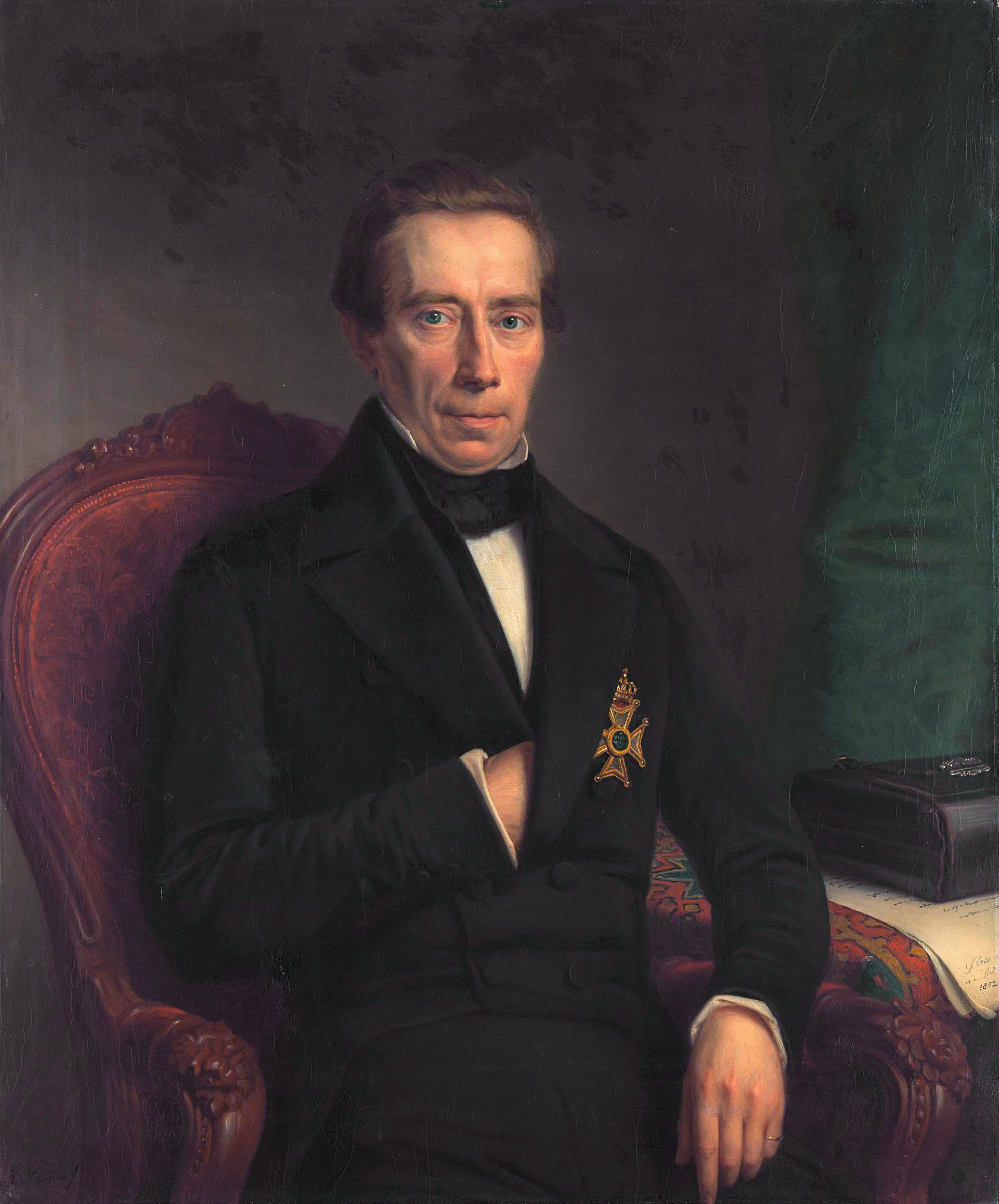
Johan Rudolph Thorbecke in 1852, during his first term as Prime Minister.

In the early years of the Kingdom of the Netherlands (1814–1848) the House of Representatives was dominated by conservatives supportive of the policy of government of William I and later William II. From 1840 onward, the amount of liberals in the House gradually increased. These liberals advocated a parliamentary democracy with a directly elected House of Representatives and in which the ministers, not the King, had executive power. In 1844, nine liberal representatives led by the jurist and historian Johan Rudolph Thorbecke attempted in vain to amend the constitution and introduce parliamentary democracy. In 1848, amidst a wave of revolutions across Europe, the balance of power shifted in favour of the liberals. In order to prevent civil unrest in the Netherlands, William II formed a commission, chaired by Thorbecke, which would draft a new constitution. The new constitution, which was introduced in October 1848, limited the power of the king by introducing ministerial responsibility and by giving parliament the right to amend laws and hold investigative hearings. It also extended the census suffrage and codified civil rights, such as the freedom of assembly, the privacy of correspondence, freedom of ecclesiastical organisation and the freedom of education.

In the period following the constitutional amendment, liberalism was the dominant political force in the Netherlands. Liberalism also dominated the universities, the media and business. The liberals supported a laissez-faire economy, free trade, civil rights and a gradual expansion of suffrage. Thorbecke became Prime Minister of the Netherlands in 1849, and would serve two more terms throughout his lifetime. Because of their dominant position, the liberals did not deem it necessary to organise themselves in a political party. Instead there was a loose liberal parliamentary group and locally organised liberal caucuses. The liberals also did not organize their own pillar, a system of like-minded social organisations. The liberals were politically allied with the Catholics, whom the liberals granted considerable freedom of religion. After Thorbecke's death in 1872, the liberals grew increasingly disunited. By 1897, a division had emerged between the supporters of the progressive liberal Jan Kappeyne van de Coppello on the one side, and those of the conservative liberal Johan George Gleichman on the other.

Only in the late 19th century, when the opposition began to organise itself in the Anti-Revolutionary Party and the Roman Catholic State Party, the liberals followed suit. On 4 March 1885, the Liberal Union was established. In the 1890s some liberals, such as Samuel van Houten, Johannes Tak van Poortvliet and Kappeyne van de Coppello started to propose a more active role of the government, breaking with the Thorbeckian laissez-faire ideal. This led to the establishment of the progressive Free-thinking Democratic League in 1901. The liberals saw a second split with the establishment of the more conservative liberal League of Free Liberals in 1906. There are different names for these two tendencies. The more progressive liberals have been called "radical", "freeminded" or "democratic" liberals, while the more conservative liberals have been called "free" or "old" liberals. The issue which divided the liberals most was the question whether to extend the census or even to introduce universal suffrage, the progressive liberals favoured universal suffrage, the conservative liberals did not. The progressive liberals also favoured government intervention in the economy, such as Van Houten's ban on child labour.

Due to the two round electoral system the liberals were required to cooperate. In order to prevent the coalition of Catholics and Protestants win the second round of the elections, all the liberals united behind their candidates in the second round, often joined by social democrats. This alliance was called the concentration. On basis of concentration pluralities, often supported by social democrats for a majority several cabinets were formed in the early 20th century.

In 1917 under one of these liberal minority cabinets universal male suffrage was introduced, as well as a proportional electoral system and equal finance for religious schools, this compromise was called the pacification of 1917. The extension of suffrage however severely weakened the position of the liberals. Of the 37 seats they had in 1917, they were left with 14 in 1918.

=== 1918-1994 ===
In 1922 the liberal parties reorganized: all conservative liberals, from the Liberal Union and the League Free Liberals as well as more conservative liberals from smaller parties, joined to form the Liberal State Party. The progressive liberals remained separate in the Freeminded Democratic League, a merger of the Radical League and progressive liberals, that had already been formed in 1901. In the interbellum the liberals grew even smaller. Under pressure of the Wall Street Crash of 1929 and the rise of the National Socialist Movement. The liberals did cooperate as junior partners in several cabinets in the crisis.

After the Second World War the conservative liberal Liberal State Party refounded itself as Freedom Party. The progressive liberal Freeminded Democratic League joined the new Doorbraak leftwing Labour Party. Several progressives were unhappy with the social-democratic course of the PvdA and joined the Freedom Party to found the People's Party for Freedom and Democracy in 1948.

The VVD remained a small party until the 1970s, with about 10% of the vote. They did however form part of the government both in the grand coalition with social-democrats, Catholics and Protestants in the late 1940s early 1950s, and with the Catholics and Protestants over the course of the 1960s. The party was led by the former leader of the Freeminded Democratic League, Pieter Oud. In the Dutch pillarized political system the liberals mainly appealed to urban, secular upper and middle class. The liberals did not have a strong pillar of social organization, such as trade unions and news papers, like the other political families had. Instead they were aligned with the weak neutral pillar.

In 1966 a radical democratic party was founded, Democrats 66. In the foundation several progressive liberals from the VVD had been involved. The party sought to radically democratize the political system, the society and the economy. D66 was led by the charismatic Hans van Mierlo. The party joined forces with the social-democratic PvdA and the progressive Christian PPR to work for a more fair and democratic Netherlands. The party participated in the leftwing cabinet Den Uyl. Over the course of the 1980s however the party began to espouse a more progressive liberal course, especially under Jan Terlouw. The party remained an ally of the PvdA however, joining a short-lived centre-left coalition cabinet with the PvdA and the Christian democratic CDA in 1981.

In the meanwhile the VVD had grown considerably. Under the leadership of Hans Wiegel the VVD has taken a more conservative course. The party began to criticize the large and inefficient welfare state. The party combined this economic liberalism with progressive positions on social issues, which characterized the 1970s, such as abortion, homosexuality and women's rights. The VVD capitalized the weakening of religious and depillarization of the 1970s and made considerable electoral gains: in 1967 the party won just over 10% in 1981 this had more than doubled to 23%.

Between 1982 and 1986 the VVD cooperated in the centre-right cabinets Lubbers, which implemented a far reaching reform of the welfare state the VVD had advocated since the 1970s.

=== After 1994 ===
In 1994 the Christian democratic CDA lost its traditional electoral power base. The VVD and D66 won considerably. A progressive purple cabinet was formed with D66 and the VVD under the lead of PvdA. The cabinet managed a thriving Dutch economy, implemented progressive social legislation on euthanasia, gay marriage and prostitution. In the 2002 election campaign the purple coalition came under heavy criticism of the populist politician Pim Fortuyn for mismanaging the public sector, migration and the integration of migrants. The two liberal parties lost considerably in the elections. Liberalism in the Netherlands came under attack after the shock assassination of Fortuyn just days before the election.

The VVD however joined a coalition cabinet with the heirs of Fortuyn and the CDA. The cabinet fell shortly. After the 2003 elections the D66 replaced the LPF. The centre-right cabinet implemented reforms of the welfare state and oversaw declining migration figures.

Migration and integration and especially the place of the Islam in the Netherlands, however, remained controversial issues. In 2003 the VVD had invited social-democratic critic of Islam, Ayaan Hirsi Ali to join their parliamentary party. She together with MP Geert Wilders caused considerable controversy with her direct criticism of the Islam. In the cabinet VVD minister Rita Verdonk sought to limit migration and stimulate integration of minorities. Two years after Fortuyn's assassination, another murder, this time of filmmaker Theo van Gogh, put the country's liberal tradition at further risk.

In 2004 Geert Wilders left the VVD to form the Party for Freedom, which combined uncompromising criticism of Islam with a plea for lower taxation and skepticism towards European integration. In 2006 a conflict between Hirsi Ali and Verdonk over her status as an asylum seeker caused the downfall of the cabinet after D66 had revoked its confidence of Verdonk, whose positions on migration the party had already distanced itself from.

In the 2006 general election the VVD and D66 lost considerably: D66 lost three of its six seats, the VVD six of its 28 seats. Wilders' PVV won nine seats. Rita Verdonk, second on the list of the VVD won more preference votes than the party's lead candidate Mark Rutte. After demanding the leadership of the party, Verdonk left the VVD to form her own nationalist party, Proud of the Netherlands.

In the European Parliament election of 2009, the VVD and D66 both won 3 seats each, while PVV picked up 4 seats. The PVV was assigned the additional seat that went to the Netherlands after the Treaty of Lisbon was signed. The VVD and D66 joined the Liberal fraction in the European Parliament, while the PVV did not register as member of any fraction.

In the 2010 general election the VVD returned to previous strength and became the largest party the first time in history with 31 seats, leading to a liberal-led coalition for the first time since 1918. Also D66 increased their number of seats to 10. Ultimately, the VVD opted for a coalition with the CDA, with VVD leader Mark Rutte as prime minister—the first liberal to hold the post since 1918.

== Individual Liberal Parties ==
Note: The ⇒ sign denotes parties which never achieved any representation in parliament.

=== From Liberal Union until People's Party for Freedom and Democracy ===
- 1885: Liberals formed the Liberal Union (Liberale Unie)
- 1892: A radical faction formed the ⇒ Radical League (Radicale Bond)
- 1894: A conservative faction formed the ⇒ Free Liberals
- 1901: A radical faction seceded to merge with the ⇒ Radical League into the ⇒ Freethinking Democratic League
- 1921: The LU merged with the ⇒ Economic League, the ⇒ League of Free Liberals, the Neutral Party and the Middle Class Party into the Freedom League (Vrijheidsbond)
- 1922: A conservative faction seceded as the ⇒ Liberal Party
- 1928: The Vrijheidsbond is renamed in Liberal State Party (Liberale Staatspartij)
- 1929: Staalman, founder of the Middle Class Party, leaves the LSP and found the Middle Party for City and Country
- 1945: The LSP is reorganised into the Freedom Party (Partij van de Vrijheid), including a faction of the ⇒ Freethinking Democratic League
- 1948: The Freedom Party merged with former members of the Freethinking Democratic League into the present-day People's Party for Freedom and Democracy (Volkspartij voor Vrijheid en Democratie)

=== Radical League and Free-minded Democratic League ===
- 1892: A radical faction of the ⇒ Liberal Union formed the Radical League (Radicale Bond)
- 1901: A second radical faction of the ⇒ Liberal Union merged with the Radical League into the Free-minded Democratic League (Vrijzinnig Democratische Bond)
- 1917: A right-wing faction secededas the ⇒ Economic League
- 1946: The Free-minded Democratic League merged into the present-day Labour Party (Partij van de Arbeid), a faction joined the ⇒ Freedom Party
- 1948: Some former members left the Labour Party and merged into the ⇒ People's Party for Freedom and Democracy

=== (League of) Free Liberals ===
- 1894: A conservative faction of the ⇒ Liberale Union formed the Free Liberals (Vrije Liberalen), since 1906 renamed the League of Free Liberals (Bond van Vrije Liberalen)
- 1921: The league merged into the ⇒ Freedom League

=== Economic League ===
- 1917: A right-wing faction of the ⇒ Freethinking Democratic League formed the Economic League (Economische Bond)
- 1921: The league merged into the ⇒ Freedom League

=== Liberal Party ===
- 1922: A right-wing faction of the ⇒ Freedom League formed the Liberal Party (Liberale Partij) and disappeared in 1925

=== Democrats 66 ===
- 1966: Independent progressive liberals formed the party Democrats 66 (Democraten '66), later without apostrophe

=== Volt ===
- 2018: Volt Netherlands (Volt Nederland) was founded.

== Liberal leaders ==
- Liberals in the 19th century
  - Johan Rudolf Thorbecke
  - Joannes Kappeyne van de Coppello
  - Pieter Cort van der Linden
- Liberal Union
  - Nicolaas Pierson
  - Theo de Meester
  - Cornelis Lely
  - Johannes Tak van Poortvliet
  - Hendrik Goeman Borgesius
  - Pieter Rink
- Radical League/Economic League
  - Willem Treub
- League of Free Liberals
  - Willem de Beaufort
  - Hendrik Dresselhuys
  - Samuel van Houten
  - Meinard Tydeman
  - Hendrik Coenraad Dresselhuijs
- Free-thinking Democratic League
  - Philip Kohnstamm
  - Dirk Bos
  - Hendrik Lodewijk Drucker
  - Pieter Oud
  - Roelof Kranenburg
  - Dolf Joekes
- Liberal Party
  - Samuel van Houten
- Freedom Party
  - Steven Bierema
- Liberal State Party
  - Hendrik Coenraad Dresselhuijs
  - Dirk Fock
  - Willem Carel Wendelaar
  - Ben Telders
- People's Party for Freedom and Democracy
  - Pieter Oud
  - Edzo Toxopeus
  - Molly Geertsema
  - Hans Wiegel
  - Ed Nijpels
  - Rudolf de Korte
  - Joris Voorhoeve
  - Frits Bolkestein
  - Hans Dijkstal
  - Gerrit Zalm
  - Jozias van Aartsen
  - Mark Rutte
  - Dirk Stikker
  - Johan Witteveen
  - Otto van Lidth de Jeude
  - Harm van Riel
  - Klaas Dijkhoff
  - Arie Pais
  - Hans de Koster
  - Annemarie Jorritsma
  - Haya van Someren
  - Annelien Kappeyne van de Coppello
  - Henk Kamp
  - Uri Rosenthal
  - Henk Korthals
  - Frits Korthals Altes
  - Johan Remkes
  - Leendert Ginjaar
  - Hans Hoogervorst
  - Neelie Kroes
  - Jo Schouwenaar-Franssen
  - Hans van Baalen
  - Henk Vonhoff
  - Ivo Opstelten
  - Koos Rietkerk
- Democrats 66
  - Hans van Mierlo
  - Jan Terlouw
  - Els Borst
  - Alexander Pechtold
  - Jacob Kohnstamm
  - Jan Glastra van Loon
  - Aar de Goede
  - Alexander Rinnooy Kan
  - Thom de Graaf
  - Hans Wijers
  - Roger van Boxtel
  - Laurens Jan Brinkhorst
  - Sigrid Kaag
  - Rob Jetten

== Liberal thinkers ==
In the Contributions to liberal theory the following Dutch thinkers are included:

- Erasmus (1466–1536)
- Hugo Grotius (1583–1645)
- Baruch Spinoza (1632–1677)
- Johan Rudolf Thorbecke (1798–1872)

== See also ==
- Anarchism in the Netherlands
- History of the Netherlands
- Politics of the Netherlands
- List of political parties in the Netherlands
- Loevestein faction, Dutch States Party
- Orangism (Kingdom of the Netherlands)
- Socialism in the Netherlands
- Christian democracy in the Netherlands
- Pim Fortuyn List
- Party for Freedom
