= Democratic Party (Netherlands) =

Former Dutch political party

Democratic Party Democratische Partij
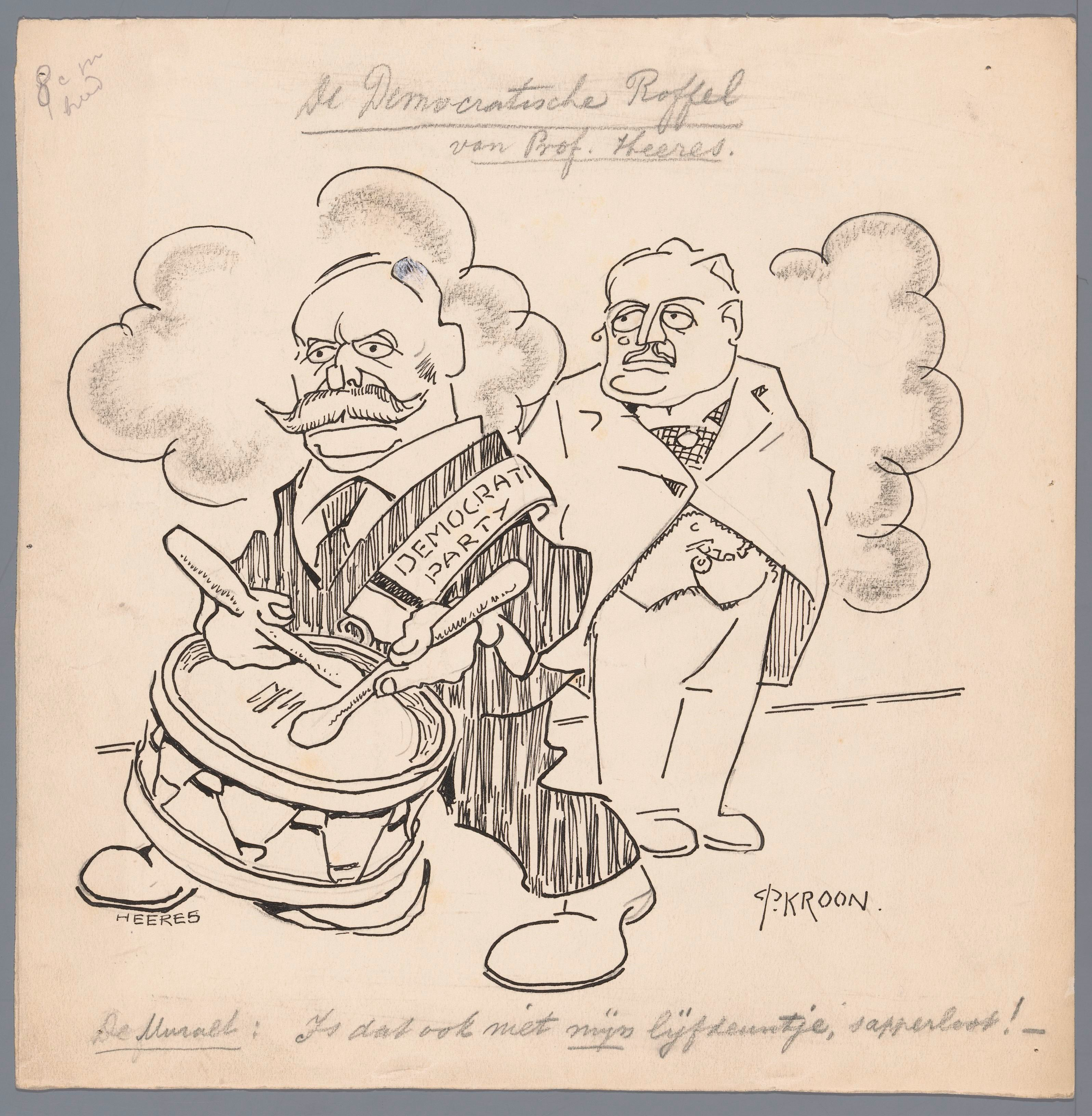
- Political cartoon from 1921 depicting Heeres founding the party
- Abbreviation: DP
- Founder: Jan Ernst Heeres
- Founded: 13 November 1921
- Dissolved: 1932

The Democratic Party (Dutch: Democratische Partij) was a left liberal political party in the Netherlands. It was founded in 1921 by Jan Ernst Heeres when the Liberal Union, of which he was president, failed to merge with the Free-thinking Democratic League (VDB), and instead merged with the more conservative League of Free Liberals and Economic League.

At the party's first general election, the 1922 election, with Heeres leading the candidates list, it failed to attract enough votes for a seat in the House of Representatives. Its highest vote tally was at the 1925 election when it received 11,000 votes, which, at less than half a per cent of the total votes, was still insufficient to earn a seat. While members of the Democratic Party did manage to earn seats in the Provincial council and various city councils, it failed at the subsequent general elections in 1929. When Heeres died in 1932, the Democratic Party ceased to exist.
