= Middle Party for City and Country =

Defunct Dutch political party

The Middle Party for City and Country (in Dutch: Middenpartij voor Stad en Land, MPSL) was a Dutch political party defending the interests of the middle class. The Middle Party played only a marginal role in Dutch politics.

== Party history ==
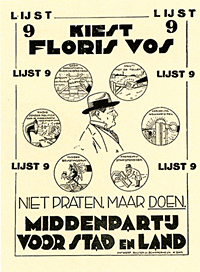
Election poster from 1929

The party was founded by Abraham Staalman who had previously been member of the liberal Liberal State Party (LSP) after his own Middle Class Party had merged into that. Before the elections of 1929 Staalman had founded his own party and had left the LSP parliamentary party.

The Middle Party entered in the 1929 elections, who held a personality-based campaign around the Bussum milk industrial and anti-toll campaigner Floris Vos. The Middle Party was able to win one seat in the House of Representatives. The party played a marginal role in parliament. Vos came into conflict with Staalman over his support for a law on mandatory closing times for shops. The party consequently fell apart in parties around Staalman and Vos, who fought legal battles over the ownership of the party's name. Neither party entered in the 1933 election.

== Ideology and issues ==
The party wanted to increase public wealth by reducing the restrictions for trade, industry and agriculture. The most important issues of the Middle Party were the abolition of trade restriction, especially toll roads, import tariffs and several levies. The party wanted to reduce government expenditure by reducing the number of civil servants and the replacement of unemployment benefits by public works programs.

== Leadership and support ==
This table shows the Middle Party's results in elections to the House of Representatives and Senate, as well as the party's political leadership: the fractievoorzitter, is the chair of the parliamentary party and the lijsttrekker is the party's top candidate in the general election, these posts are normally taken by the party's leader.

Year	HoR	S	Lijsttrekker	Fractievoorzitter
1929	1	0	Floris Vos	Floris Vos
1930	1	0	no elections	Floris Vos
1931	1	0	no elections	Floris Vos
1932	1	0	no elections	Floris Vos

== Electorate ==
The electorate of the Middle Party was concentrated in Amsterdam and the Gooi, a region around Hilversum, where Vos came from. The party drew its main support from farmers and the middle class.
