= Liberal state =

Liberal state may refer to:

- In classical terms, a nation that is a liberal democracy, having an elected government, supporting freedom of speech, freedom of religion, respect for the law, etc.
- More recently, a nation, country or subnational state that typically follows liberalism, tending to emphasize policies such as individual rights, the government's role in social and fiscal equality including having more assertive fiscal and social policies, etc.
- In the United States, typically a blue state, a US state that since about 1980 tends to elect members of the Democratic Party more often than members of the Republican Party

== See also ==
- Liberal State Party (1921–1948), a former political party in the Netherlands historically linked to the People's Party for Freedom and Democracy (VVD), a modern major Dutch political party
