= Peasants' League =

The Peasants' League (in Dutch: Plattelandersbond, PB) was a Dutch agrarian political party. The League played only a minor role in Dutch politics.

== Party history ==
The party was founded in 1917. In the elections of 1918, the party won one seat. It had campaigned with two lists, one religious list and one secular list, in order to appeal to both religious and secular farmers. During the First World War, the Netherlands, a neutral country, had to rely on its own agriculture. Government influence in agriculture had increased, much to the unhappiness of many farmers. The party's seat was taken by Frederik Bos. Between 1918 and 1919, the League cooperated in the neutral parliamentary party, with other four one or two seat parties, namely the Alliance to Democratise the Forces, the Economic League, the Middle Class Party and the Neutral Party. The parliamentary party was led by former minister Willem Treub. In 1919 Bos was replaced by Arend Braat as member of parliament. Braat was an unsophisticated and unconventional MP, who attempted to revoke the law on daylight saving time on five occasions but failed in each. He was ignored by most other politicians and scorned by the media for his unsophisticated behaviour. He immediately left the neutral parliamentary party.

In the elections of 1922, the party won an additional seat, this is partially explained by Braat's unconventional behaviour, which appealed to the rural voters. The party's second MP De Boer tried to replace Braat as party leader. He was removed from the party ranks and participated in the 1925 elections. Braat lost his second seat, but De Boer was unable to win a seat. After the 1929 election, the leadership of Braat became even more contested. Because of his aggressive strategy against supporters of De Boer the party's organisation was not functioning well. Before the 1933 elections, the party changed its name to National Farmers', Horticulturists' and Middle Class Party (Nationale Boeren-, Tuinders- en Middenstandspartij, NBTM) and renewed its party organisations. In this election it had two top candidates Cornelis Vervoorn, a rich farmer, for the Northern provinces of Groningen and Drenthe and Arend Braat, who has been the party's leader for a long time, for the rest of the Netherlands. Unexpectedly Vervoorn was elected into parliament because he received more votes than Braat. Braat tried to convince Vervoorn to give up his seat, but he refused. In the 1937 election, the party lost its seat, this is partially explained by the rise of the National Socialist Movement, which was linked to a strong agrarian organisation Agriculture and Society

== Ideology & issues ==
The party advocated for the interests of farmers and tried to fight the disadvantaged position of rural communities. The party saw agriculture as the primary source of wealth of the Netherlands. Its main goal was to ensure a reasonable income for farmers, to expand the farming sector and protect property rights. It wanted to abolish Daylight saving time, reduce taxation and government interference, found a ministry of agriculture, implement an old age pension, improve agricultural education, and end the merger of municipalities. The change of name in 1933 to National Farmers', Horticulturists' and Middle Class Party also implied an ideological reorientation. The party is now also oriented towards the middle class in urban areas, while still holding on to its agrarian ideals. Small businesses, or the middle class, were seen as the link between farmers and consumers. It added several proposals to its party manifesto such as a cheaper supply of credit and the regulation of advertisements.

== Leadership & support ==
This table shows the Peasants' League's results in elections to the House of Representatives and Senate, as well as the party's political leadership: the fractievoorzitter, is the chair of the parliamentary party and the lijsttrekker is the party's top candidate in the general election, these posts are normally taken by the party's leader.

Year	HoR	S	Lijsttrekker	Fractievoorzitter
1918	1	0	Frederik Bos	Frederik Bos
1919	1	0	no elections	Arend Braat
1920	1	0	no elections	Arend Braat
1921	1	0	no elections	Arend Braat
1922	2	0	Arend Braat	Arend Braat
1923	2	0	no election	Arend Braat
1924	2	0	no election	Arend Braat
1925	1	0	Arend Braat	Arend Braat
1926	2	0	no election	Arend Braat
1927	1	0	no election	Arend Braat
1928	1	0	no election	Arend Braat
1929	1	0	Arend Braat	Arend Braat
1930	1	0	no election	Arend Braat
1931	1	0	no election	Arend Braat
1932	1	0	no election	Arend Braat
1933	1	0	Arend Braat and Cornelis Vervoorn	Cornelis Vervoorn
1934	1	0	no election	Cornelis Vervoorn
1935	1	0	no election	Cornelis Vervoorn
1936	1	0	no election	Cornelis Vervoorn

=== Municipal and provincial government ===
The party was particularly strong in the provincial legislatives of Drenthe and Groningen. Where it also held several seats in local legislatives.

== Electorate ==
The electorate of party consisted out of farmers form Drenthe, Gelderland, the northern region of North Holland and the southern islands of South Holland.
