= Maria Elisabeth Bes =

Dutch chemical engineer & Delft city councillor

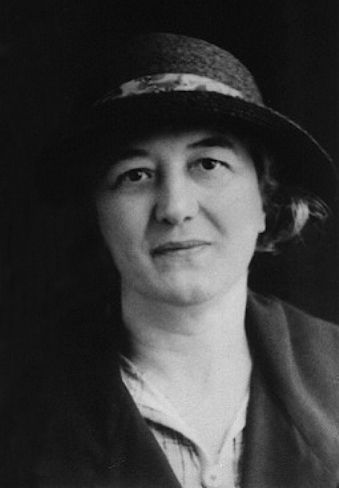
- Bes, c. 1925
- Born: Maria Elisabeth Stellwag-Bes; 14 January 1882; Tilburg, North Brabant, Netherlands
- Died: 7 August 1938 (aged 56); The Hague, South Holland, Netherlands
- Resting place: Jaffa Cemetery, Delft, South Holland, Netherlands

Maria Elisabeth (Marie) Stellwag-Bes (14 January 1882 – 7 August 1938) was a Dutch chemical engineer and city councillor in Delft for the Vrijzinnig Democratische Bond. She is considered to be the first woman to receive an engineering diploma in the Netherlands and was one of the first three female city councillors in Delft.

== Early life and education ==
Bes was born in Tilburg in 1882, the daughter of Klaas Bes and Johanna Bes (née Stoel). Her father worked as a mathematics teacher at the Tilburg secondary school. After completing her primary school education in 1894, Bes became the first female student in Tilburg to be admitted to the secondary school. Permission for this had to be sought from, and granted by the minister. In 1899, she successfully completed her final school exams, and the following year she started as the first female student at the Polytechische School te Delft, studying in the Technology department.

On 27 July 1904, Bes graduated in chemical engineering from the Polytechnic, becoming the first female graduate engineer in the Netherlands. That same year, she was appointed as an assistant in physics at her former college, which was upgraded in status to a technical college and renamed the Technische Hoogeschool Delft in 1905, to emphasise the academic quality of the education. In 1910 Bes became an assistant for theoretical and applied physics there, and in 1919 she was appointed as a permanent member of staff. In 1926 she left her job because of health issues.

== Political career ==
In the 1910s, Bes became politically active, joining the Vrijzinnig Democratische Bond (VBD) (transl. Liberal Democratic League), a progressive liberal political party in the Netherlands. This led to Bes becoming was one of the founders of the national Vrijzinnig Democratische Vrouwenclub along with a number of women including Aletta Jacobs, a physician and leading women's suffrage activist. Bes was a member of the VBV's central board.

In 1918, Bes ran as a candidate for the Liberal Democrats in the national Tweede Kamerverkiezingen elections held on 21 May. The election was the first held after a series of reforms, known as "the Great Pacification" which introduced universal male suffrage and proportional representation, replacing the previous first-past-the-post voting in single member constituencies. Women could stand for election but were not able to vote themselves, only gaining that right in 1919. The liberal parties lost the most seats and Bes was not elected.

The following year 1919 Bes became party leader for the VDB in the municipal elections in Delft. She received about two thirds of the total 182 votes cast for the party, and sat on the Delft city council until March 1920. She made a name for herself on the council as a campaigner for alcohol control.

== Marriage and death ==
On 15 July 1920 Bes married the Evangelical Lutheran pastor Theodoor Gotlieb Stellwag (1888-1935). The couple lived in the presbytery of the Evangelical Lutheran Church, a historic building at 253 Oude Delft.

After her marriage, Bes became active at the Lutheran Church in Delft, where among other things she worked as a teacher in the Sunday school.

After the death of her husband in 1935, Bes moved, with her maid, to The Hague, where she died on 7 August 1938 at the age of 56. Bes was buried in the Jaffa cemetery in Delft on 10 August 1938.

== Commemoration ==
The Marie Besstraat, a street in Delft, was named after her in 1988.

In 2017, Marie Bes was awarded a place in the Alumni Walk of Fame, created to celebrate the 175th anniversary of TU Delft, to celebrate her place as the first woman to graduate as an engineer from the University.
