= Folkert Posthuma =

Dutch politician

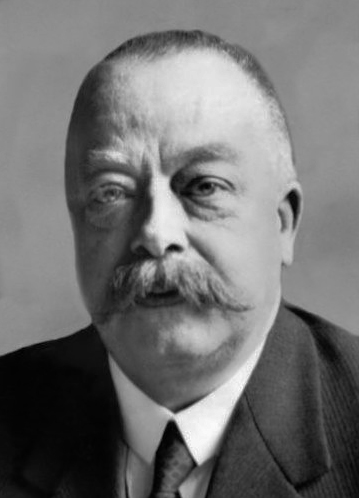
Folkert Posthuma in 1930

Folkert Evert Posthuma (20 May 1874 – 3 June 1943) was a Dutch politician.

== Biography ==
During World War I, he was the Minister of Agriculture, Industry and Trade in the government of Cort van der Linden and as such responsible for the food distribution. Before and after his ministership he held a senior management position at the insurance company Centraal Beheer. In the 1930s he became a sympathiser, but not a member, of the NSB. In 1943 he was asked by NSB leader Anton Mussert to become his representative for agriculture but was assassinated later that year by the Dutch resistance and communist Jan Verleun.

Government offices
Preceded by Willem Treub	Minister of Agriculture, Industry and Trade; 1914–1918	Succeeded by Hendrik Albert van IJsselsteyn
