= 1922 Dutch general election =

- 5 July 1922
- All 100 seats in the House of Representatives; 51 seats needed for a majority
Party	Leader	Vote %	Seats	+/–
AB	Willem Hubert Nolens	29.86	32	+2
SDAP	Pieter Jelles Troelstra	19.38	20	−2
ARP	Hendrikus Colijn	13.73	16	+3
CHU	Johannes Theodoor de Visser	10.88	11	+4
LSP	Hendrik Coenraad Dresselhuijs	9.26	10	New
VDB	Henri Marchant	4.59	5	0
CPH	David Wijnkoop	1.83	2	0
PB	Arend Braat	1.56	2	+1
LP	Samuel van Houten	0.96	1	New
SGP	Gerrit Hendrik Kersten	0.91	1	+1
This lists parties that won seats. See the complete results below.
Cabinet before	Cabinet after
First Ruijs de Beerenbrouck cabinet AB–ARP–CHU	Second Ruijs de Beerenbrouck cabinet AB–ARP–CHU

General elections were held in the Netherlands on 5 July 1922. They were the first elections held under universal suffrage, which became reality after the acceptance of a proposal by Henri Marchant in 1919 that gave women full voting rights. Almost all major parties had a woman elected. The number of female representatives increased from one to seven. Only the Anti-Revolutionary Party principally excluded women from the House of Representatives. Another amendment to the electoral law increased the electoral threshold from 0.5% to 0.75%, after six parties had won seats with less than 0.75% of the vote in the previous elections.

The General League of Roman Catholic Electoral Associations remained the largest party, increasing from 30 to 32 seats, whilst the Anti-Revolutionary Party increased from 13 to 16 seats, and the Christian Historical Union went from 7 to 11 seats. The left-wing Christian Democratic Party and the Christian Social Party both lost their sole seats, disappearing from the House, while the Reformed Political Party (SGP) won a seat. The SGP, an orthodox Protestant party established in 1918, was opposed to the co-operation of the Protestant ARP and CHU with the Catholics.

The Social Democratic Workers' Party lost two seats, whilst left-wing splinter parties also suffered losses, and went from four to two seats. Uniquely, the 1922 general election also fielded the first immigrant candidate to stand for election to the Dutch House of Representatives; Indonesian revolutionary, Tan Malaka. He ran under the Communist Party of Holland's third candidate. Though he did not take the seat.

Several liberal groups had merged in 1921 to form the Liberal State Party, but lost further seats as they were reduced from fifteen to only ten. However, a new Liberal Party led by the 85 year old Samuel van Houten, won a seat. Van Houten himself did not take the seat, which was instead occupied by his representative, Lizzy van Dorp.

The Free-thinking Democratic League maintained, against most expectations, their five seats, whilst of the remaining splinter parties, only the Peasants' League was able to survive, rising from one to two seats.

After a relatively short formation, the second Ruijs de Beerenbrouck cabinet was formed, with largely the same composition as the previous one.

== Results ==
Party or alliance		Votes	%	Seats	+/–
General League		874,745	29.86	32	+2
Social Democratic Workers' Party		567,769	19.38	20	–2
Anti-Revolutionary Party		402,277	13.73	16	+3
Christian; Historical; Union	Christian Historical Union List 2	270,859	9.25	11	+4
Christian; Historical; Union	Christian Historical Union List 1	47,810	1.63	0	0
Christian; Historical; Union	Total	318,669	10.88	11	+4
Liberal; State; Party	Liberal State Party List 1	176,929	6.04	10	New
Liberal; State; Party	Liberal State Party List 2	70,142	2.39	0	0
Liberal; State; Party	Liberal State Party List 3	24,287	0.83	0	0
Liberal; State; Party	Total	271,358	9.26	10	New
Free-thinking Democratic League		134,595	4.59	5	0
Communist Party of the Netherlands		53,664	1.83	2	0
Peasants'; League	Peasants' League (Left)	36,668	1.25	2	+1
Peasants'; League	Peasants' League (Right)	7,871	0.27	0	New
Peasants'; League	Peasants' League (RC)	1,277	0.04	0	New
Peasants'; League	Total	45,816	1.56	2	+1
Liberal; Group	Liberal Party	18,124	0.62	1	New
Liberal; Group	General Welfare Party	9,784	0.33	0	New
Liberal; Group	Braam List	142	0.00	0	New
Liberal; Group	Total	28,050	0.96	1	New
Reformed Political Party		26,744	0.91	1	+1
Christian Democratic Party		20,760	0.71	0	–1
Hervormd Gereformeerde Staatspartij		20,431	0.70	0	New
Christian Social Party		19,540	0.67	0	–1
NBB– Patriciërsbond– Homeowners	Dutch Taxpayers Association	11,238	0.38	0	0
NBB– Patriciërsbond– Homeowners	Patriciërsbond	3,495	0.12	0	New
NBB– Patriciërsbond– Homeowners	Homeowners Party	1,137	0.04	0	New
NBB– Patriciërsbond– Homeowners	Total	15,870	0.54	0	New
Arts Lists		15,830	0.54	0	New
Independent Party		15,227	0.52	0	New
New Catholic Party		13,499	0.46	0	New
Socialist Party		12,411	0.42	0	–1
Rapaille Partij		11,458	0.39	0	New
Rural Party		10,628	0.36	0	New
Democratic Party		9,209	0.31	0	New
Neutral Bloc of the Middle Class		7,963	0.27	0	New
Austerity League		7,456	0.25	0	New
General Dutch Women's Organisation		6,001	0.20	0	New
Van der Zwaag List		3,723	0.13	0	0
Artists' Party		3,499	0.12	0	New
Christian People's Party		2,061	0.07	0	New
Groenendaal List		1,902	0.06	0	New
Land Party		1,384	0.05	0	0
Free Thinkers		1,123	0.04	0	New
Coppenolle List		1,061	0.04	0	New
Kiesvereniging Algemeen Belang		741	0.03	0	New
Party for Pension Interests		588	0.02	0	New
Free Middle Class Party		577	0.02	0	New
Bleeker List		548	0.02	0	New
Small Middle Class Party		544	0.02	0	New
Van der Werf List		544	0.02	0	New
Patriotic Party		354	0.01	0	New
Verweij List		291	0.01	0	New
De Ruyter List		194	0.01	0	New
Brinkman List		167	0.01	0	New
Revolutionary Party		142	0.00	0	New
Schouten List		89	0.00	0	New
Busch List		67	0.00	0	New
Total		2,929,569	100.00	100	0
Source: Kiesraad

== See also ==
- List of candidates in the 1922 Dutch general election
