= Hervormd Gereformeerde Staatspartij =

Former Dutch political party

The Hervormd Gereformeerde Staatspartij (in English: Reformed Reformed State Party), HGS) was an orthodox Protestant political party in the Netherlands during the interwar period. For its orthodox political ideals and its refusal to cooperate in any cabinet, the party is called a testimonial party.

== Party history ==
The HGS was founded in 1921. Many of the founders had been members of the Christian Historical Union (CHU). The party's support for female suffrage and the Catholic/Protestant Coalition were important reasons to create the HGS. The direct cause was a series of demonstrations held in Amsterdam by orthodox Protestants, who opposed the lifting of the ban on Catholic processions in the Northern provinces. The movement called itself the June Movement, in reference to the April movement of 1853 which had been crucial to the development of Christian democracy in the Netherlands. A driving force in the creation of the new party was the minister Casper Lingbeek.

The party contested the 1925 general election and won one seat, which was taken by Lingbeek. The election was turbulent because the cabinet led by Charles Ruijs de Beerenbrouck had fallen over the diplomatic mission of the Netherlands to the Holy See, an issue that had divided Catholics and Protestants. In the 1929 general election, the party retained its seat. In 1931 Lingbeek stood down in favour of Peereboom. In the 1933 general election, Lingbeek was asked to return to parliament by his supporters. In the 1930s, the party was methodically isolated by other Protestant parties. The appeal of the ARP's strongman Hendrikus Colijn, who promised to end the economic crisis, on the party's electorate as well as the appeal of the National Socialist Movement in the Netherlands among prominent party members, caused the party's downfall. The party also lacked a strong pillarized organization around it. It was unable to win a seat in the 1937 general election.

After World War II, former members of the HGS founded the Protestant Union, with several former members of the CHU. It contested the 1946 general election but was unable to win any seats. It continued to exist as a study club until the 1980s.

== Name ==
The party's name, Hervormd Gereformeerde Staatspartij, is rather difficult to translate because it refers to two Protestant denominations, the mainstream Dutch Reformed Church (Nederlands Hervormde Kerk, whence Hervormd), and the Reformed Churches in the Netherlands (Gereformeerde Kerken Nederland, whence Gereformeerd). It sought to unite these two denominations in one national Protestant church. The party called itself a "state party" (staatspartij) because it sought to represented the general interest and not some partial interest. The acronym was taken by the party's founders to also mean Hoor Gods Stem ("Hear God's Voice").

== Ideology and issues ==
The HGS was an orthodox Protestant party with a strong nationalist tendency, based on two core ideas: virulent anti-Catholicism and theocracy.

The party wanted to, in their view, return the Netherlands to its original form: a Protestant nation, based on principles of the Bible. It identified heavily with the Geuzen, the Protestant resistance movement which was crucial in Eighty Years' War against the Catholic Spaniards. The HGS feared the emancipation of the Dutch Catholics, because it saw Catholicism as a false religion and feared that the Catholics might try to take over the country. The party saw the 1886 Dutch Reformed Church split as a historic mistake as it weakened the power of the Protestant part of the population.

In its manifesto of principles, it explained their view on the Ten Commandments. The first commandment ("Thou shalt have no other gods before Me...") was interpreted as a rejection of the false gods of Plutos (capitalism), Demos (democracy) and Ochlos (socialism). The party rejected both socialism and strikes as a political tool, and capitalism and exploitation. Both in their view were in contradiction with the eighth commandment ("Thou shalt not steal").

Practically, this meant that the party was opposed to government control of society, including compulsory voting, compulsory vaccination, and social security.

== Representation ==
This table shows the results of the HGS in elections to the House of Representatives and Senate, as well as the party's political leadership: the parliamentary leader and the lead candidate; these posts are normally taken by the party's leader.

Year	HoR	S	Lead candidate	Parliamentary leader
1925	1	0	Casper Lingbeek	Casper Lingbeek
1926	1	0	no elections	Casper Lingbeek
1927	1	0	no elections	Casper Lingbeek
1928	1	0	no elections	Casper Lingbeek
1929	1	0	Casper Lingbeek	Casper Lingbeek
1930	1	0	no elections	Casper Lingbeek
1930	1	0	no elections	Casper Lingbeek
1931	1	0	no elections	Casper Lingbeek
1932	1	0	no elections	Bate Peereboom
1933	1	0	no elections	Casper Lingbeek
1934	1	0	no elections	Casper Lingbeek
1935	1	0	no elections	Casper Lingbeek
1936	1	0	no elections	Casper Lingbeek

=== Municipal and provincial government ===
The party also held one to two seats in the Provincial Council of South Holland and municipal councils in cities like The Hague, Arnhem and Vianen.

== Electorate ==
Support for the HGS was religiously based. Many of the party's supporters came from by the Confessional Union, the orthodox wing of the Dutch Reformed Church.

== Linked organisations ==
The party's youth movement was called the Jonge Geuzen (Young Beggars). Its bi-weekly periodical was the State and Church.

== Relations to other parties ==
The HGS was methodically isolated, and isolated itself. Because of its anti-Catholicism it was opposed to the Catholic Roman Catholic State Party. It was also opposed to the liberalism of the Liberal State Party and the socialism of the Social Democratic Workers' Party. The CHU and to a lesser extent the ARP were reminded by the party of their original ideals, but they rejected the HGS' ideological orthodoxy.

== Bibliography ==
- Vossen, Koenraad (2003). Vrij vissen in het Vondelpark: kleine politieke partijen in Nederland 1918 - 1940. Amsterdam: Wereldbibliotheek. ISBN 978-90-284-2009-0.
