= David van Embden =

Dutch politician (1875–1962)

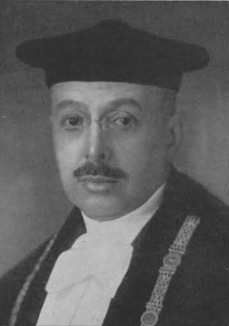
David van Embden

David van Embden (October 22, 1875, The Hague – February 14, 1962, Amsterdam), was a Dutch politician, first for the Free-thinking Democratic League (VDB), later for the Labour Party (PvdA).

He studied law at the municipal university of Amsterdam and in 1901, he graduated cum laude. Raised in the Portuguese Jewish community in the Netherlands, in 1905 he married a Christian. From 1905 to 1941 he was professor of economics and statistics at the municipal university of Amsterdam.

From 1905 he was a party worker for the VDB in the House of Representatives. From 1910 to 1916 he was a member of the Provincial Council of North Holland for the district of Amsterdam. From 1918 to 1946 he was member of the Senate. His sister was also a member of parliament for the VDB at that time. His pacifism was strongly influenced by his religious convictions and he was a proponent of national disarmament. He also advocated decolonisation, and progressive social and economic programmes.

After the Germans invaded the Netherlands on May 10, 1940 in World War II, Van Embden fled during the night of 13–14 May 1940 to the United Kingdom. After the war, in 1946, he returned to the Netherlands and joined the Labour Party (PvdA). He also became a member of the party's governing board for Amsterdam-Oost.

Van Embden also resumed his professorship. He died in 1962.
