= Roman Catholic People's Party =

Political party in the Netherlands

The Roman Catholic People's Party (Dutch: Roomsch-katholieke Volkspartij, RKVP) was a Social Catholic political party in the Netherlands. The RKVP played a marginal role in Dutch politics.

== History ==
The RKVP was founded in 1923 by Pius Arts. In the 1925 general election, the party won one seat which was taken by Arts. In the 1929 general election, the party lost its seat. In the 1933 general election, the party regained one seat. In the same year, the party merged with the Catholic Democratic League to form the Catholic Democratic Party. In 1939 this party merged with the Roman Catholic State Party, the larger, centrist, Catholic party.

== Ideology and issues ==
The RKVP combined a conservative Catholic stance on ethical issues with a progressive, left-wing stance on economic issues.

It advocated the interest of Catholic workers and sought just taxation and a strong influence of labour unions in companies. It wanted to increase support for large families as well as price controls. The party was in favour of private home ownership and lower rents. It also supported national disarmament.

In ethical issues, it was as conservative as the Roman Catholic State Party, the larger, centrist, Catholic party. It advocated the re-institution of the envoy at the Holy See and an end to the ban on processions.

== Leadership and support ==
This table shows the RKVP's results in elections to the House of Representatives and Senate, as well as the party's political leadership: the parliamentary leader and the lead candidate in general elections; these posts are normally taken by the party's leader.

Year	HoR	S	Lead candidate	Parliamentary leader
1925	1	0	Pius Arts	Pius Arts
1926	1	0	no election	Pius Arts
1927	1	0	no election	Pius Arts
1928	1	0	no election	Pius Arts
1929	0	0	Pius Arts	extra-parliamentary
1930	0	0	no election	extra-parliamentary
1931	0	0	no election	extra-parliamentary
1932	0	0	no election	extra-parliamentary
1933	1	0	Pius Arts	Pius Arts
1934	1	0	no election	Pius Arts
1935	1	0	no election	Pius Arts
1936	1	0	no election	Pius Arts

== Electorate ==
The party drew most its support from Catholic workers from the region around Tiel, Arts' home town.
