= 1918 Dutch general election =

- 3 July 1918
- All 100 seats in the House of Representatives; 51 seats needed for a majority
Party	Leader	Vote %	Seats	+/–
AB	Willem Hubert Nolens	29.97	30	+5
SDAP	Pieter Jelles Troelstra	22.03	22	+7
ARP	Abraham Kuyper	13.36	13	+2
CHU	Alexander de Savornin Lohman	6.55	7	−2
LU	Eduard Ellis van Raalte	6.19	6	−15
VDB	Henri Marchant	5.33	5	−3
BVL	Alibert Cornelis Visser van IJzendoorn	3.81	4	−6
EB	Willem Treub	3.13	3	New
SDP	David Wijnkoop	2.31	2	+2
MP	Abraham Staalman	0.94	1	New
CDP	Andries Staalman	0.79	1	+1
PB	Frederik Bos	0.67	1	New
SP	Harm Kolthek	0.67	1	New
BCS	Willy Kruyt	0.63	1	New
CSP	Adolf Robbert van de Laar	0.61	1	New
NP	Henri ter Hall	0.53	1	New
VDW	Willem Wijk	0.51	1	New
This lists parties that won seats. See the complete results below.
Most voted-for party by municipality
Cabinet before	Cabinet after
Cort van der Linden cabinet Liberal	First Ruijs de Beerenbrouck cabinet AB–ARP–CHU

General elections were held in the Netherlands on 3 July 1918. They were the first elections held after a series of reforms that introduced universal male suffrage and pure proportional representation, replacing the previous two-round system in single member constituencies. This change was known as the Pacification of 1917, which also included the introduction of state financing of religious schools, and led to the start of consociational democracy.

The change in the electoral system led to major changes in the political makeup of the House of Representatives. The confessional right-wing parties, the General League of Roman Catholic Electoral Associations, the Anti-Revolutionary Party and the Christian Historical Union, together won 50 seats.

The liberal parties lost the most seats. While in 1917, two of the liberal parties, the Liberal Union and the League of Free Liberals, had won 31 seats, they were now reduced to 10 seats. Together with three smaller liberal parties, liberals now held only 15 seats in the House of representatives.

The fragmentation of the House was caused by the low electoral threshold of just 0.5%, with the smallest party, the Alliance to Democratise the Forces, managing to win a seat with only 6,828 votes.

The elections were the first in which Dutch women could stand for election, despite still not being allowed to vote. Suze Groeneweg was elected as the first female member of the House of Representatives.

== Results ==
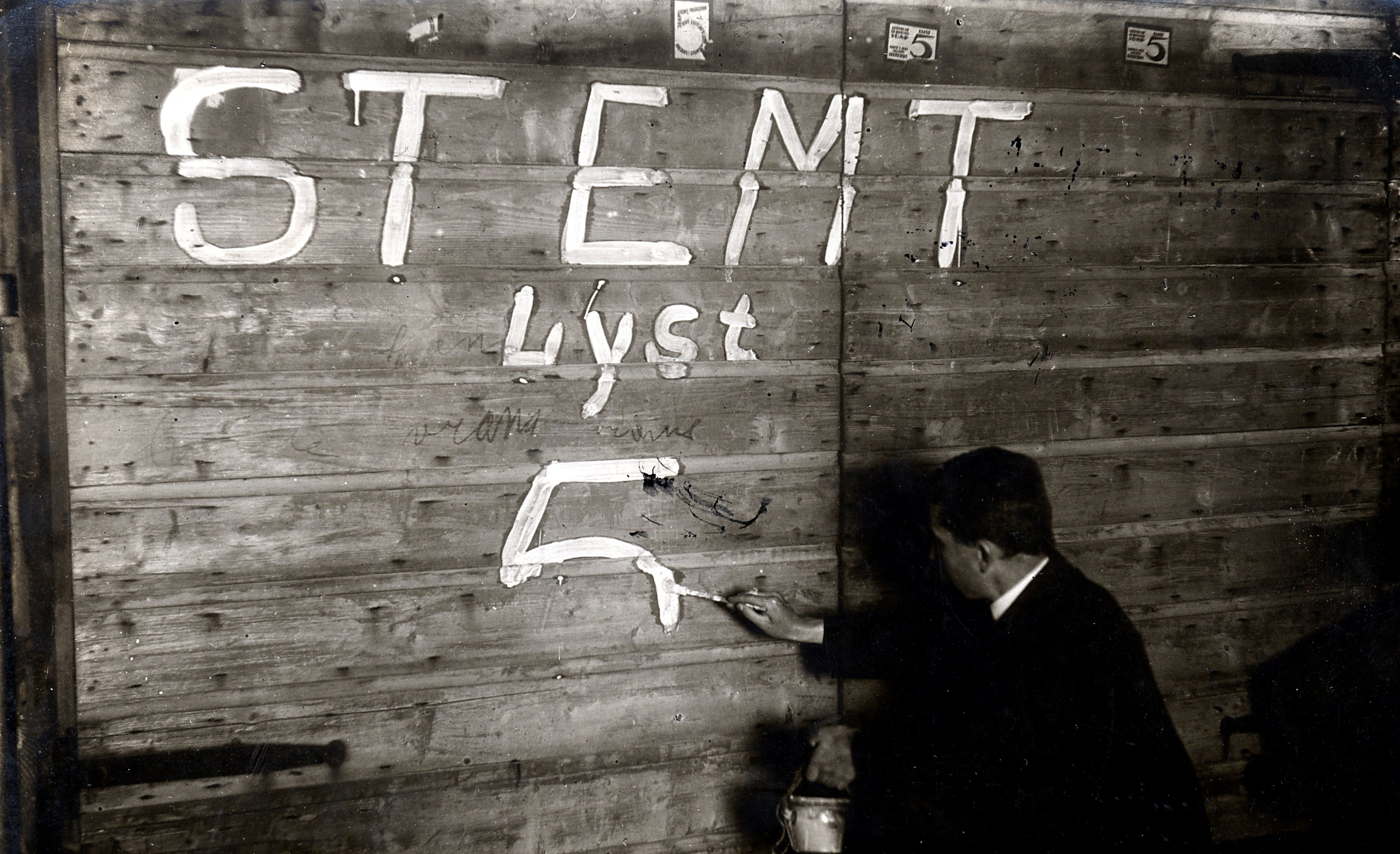
A man writing political slogans on a wooden fence in Amsterdam

Party	Votes	%	Seats	+/–
General League	402,908	29.97	30	+5
Social Democratic Workers' Party	296,145	22.03	22	+7
Anti-Revolutionary Party	179,523	13.36	13	+2
Christian Historical Union	87,983	6.55	7	–2
Liberal Union	83,173	6.19	6	–15
Free-thinking Democratic League	71,582	5.33	5	–3
League of Free Liberals	51,195	3.81	4	–6
Economic League	42,042	3.13	3	New
Social Democratic Party	31,043	2.31	2	+2
Middle Class Party	12,663	0.94	1	New
Christian Democratic Party	10,653	0.79	1	New
Peasants' League	9,068	0.67	1	New
Socialist Party	8,950	0.67	1	New
League of Christian Socialists	8,416	0.63	1	+1
Christian Social Party	8,152	0.61	1	New
Neutral Party	7,186	0.53	1	New
Alliance to Democratise the Forces	6,830	0.51	1	New
General State Party	6,713	0.50	0	0
Police Party	6,189	0.46	0	New
Reformed Political Party	5,179	0.39	0	New
General Liberal Party	2,691	0.20	0	New
Van der Zwaag Group	2,649	0.20	0	New
Alberda Group	735	0.05	0	New
Kuiper Group	568	0.04	0	New
Amsterdamese Police and Firefighting Party	417	0.03	0	New
National League of Protestant Voters	358	0.03	0	New
People's Welfare Party	301	0.02	0	New
Neutral and Colonial League	237	0.02	0	New
People's Party	236	0.02	0	New
Stoffel Group	235	0.02	0	New
Braam Group	189	0.01	0	New
Total	1,344,209	100.00	100	0
Registered voters/turnout	1,517,380	–		
Source: CBS, Nohlen & Stöver
