= 1925 Dutch general election =

- 1 July 1925
- All 100 seats in the House of Representatives; 51 seats needed for a majority
- Turnout: 91.35%
Party	Leader	Vote %	Seats	+/–
General League	Willem Hubert Nolens	28.63	30	−2
SDAP	Pieter Jelles Troelstra	22.90	24	+4
ARP	Hendrikus Colijn	12.23	13	−3
CHU	Johannes Theodoor de Visser	9.90	11	0
LSP	Hendrik Coenraad Dresselhuijs	8.74	9	−1
VDB	Henri Marchant	6.07	7	+2
SGP	Gerrit Hendrik Kersten	2.03	2	+1
PB	Arend Braat	1.42	1	−1
CPH	David Wijnkoop	1.19	1	−1
RKVP	Pius Arts	1.19	1	New
HGSP	Casper Andries Lingbeek	0.98	1	+1
This lists parties that won seats. See the complete results below.
Cabinet before	Cabinet after
Second Ruijs de Beerenbrouck cabinet AB–ARP–CHU	First Colijn cabinet AB–ARP–CHU

General elections were held in the Netherlands on 1 July 1925. The General League of Roman Catholic Electoral Associations remained the largest party in the House of Representatives, winning 30 of the 100 seats.

== Results ==
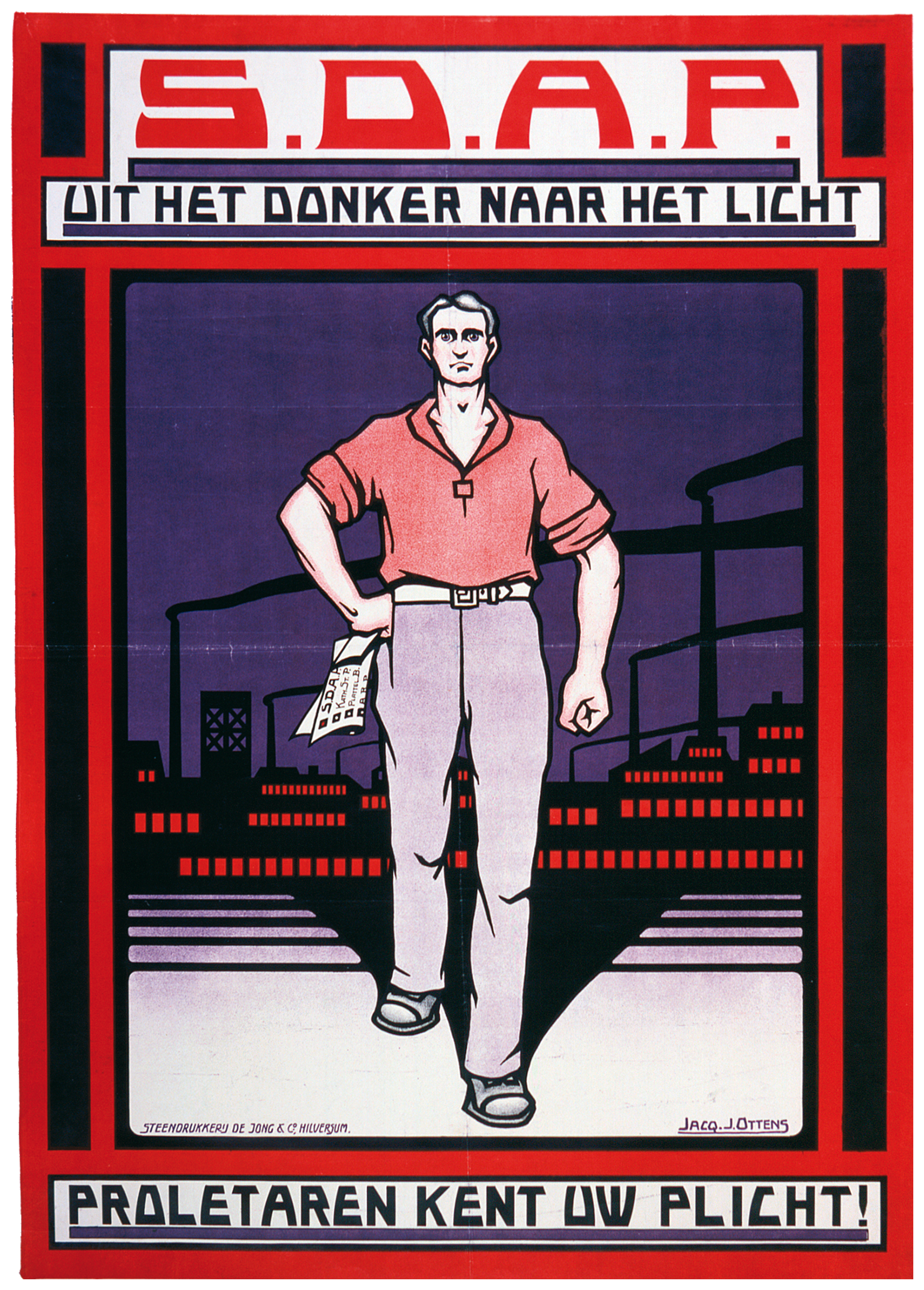
A 1925 SDAP election poster

Party	Votes	%	Seats	+/–
General League	883,333	28.63	30	–2
Social Democratic Workers' Party	706,689	22.90	24	+4
Anti-Revolutionary Party	377,426	12.23	13	–3
Christian Historical Union	305,587	9.90	11	0
Liberal State Party	269,564	8.74	9	–1
Free-thinking Democratic League	187,183	6.07	7	+2
Reformed Political Party	62,513	2.03	2	+1
Peasants' League	43,877	1.42	1	–1
Communist Party Holland	36,770	1.19	1	–1
Roman Catholic People's Party	36,571	1.19	1	New
Hervormd Gereformeerde Staatspartij	30,258	0.98	1	+1
Middle Class Party	23,176	0.75	0	0
Peasants' League–De Boer	18,762	0.61	0	New
Protestant People's Party	15,499	0.50	0	0
Christian Democratic Federation	13,944	0.45	0	0
Revolutionary Work Committee	12,655	0.41	0	New
Patriotic Party	12,597	0.41	0	0
Socialist Party	11,790	0.38	0	0
Democratic Party	11,102	0.36	0	0
Rapaille Partij	4,697	0.15	0	0
Austerity League	4,655	0.15	0	0
Sport Party	4,402	0.14	0	New
Free Thinkers	3,649	0.12	0	0
Union of Actualists	2,253	0.07	0	New
Party for Pension Interests	1,945	0.06	0	0
Land Party	1,868	0.06	0	0
Agricultural Party	1,150	0.04	0	New
New National Party	757	0.02	0	New
Union for Contributory State Pension	556	0.02	0	0
Wild Party	294	0.01	0	New
Rentetrekkers	206	0.01	0	New
Free-thinkers Christian Party	134	0.00	0	New
Total	3,085,862	100.00	100	0
Valid votes	3,085,862	95.34		
Invalid/blank votes	150,729	4.66		
Total votes	3,236,591	100.00		
Registered voters/turnout	3,543,058	91.35		
Source: CBS, Nederlandse verkiezingsuitslagen

== See also ==
- List of candidates in the 1925 Dutch general election
