= Middle Class Party =

The Middenstandspartij (in Dutch: Middenstandspartij, MP) was a Dutch political party representing middle class interests. It played only a marginal role in Dutch politics.

== Party History ==
The MP was founded by Abraham Staalman, a businessman from Amsterdam. Staalman sought to create the equivalent of the working class SDAP for the middle class and small business owners, who he saw as being crushed between big business and large department stores one the one hand and "tyrannical socialist" cooperatives on the other.

The 1918 elections were the first election in the Netherlands which used a system of proportional representation. With about 12,500 votes (0.94% of the votes) the MP won one seat, as did several other one or two person parties. After the elections the election law became more restrictive. Between 1918 and 1921, the MP cooperated in the neutral parliamentary party, with four other one or two seat parties, namely the Peasants' League, the Economic League, the Neutral Party and the Alliance to Democratise the Forces. The parliamentary party was led by former minister Willem Treub. In 1921 several of these parties, including the Middle Class Party merged into the Liberal State Party, together with two larger liberal parties.

The Middle Class Party continued as an independent part of this new party, with a separate list for the elections (some times combined with the Neutral Party). In 1929, this special position was abolished and Staalman left the Liberal State Party to found the Middle Party for City and Country, which won one seat in the 1929 elections. In 1971, the New Middle Party entered in the elections, which saw itself as a continuation of the Middle Class Party.

== Ideology & Issues ==
The MP was a typical special interest party. Its main goal was to represent the interests of the middle class, those "stuck between the proletariat and capital". It advocated progressive taxation, reduced government interference and bureaucracy, recognition of employers' organizations and equal pension-rights for businessmen and workers. The MP supported a small state, with government intervention only warranted to remedy unfair competition.

== Leadership & Support ==
This table show the MP's results in elections to the House of Representatives and Senate, as well as the party's political leadership. The fractievoorzitter, is the chair of the parliamentary party and the lijsttrekker is the party's top candidate in the general election; these posts are normally taken by the party's leader.

Year	HoR	S	Lijsttrekker	Fractievoorzitter
1918	1	0	Abraham Staalman	Abraham Staalman
1919	1	0	no elections	Abraham Staalman
1920	1	0	no elections	Abraham Staalman

== Electorate ==
The party drew most of its support from Amsterdam, where Abraham Staal was a well-known figure, and which provided a quarter of the party's votes in the 1918 Dutch general election.The party also had a seat in the city's municipal council.
