= Amsterdamese Police and Firefighting Party =

Amsterdamese Police and Firefighting Party (in Dutch: Amsterdamsche Politie- en Brandweerpartij) was a political party in the Netherlands. The party contested the 1918 parliamentary election in the constituencies of Amsterdam and Arnhem with a one-man list consisting of Renze van der Meulen. Demands of the party included an abolition of the hunting law, an introduction of a law for civil servants, and a ban on food exports until 1919.

The party obtained just 417 votes (0.03%). It got 0.34% in Arnhem and 0.14% in Amsterdam.

Van der Meulen would later launch the National Party for Pension Interests (Landelijke Partij voorPensioenbelangen).
