= Frederik Bos =

Dutch politician

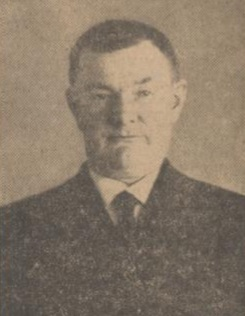
F. Bos

Frederik Bos (28 May 1866, Usselo, Overijssel – 11 June 1931, Twekkelo) was a Dutch politician. He was a member of the House of Representatives from 17 September 1918 to 16 September 1919 as a member of the Peasants' League.
