= 1933 Dutch general election =

- 26 April 1933
- All 100 seats in the House of Representatives; 51 seats needed for a majority
- Turnout: 94.22% (▲4.61pp)
Party	Leader	Vote %	Seats	+/–
RKSP	Piet Aalberse	27.87	28	−2
SDAP	Johan Willem Albarda	21.46	22	−2
ARP	Hendrikus Colijn	13.43	14	+2
CHU	Dirk Jan de Geer	9.13	10	−1
LSP	Dirk Fock	6.95	7	−1
VDB	Dolf Joekes	5.08	6	−1
CPH	Louis de Visser	3.18	4	+2
SGP	Gerrit Hendrik Kersten	2.51	3	0
RSP	Henk Sneevliet	1.30	1	+1
NBTMP	Cornelis Vervoorn & Arend Braat	1.28	1	0
RKVP	Pius Arts	1.10	1	+1
CDU	Harm van Houten	1.03	1	+1
HGS	Casper Andries Lingbeek	0.91	1	0
VNH	Cornelis Jacobus Snijders	0.81	1	New
This lists parties that won seats. See the complete results below.
Most voted-for party by municipality
Cabinet before	Cabinet after
Third Ruijs de Beerenbrouck cabinet RKSP–ARP–CHU	Second Colijn cabinet RKSP–ARP–CHU–LSP–VDB

General elections were held in the Netherlands on 26 April 1933. The Roman Catholic State Party remained the largest party in the House of Representatives, winning 28 of the 100 seats.

== Results ==
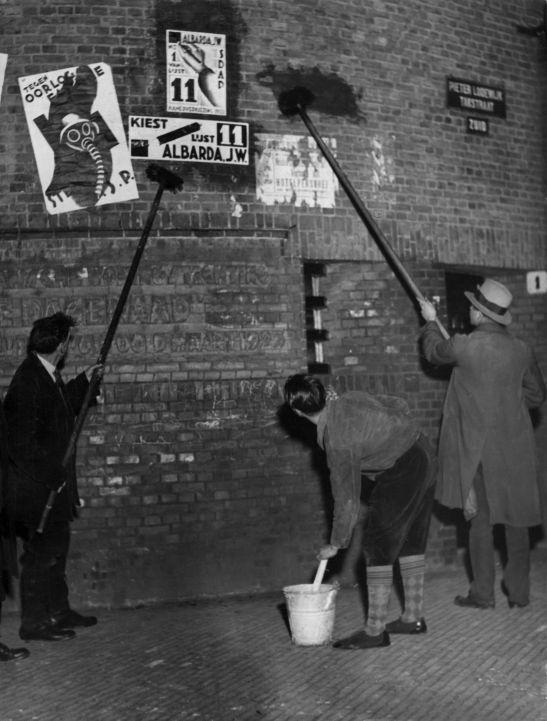
Men putting up election posters

Party	Votes	%	Seats	+/–
Roman Catholic State Party	1,037,364	27.87	28	–2
Social Democratic Workers' Party	798,632	21.46	22	–2
Anti-Revolutionary Party	499,892	13.43	14	+2
Christian Historical Union	339,809	9.13	10	–1
Liberal State Party	258,732	6.95	7	–1
Free-thinking Democratic League	188,952	5.08	6	–1
Communist Party Holland	118,238	3.18	4	+2
Reformed Political Party	93,274	2.51	3	0
Revolutionary Socialist Party	48,405	1.30	1	+1
National Farmers' Horticulturists' and Middle Class Party	47,688	1.28	1	0
Roman Catholic People's Party	40,904	1.10	1	+1
Christian Democratic Union	38,464	1.03	1	+1
Hervormd Gereformeerde Staatspartij	33,930	0.91	1	0
Alliance for National Reconstruction	30,332	0.81	1	New
Independent Socialist Party	27,470	0.74	0	New
Catholic Democratic League	20,405	0.55	0	New
General Dutch Fascist League	17,157	0.46	0	New
General Democratic Union	14,567	0.39	0	New
Nationaal Verbond Plicht, Orde, Recht	11,162	0.30	0	New
Christian Workers Party	6,787	0.18	0	0
Union of Nationalists	6,449	0.17	0	0
Limburg Federation	6,358	0.17	0	–
Roman Catholic Labour Party	6,202	0.17	0	New
Justice and Freedom	4,267	0.11	0	New
Market Traders	3,184	0.09	0	New
Wolswinkel List	3,062	0.08	0	New
Independent Businessmen	2,422	0.07	0	New
National Socialist Party	2,127	0.06	0	New
Dutch Fascist Union	1,771	0.05	0	New
Jacobs List	1,629	0.04	0	New
RK Bouwvakarbeiders	1,330	0.04	0	New
Eijking List	1,180	0.03	0	New
Handeldrijvende Middenstand	1,123	0.03	0	New
Dutch League of Taxpayers	940	0.03	0	New
General Welfare Party	892	0.02	0	0
Main and Manual Workers	763	0.02	0	0
New Socialist Party	746	0.02	0	New
Engels List	725	0.02	0	New
National Union of Labour Interest	551	0.01	0	New
De Wit List	510	0.01	0	New
For General Welfare	517	0.01	0	New
Bongers List	473	0.01	0	New
Zuiderzee Party	338	0.01	0	New
General Dutch Tenants' League	294	0.01	0	New
Orange Fascists	261	0.01	0	New
Universal Party	237	0.01	0	New
National Workmen's Party	227	0.01	0	New
Anti-Crisis Party	197	0.01	0	New
Triesscheijn List	193	0.01	0	New
Proletarian Group	185	0.00	0	New
Central Democratic Labour Party	182	0.00	0	New
Building and Reconciliation	142	0.00	0	New
General Workers' League	97	0.00	0	New
Groothuis List	90	0.00	0	New
Total	3,721,828	100.00	100	0
Valid votes	3,721,828	95.44		
Invalid/blank votes	177,827	4.56		
Total votes	3,899,655	100.00		
Registered voters/turnout	4,126,490	94.50		
Source: CBS, Nohlen & Stöver
