= Free-thinking Democratic League =

Free-thinking Democratic League Vrijzinnig Democratische Bond
- Abbreviation: VDB
- Founded: 17 March 1901
- Dissolved: 9 February 1946
- Merger of: Radical League left-wing of the Liberal Union
- Merged into: Labour Party
- Ideology: Social liberalism Radicalism
- Political position: Centre-left
- International affiliation: Radical International

The Free-thinking Democratic League (Dutch: Vrijzinnig Democratische Bond, VDB) was a progressive liberal political party in the Netherlands. Established in 1901, it played a relatively large role in Dutch politics, supplying one Prime Minister, Wim Schermerhorn. The League is a predecessor of two of the major Dutch political parties, the conservative liberal People's Party for Freedom and Democracy (VVD) and the social democratic Labour Party (PvdA). The social liberal Democrats 66 also claims an ideological connection with the VDB.

== Name ==
Like some other liberal parties in Europe, such as the Free Democratic Party of Switzerland, the party did not have the word "liberal" in its name because of its connotation with conservative liberalism. Instead it used the term vrijzinnig, which is difficult to translate into English. The term, which literally translated would be "free-thinking" or "free-minded" has meanings in the Protestant church referring to more liberal or latitudinarian tendencies in the church, rather than secular freethought, as well as more progressive and social tendencies in liberalism, as opposed to classical liberalism.

The term "Democratic" is included in the parties name because of its clear commitment to further democratisation of the Dutch political system. The term "League" is used instead of "Party" because the organisation was not a centralised, strictly organised mass party but rather a loose league of politicians and local caucuses. In liberal circles parties were seen as factionalist and incompatible with the common good.

== History ==
=== Background ===
The VDB was a merger of two groups; one, the Radical League, was founded in 1892 as an Amsterdam secession of the Liberal Union; they left the Union over the issue of universal suffrage. The second group was the Free-thinking Democratic political club (Dutch: Vrijzinnig Democratische Kamerclub or VD-kamerclub). This was a club of Liberal Union MPs (in 1901, it had about 25 members, out of 35 Liberal Union MPs and 100 MPs in total). The second group left the Union over the same matter. In 1901, the board of the Liberal Union, supported by the VD-kamerclub, proposed that all its candidates would stand on a platform of universal suffrage. The party congress rejected this proposal. In reaction to this the party's board, some of the members of the VD-kamerclub, and some of the party caucuses left the party.

=== Founding and early history ===
The two groups, the Radical League and the VD-kamerclub, merged in 1901 to form the Free-minded Democratic League. In the 1901 elections they won nine seats. The party always remained rather small, but because of its strategic position and the quality of its MPs, the party was very influential.

Although the VDB had split from the Liberal Union and the other liberal split, the League of Free Liberals, was against universal suffrage, they still needed each other to form a liberal alternative to the Christian democratic Coalition. In many districts there was only one liberal candidate supported by all three liberal parties.

In 1905, the VDB won two additional seats. From 1905 to 1908 the Liberal Union and the VDB formed a liberal minority cabinet led by Theo de Meester. The cabinet was supported by Social Democratic Workers' Party (SDAP). In the 1909 election, the Coalition regained its majority. The VDB lost two seats, making its total nine. In the 1913 election the Christian democrats lost their majority. The VDB lost four seats, because it was not the only liberal party in favour of universal suffrage; the Liberal Union and the League of Free Liberals had also included in their programmes. Furthermore, the SDAP performed exceptionally well in these elections. The leader of the VDB, Dirk Bos, attempted to form a government with the liberals, free liberals, socialists and free-thinking democrats. The socialists refused to cooperate, because one of their major issues (unilateral disarmament of the Netherlands) could not be realised. A liberal extra-parliamentary cabinet was formed, led by Pieter Cort van der Linden. It implemented universal suffrage and proportional representation.

During this cabinet, a conflict between the VDB parliamentary party and minister Willem Treub led to his resignation. Treub left the party and founded the Economic League, which would merge with the Liberal Union to form the Liberal State Party.

=== Interwar years ===
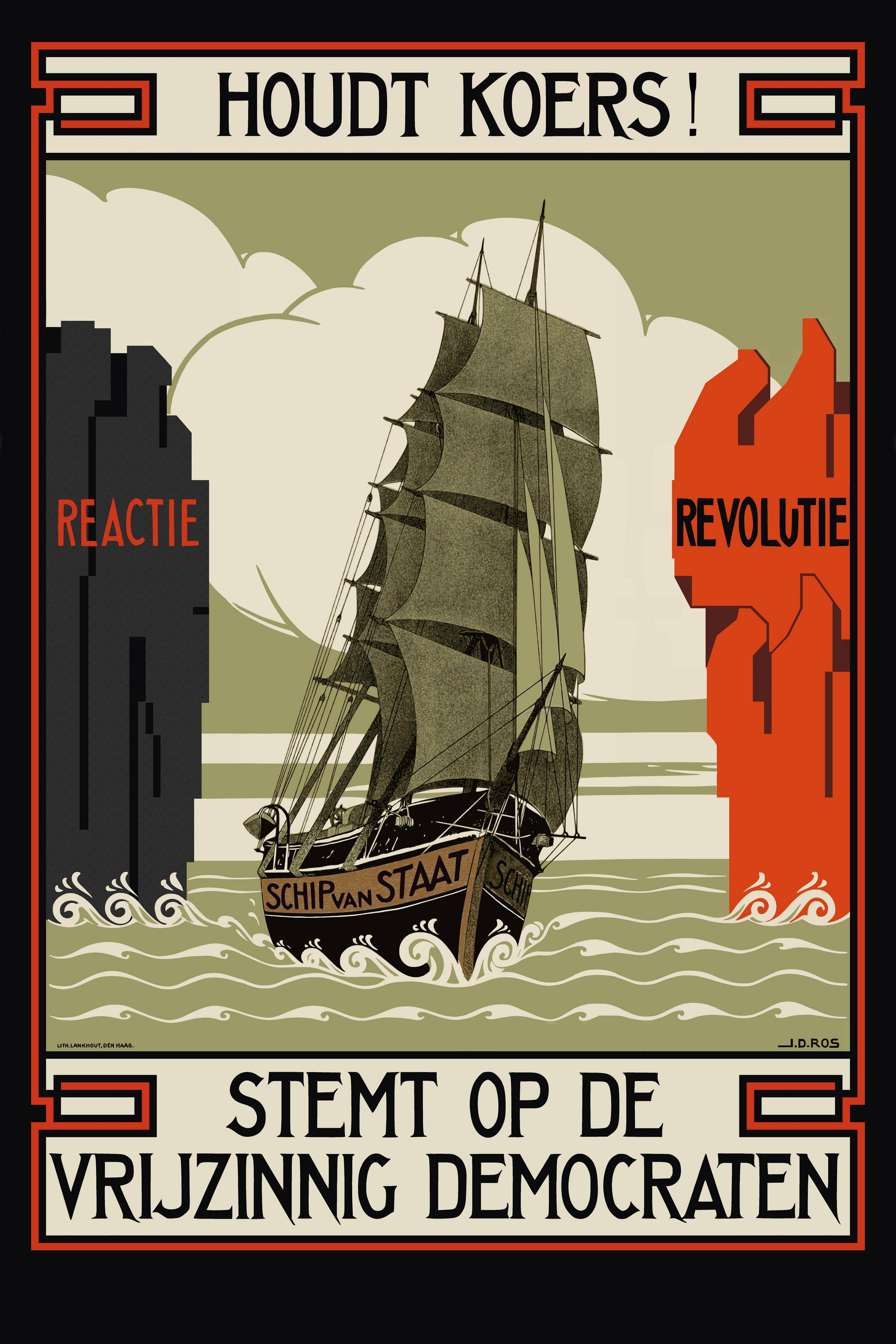
1922 poster created by the VDB. "Houdt Koers" means "Hold Firm". In the image the "Ship of State" avoids smashing on the rocks of revolution and reaction.

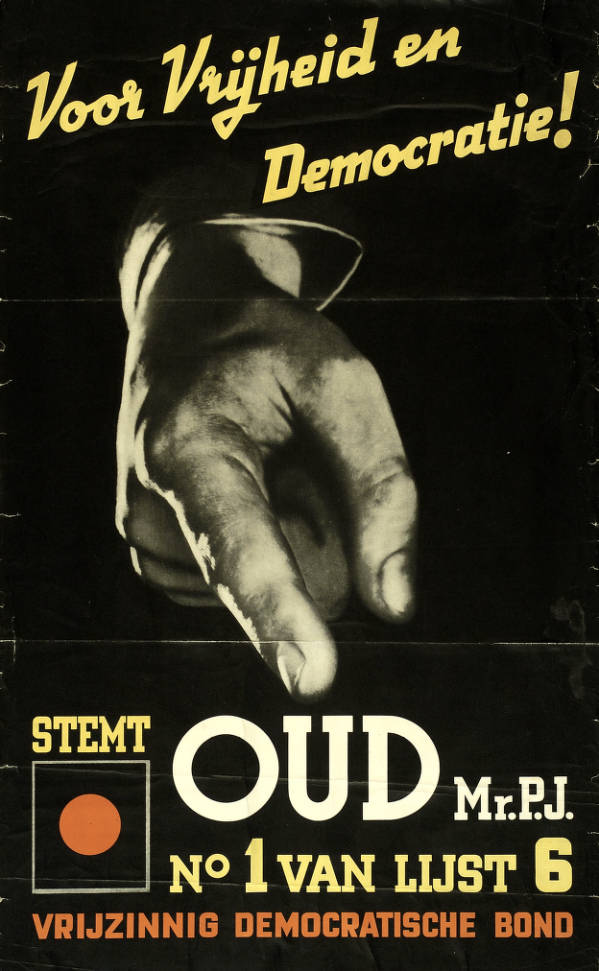
1937 poster created by the VDB, declaring a vote for the VDB is "a vote for Freedom and Democracy"

In the 1918 elections, with universal suffrage and proportional representation in place, the liberal alliance lost nearly half its seats. The VDB remains relatively stable with five seats, but they were nonetheless forced to a position in opposition to a Christian democratic cabinet. In 1919, however, VDB leader Henri Marchant initiated the law for female suffrage. In the 1922 elections the party retained its five seats. Betsy Bakker-Nort became the party's first female member of the House of Representatives.

In 1925, the party was instrumental in the fall of the cabinet led by Hendrikus Colijn: each year the orthodox Protestant Reformed Political Party (SGP) proposed that the Dutch representation at the Holy See be removed. The Protestant SGP was fervently anti-Catholic. This proposal was always supported by the Protestant Christian Historical Union (CHU), which was part of the Catholic–Protestant cabinet, but nonetheless had an anti-Catholic history. For the Catholic leader Nolens, this Papal representation was of utmost importance. In 1925 the VDB had convinced the other opposition parties that this was their chance to let the government fall and create a progressive cabinet. The entire opposition voted with the SGP and CHU, and the cabinet fell. In the following 1925 election the party gained two seats. The party leader, Henri Marchant, attempted to form a progressive government with the Roman Catholic State Party (RKSP), the SDAP and the VDB. He failed, however, and a new Christian democratic cabinet was formed.

In the 1929 election, the VDB retained its seven seats. In 1933, the party lost one seat. Nonetheless, the party was asked to cooperate in the centre-right government led by Colijn, which consisted of the Catholic RKSP, the Protestant CHU and ARP, and the liberal VDB and Liberal State Party. The VDB cooperated in the budget cuts and the strengthening of the Dutch armed forces. The previously good relations with the SDAP came under considerable strain from this. In 1933 the party's leader, Marchant, who also served as minister of Education, stepped down after his secret conversion to Catholicism. Pieter Oud took his place as political leader of the VDB, until he became major of Rotterdam in 1938. In 1937, they managed to retain their seven seats. In 1941, the party was forbidden by the German occupying force. The VDB played a minor role in the 1940–1945 cabinets in exile.

=== Dissolution ===
After the German occupation, there was a widespread feeling that a new political party was necessary, one that was not part of the pillarised system. This movement was called the Breakthrough. Willem Schermerhorn became the first Prime Minister after World War II. He led a cabinet composed out of progressives of all parties. In 1946 the VDB merged with the Social Democratic Workers' Party and the progressive Christian Democratic Union (CDU) to form the modern-day Labour Party (PvdA). However, this party soon strengthened its ties to democratic socialist organisations. In 1948, a group dissatisfied with the failed "Breakthrough" and the increasingly socialist tint of the PvdA left the party. These were all former VDB members, led by former VDB leader Pieter Oud. They joined with the conservative liberal Freedom Party (PvdV) to form the People's Party for Freedom and Democracy.

== Ideology ==
The VDB started out as a left, social or progressive liberal party, committed to universal suffrage and the construction of a welfare state. It favoured the democratisation of the Dutch political system. Female suffrage was one of its most important issues. It favoured government influence in the national economy by nationalising crucial industries. It also believed that government should play an important part in ensuring the welfare of the population; hence, it favoured the implementation of state pensions for the elderly.

In the 1930s, the leader of the party, Pieter Oud, was somewhat more conservative than his predecessors, at least fiscally, supporting as Minister of Finance the strict fiscally conservative line of the Cabinet.

Before World War I, it favoured an army formed by national conscription. After the war and until the 1930s, it favoured unilateral disarmament. This position was abandoned with the rise of international tensions after 1933.

The VDB was mainly supported by atheists and liberal protestants from higher classes; the party was supported by civil servants, intellectuals and educated teachers. Regionally, the VDB received most of its support form the large cities Amsterdam and Rotterdam, but also from provincial centres in Groningen, Drenthe, North and South Holland.

== Electoral performance ==
=== General elections ===
Election	Lead candidate	List	Votes		Seats		Government
Election	Lead candidate	List	No.	%	No.	±	Government
1901	None	None	23,398	6.09	9 / 100	Steady	Opposition
1905	None	None	51,595	8.84	11 / 100	▲2	Government
1909	None	None	54,007	9.06	9 / 100	▼2	Opposition
1913	None	None	64,165	8.35	7 / 100	▼2	Government (1913–1914)
1913	None	None	64,165	8.35	7 / 100	▼2	Confidence (1914–1917)
1917	None	None	22,040	9.86	8 / 100	▲1	Confidence
1918	Henri Marchant	List	70,674	5.27	5 / 100	▼3	Opposition
1922	Henri Marchant	List	134,595	4.59	5 / 100	0	Opposition
1925	Henri Marchant	List	187,183	6.07	7 / 100	▲2	Opposition
1929	Henri Marchant	List	208,979	6.18	7 / 100	0	Opposition
1933	Dolf Joekes	List	188,950	5.08	6 / 100	▼1	Government
1937	Pieter Oud	List	239,502	5.90	6 / 100	0	Opposition (1939)
1937	Pieter Oud	List	239,502	5.90	6 / 100	0	Government (1939–1946)

=== Municipal government ===
In its strongholds of Amsterdam and Rotterdam, the party provided various mayors. The former VDB leader Oud was mayor of Rotterdam between 1938 and 1941. In 1919, Maria Elisabeth Stellwag-Bes became party leader for the VDB in the municipal elections in Delft and was elected to the Delft municipal council. Deputy leader Corry Tendeloo, who later became instrumental in the legal advancement of women's rights, was a member of the municipal council in Amsterdam.

== Organisation ==
=== Parliamentary leadership ===
- Parliamentary leaders in the House of Representatives
  - Hendrik Drucker (18 September 1901 – 29 June 1913)
  - Dirk Bos (29 June 1913 – 6 May 1916)
  - Henri Marchant (16 May 1916 – 27 May 1933)
  - Dolf Joekes (1 June 1933 – 20 September 1937)
  - Pieter Oud (20 September 1937 – 15 October 1938)
  - Dolf Joekes (16 October 1938 – 9 February 1946)
- Parliamentary leaders in the Senate
  - David van Embden (September 1923 – 9 January 1946)

=== Pillarisation ===
The VDB lacked a real system of pillarised organisations around it. "Neutral" organisations, which were not linked to a pillar, often had friendly relations with the VDB. This included the general broadcasting association AVRO (Algemene Verenigde Radio Omroep, General United Radio Broadcasting Organisation), the general union ANWV (Algemene Nederlandse Werkelieden Vereniging, the General Dutch Workers' Association); furthermore, the neutral employers' organisation VNO and the financial paper Het Handelsblad had good relations with the League. Together with the other liberal party, the Liberal State Party, these organisations formed the weak general pillar.

=== Relationships with other parties ===
The VDB was part of the Concentration the alliance with the Liberal Union and League of Free Liberals. These parties had good relations. The VDB served as bridge between the liberals and the Social Democratic Workers' Party (SDAP). The SDAP supported two liberal minority cabinets, but the SDAP was unwilling to join a cabinet with these bourgeois parties in 1913.

After 1918, when the liberals lost more than half of their seats, the relations with Concentration dissolved and the two other concentration parties merged to form the Liberal State Party. The VDB continued to serve as the bridge between liberals and socialists. This strategy resulted in the fall of the second Ruijs de Beerenbrouck cabinet in 1925. The VDB was unable to form a government of liberals, socialists and Catholics. In 1933 the relations between the SDAP and the VDB worsened as the VDB joined the Colijn cabinet, which had a very conservative economic policy. Their cooperation in World War II improved the relations between SDAP and VDB considerably. This led to the Breakthrough and the formation of the Labour Party, with the SDAP and the VDB being its major components.
