= Economic League (Netherlands) =

Economic League Economische Bond
- Abbreviation: EB
- Leader: Willem Treub
- Founder: Willem Treub
- Founded: 15 December 1917
- Dissolved: 1921
- Merged into: Liberal State Party
- Ideology: Liberalism; Classical liberalism
- Political position: Centre

The Economic League (Dutch: Economische Bond, EB) was a liberal political party in the Netherlands from 1917 to 1921.

== Party History ==
The EB was founded on 15 December 1917 by Willem Treub, a former Minister of Finance. He was a political independent, although he had been member of the progressive liberal Freethinking Democratic League (VDB) until 1913. He was a very successful minister and popular politician, especially in business and middle class circles. He was known as "Minister Forward". He advocated pragmatic politics implemented by strong independent politicians drawn from business. Treub's personalized campaign was supported by successful businessmen. In the 1918 elections the party won only three seats. After the elections the League joined the newly formed neutral parliamentary party, which united several one and two-person parties, namely the Economic League, the Neutral Party, the Peasants' League, the Middle Class Party and the Alliance to Democratise the Forces. The parliamentary party was led by Treub. In parliament, Treub was unable to retain his popularity, in the 1919 municipal elections, the party lost half its votes and won no seats. In the same year Treub, who realized his party had failed, initiated the formation of a liberal party, which would unite all liberal parties. In 1921, the Economic League merged into the Liberal State Party, together with the Liberal Union, League of Free Liberals, Neutral Party and the Middle Class Party. Treub left politics, and the influence of the League on this new party was rather limited.

== Ideology & Issues ==
The EB was a pragmatic liberal party which sought to replace ideological, partisan politics with pragmatic solutions for the common man. It had a liberal agenda, advocating a free market, with strong business and a limited, but efficient government. It sought to limit the power of parliament, while strengthening that of the cabinet.

== Leadership & Support ==
This table show the EB's results in elections to the House of Representatives and Senate, as well as the party's political leadership: the fractievoorzitter, is the chair of the parliamentary party and the lijsttrekker is the party's top candidate in the general election; these posts are normally taken by the party's leader.

Year	HoR	S	Lijsttrekker	Fractievoorzitter
1918	3	0	Willem Treub	Willem Treub
1919	3	0	no elections	Willem Treub
1920	3	0	no elections	Willem Treub

== Electorate ==
The party drew most of its support from voters who were not aligned with any of the major pillars. It drew most of its support from middle-class neighbourhoods in The Hague, Arnhem and the Gooi region, the region around Hilversum.
