= 1929 Dutch general election =

- 3 July 1929
- All 100 seats in the House of Representatives; 51 seats needed for a majority
- Turnout: 92.68% (▲1.33pp)
| Party | Leader | Vote % | Seats | +/– |
|---|---|---|---|---|
| RKSP | Willem Hubert Nolens | 29.64 | 30 | 0 |
| SDAP | Johan Willem Albarda | 23.81 | 24 | 0 |
| ARP | Hendrikus Colijn | 11.59 | 12 | −1 |
| CHU | Dirk Jan de Geer | 10.49 | 11 | 0 |
| LSP | Dirk Fock | 7.37 | 8 | −1 |
| VDB | Henri Marchant | 6.18 | 7 | 0 |
| SGP | Gerrit Hendrik Kersten | 2.27 | 3 | +1 |
| CPH | Louis de Visser | 2.00 | 2 | +1 |
| MPSL | Floris Vos | 1.18 | 1 | New |
| HGS | Casper Andries Lingbeek | 1.06 | 1 | 0 |
| PB | Arend Braat | 1.03 | 1 | 0 |
This lists parties that won seats. See the complete results below.
| Cabinet before | Cabinet after |
|---|---|
| First De Geer cabinet RKSP–ARP–CHU | Third Ruijs de Beerenbrouck cabinet RKSP–ARP–CHU |

General elections were held in the Netherlands on 3 July 1929. The Roman Catholic State Party remained the largest party in the House of Representatives, winning 30 of the 100 seats.

== Results ==
| Party | Votes | % | Seats | +/– |
|---|---|---|---|---|
| Roman Catholic State Party | 1,001,589 | 29.64 | 30 | 0 |
| Social Democratic Workers' Party | 804,714 | 23.81 | 24 | 0 |
| Anti-Revolutionary Party | 391,832 | 11.59 | 12 | –1 |
| Christian Historical Union | 354,548 | 10.49 | 11 | 0 |
| Liberal State Party | 249,105 | 7.37 | 8 | –1 |
| Free-thinking Democratic League | 208,979 | 6.18 | 7 | 0 |
| Reformed Political Party | 76,709 | 2.27 | 3 | +1 |
| Communist Party Holland | 67,541 | 2.00 | 2 | +1 |
| Middle Party for City and Country | 39,955 | 1.18 | 1 | New |
| Hervormd Gereformeerde Staatspartij | 35,931 | 1.06 | 1 | 0 |
| Farmers' League Left | 34,805 | 1.03 | 1 | 0 |
| Roman Catholic People's Party | 23,804 | 0.70 | 0 | –1 |
| Revolutionary Socialist Party | 21,812 | 0.65 | 0 | New |
| Federative Union | 17,509 | 0.52 | 0 | New |
| Christian Democratic Union | 12,780 | 0.38 | 0 | 0 |
| Democratic Party | 9,083 | 0.27 | 0 | 0 |
| Small Middle Class Party | 4,295 | 0.13 | 0 | New |
| National Farmers' League | 4,218 | 0.12 | 0 | New |
| Union of Nationalists | 3,685 | 0.11 | 0 | New |
| Roman Catholic Farmers' Party | 3,369 | 0.10 | 0 | New |
| General Welfare Party | 2,256 | 0.07 | 0 | New |
| Social Democratic People's Party | 2,156 | 0.06 | 0 | New |
| Christian Workers Party | 1,724 | 0.05 | 0 | New |
| Van Nunen List | 1,133 | 0.03 | 0 | New |
| Anti-Compulsory Voting Party | 1,125 | 0.03 | 0 | New |
| Social Economic People's Party | 940 | 0.03 | 0 | New |
| Main and Manual Workers | 845 | 0.03 | 0 | New |
| Invalids' Party | 715 | 0.02 | 0 | New |
| Verweij List | 623 | 0.02 | 0 | New |
| People's Party | 449 | 0.01 | 0 | New |
| Kiesvereniging Algemeen Belang | 417 | 0.01 | 0 | New |
| Neutral People's Party | 342 | 0.01 | 0 | New |
| Siedenburg List | 314 | 0.01 | 0 | New |
| Free Christian Party | 103 | 0.00 | 0 | New |
| International People's Party | 98 | 0.00 | 0 | New |
| Total | 3,379,503 | 100.00 | 100 | 0 |
| Valid votes | 3,379,503 | 95.41 | | |
| Invalid/blank votes | 162,482 | 4.59 | | |
| Total votes | 3,541,985 | 100.00 | | |
| Registered voters/turnout | 3,821,612 | 92.68 | | |
Source: CBS, Nederlandse verkiezingsuitslagen

== See also ==
- List of candidates in the 1929 Dutch general election
