= Liberal State Party =

Liberal State Party Liberale Staatspartij
- Abbreviation: LSP
- Leader: see Leadership
- Founded: 16 April 1921
- Dissolved: 5 October 1946
- Merger of: Liberal Union; League of Free Liberals; Economic League; Neutral Party; Middle Class Party
- Succeeded by: Freedom Party
- Youth wing: League of Young Liberals
- Ideology: Conservative liberalism
- Political position: Centre-right

The Liberal State Party, "the Freedom League" (Dutch: Liberale Staatspartij "de Vrijheidsbond", LSP), was a conservative liberal political party in the Netherlands from 1921 to 1948. It is historically linked to the People's Party for Freedom and Democracy (VVD), a major Dutch political party.

== History ==
The LSP was founded on 16 April 1921 as a merger of the mainstream liberal Liberal Union, the conservative liberal League of Free Liberals, the minor Economic League and the single seat parties of the Neutral Party and the Middle Class Party. They were joined by the General Political Party, who lacked parliamentary representation. These were all the liberal parties in the Netherlands except for the progressive-liberal Free-thinking Democratic League (VDB).

The merger was forced by the constitutional revision of 1918 implementing universal suffrage and proportional representation. The two biggest parties (the Liberal Union and the League of Free Liberals) had lost a considerable number of seats with the implementation of universal suffrage, while the other three parties had profited from the system of proportional representation.

During its entire existence the LSP lost seats, the party started with ten seats in 1922 and was left with only four in 1937. Unlike other social groups, the liberals did not build up a structure of pillarised organisations around it: therefore liberal voters were relatively independent from the League and were easily attracted by new political parties, like the National Socialist Movement. Although the party was very small it was part of coalition cabinet two times between 1933 and 1937 in the second and third cabinets of Hendrikus Colijn. In 1939 several individual League-members were involved in the short-lived fifth Colijn cabinet.

In 1941, after the Netherlands was invaded in 1940 by the Germans, the party was forbidden. In 1946, after the Netherlands was liberated, the Liberal State Party was reformed to the Freedom Party, which in 1948 became the People's Party for Freedom and Democracy (VVD).

In 1963 a group of VVD members tried to rekindle the "Freedom League" flame, but they were unable to gain seats in the elections and dissolved.

=== Name ===
The party was official founded as the "Freedom League" ("Vrijheidsbond"), during the 1920s the party adopted the name Liberal State Party, "the Freedom League" (Liberale Staatspartij, "de Vrijheidsbond"), after 1937 it adopted the name Liberal State Party ("Liberale Staatspartij").

== Ideology and electorate ==
The LSP was a conservative liberal party. Personal freedom was their most important principle. It therefore defended a small state and was in favour of free trade. Government should however be involved in providing social security for the extremely poor and pensions for the elderly. It defended public education. Internationally it favoured international (mutual) disarmament and the gradual implementation of autonomy for the Dutch Indies.

The LSP mainly received support from agnostics or latitudinarian protestants (such as Remonstrants, moderate orthodox or freethinking members of the Dutch Reformed Church and Mennonites) from higher classes: businessmen, civil servants, wealthy farmers, and voters with free professions (lawyers, doctors etc.). The party performed particularly well in the major trading cities Amsterdam and Rotterdam, the rich municipalities around Hilversum and The Hague and in northern rural provinces, like Groningen and Drenthe.

== Electoral performance ==
This table shows the LSP's results in elections to the House of Representatives, Senate and States-Provincial, as well as the party's political leadership: the fractievoorzitter, is the chair of the parliamentary party and the lijsttrekker is the party's top candidate in the general election, these posts are normally taken by the party's leader. The party's leader can also be in cabinet.

Election	Lead candidate	List	Votes	%	Seats	+/–	Government	Ref.
1922		List	271,358	9.3	10 / 100	Steady	Opposition	
1925		List	269,564	8.7	9 / 100	▼1	Opposition	
1929		List	249,105	7.4	8 / 100	▼1	Opposition	
1933		List	258,732	7.0	7 / 100	▼1	Coalition	
1937		List	160,260	4.9	4 / 100	▼3	Opposition	

=== Municipal and provincial government ===
The party was particularly strong in urban municipal and provincial governments. The party supplied several mayors of larger cities, such as Pieter Droogleever Fortuyn in Rotterdam

In the following figure one can see the election results of the provincial election of 1931 per province. It shows the areas where the LSP is strong, namely South Holland and too a lesser extent Gelderland and North Holland. The party is very weak in rural and Catholic Limburg and Brabant.

Province	Seats
Groningen	5
Friesland	4
Drenthe	6
Overijssel	4
Gelderland	8
Utrecht	4
North Holland	8
South Holland	11
Zeeland	6
North Brabant	1
Limburg	1

== Pillarisation ==
The LSP lacked a real system of pillarised organisations around it. 'Neutral' organisations, which were not linked to a pillar, often had friendly relations with the LSP. This included the general broadcasting association AVRO (Algemene Verenigde Radio Omroep, General United Radio Broadcasting Organisation), the general union ANWV (Algemene Nederlandse Werkelieden Vereniging, the General Dutch Workers' Association), furthermore the neutral employers' organisation VNO and the financial newspaper Het Handelsblad had good relations with the League. Together with the other liberal party, the VDB, these organisation formed the weak general pillar.

== Leadership ==
- Party chairmen:
  - 1921–1926: Hendrik Coenraad Dresselhuijs
  - 1927–1933: Dirk Fock
  - 1933–1938: Willem Carel Wendelaar
  - 1938–1945: Ben Telders
  - 1945: M.H. de Boer (acting)
- Chairmen of the parliamentary group:
  - 1921–1922: Pieter Rink
  - 1922–1926: Hendrik Coenraad Dresselhuijs
  - 1926–1929: Anton van Gijn
  - 1929–1933: Hendrik Johan Knottenbelt
  - 1933–1940: Steven Bierema
- Chairmen of the Senate group:
  - 1923–1932: Pieter Rink
  - 1932–1935: Dirk Fock
  - 1935–1938: Pieter Droogleever Fortuyn
  - 1938–1946: Joan Gelderman

== See also ==
- Liberalism
- List of liberal theorists
- Liberalism by country
- Liberal democracy
- Liberalism in the Netherlands
