= Willem Treub =

Dutch politician

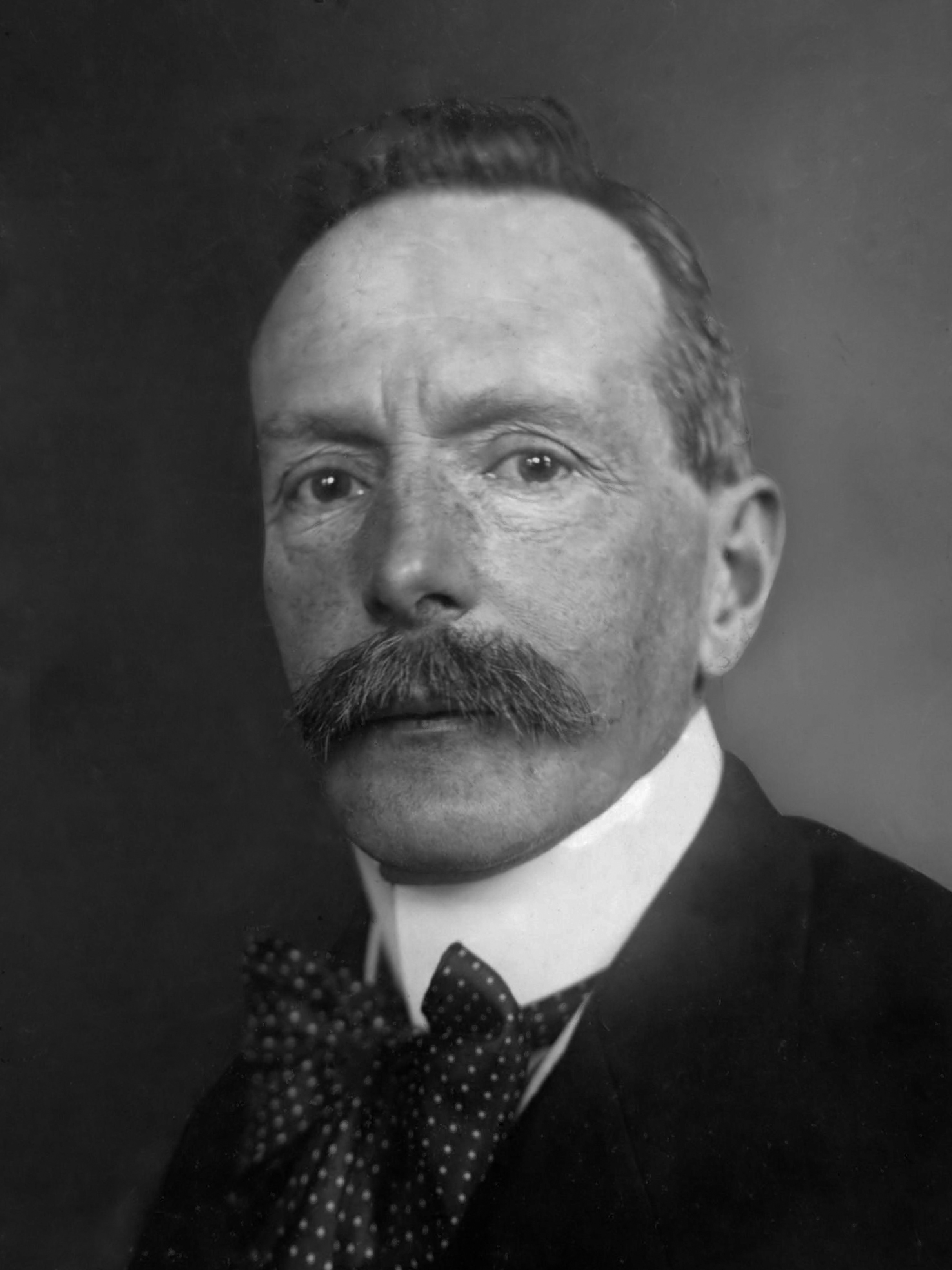
M.W.F. Treub in 1917

Marie Willem Frederik Treub (30 November 1858, Voorschoten – 24 July 1931, The Hague) was a Dutch politician.

== Biography ==
Marie Willem Frederik Treub was born to Jacobus Petrus Treub, mayor of Voorschoten, and his wife Marie Louise Cornaz. Together with his two brothers Hector and Melchior, he enjoyed primary education in Voorschoten and attended the Gemeentelijke HBS in Leiden, from which he graduated in 1876. After having obtained enough funds in minor municipal positions in Voorschoten, he studies law at Leiden University, and later at the University of Amsterdam, where he obtained his doctorate with his dissertation.

in 1885, Treub became a professor teaching tax law in Amsterdam, and he became an editor of the Weekblad voor Notarisambt en Registratie and the Sociaal Weekblad en Vragen des Tijds, notarial weeklies with a progressive liberal leaning, two years later. His political interest made him join the local classical liberal electoral association Burgerplicht, but it became apparent that its course could not be altered, and Willem Treub, along with others, established the radical electoral association Amsterdam. Treub was elected into the municipal council of Amsterdam in 1889, and became the city's alderman of finance in 1893. In this position, he introduced labour standards for municipal labourers, included clauses on minimum wages and maximum working hours in the scope statements of municipal projects, and instituted a municipal audit and construction supervision. As alderman for public works, an office he entered in 1895, Treub brought several private water supply and telephone companies under municipal ownership, and pushed for the nationalisation of tram and gas companies.

House of Representatives of the Netherlands
Preceded by Jan Jacob Willinge	Member for Assen; 1904–1913	Succeeded by Coen van Deventer
Political offices
Preceded by Syb Talma	Minister of Agriculture, Industry and Trade; 1913–1914	Succeeded by Folkert Posthuma
Preceded by Anthonij Ewoud Jan Bertling	Minister of Finance; 1914–1916	Succeeded by Anton van Gijn
Preceded by Anton van Gijn	Minister of Finance; 1917–1918	Succeeded by Simon de Vries
