= Wijk bij Duurstede (electoral district) =

The district of Wijk bij Duurstede in 1888

Wijk bij Duurstede was an electoral district of the House of Representatives in the Netherlands from 1888 to 1918.

== Profile ==
The electoral district of Wijk bij Duurstede was created as a single-seat district in 1888, mostly out of parts of the Tiel and Gorinchem districts, which were both reduced from two seats to one. Named after the town of Wijk bij Duurstede, the district was primarily rural and agrarian, and encompassed the southern part of the province of Utrecht along the Lek river, as well as the town of Culemborg and its surroundings in the province of Gelderland. In 1897, the municipalities of Bunnik and Oudenrijn were transferred to Wijk bij Duurstede from the district of Utrecht, which was split up.

Wijk bij Duurstede's population increased moderately from 44,024 in 1888 to 51,907 in 1909. Its population was religiously mixed; just under half was affiliated with the Dutch Reformed Church, while about 42% were Roman Catholic. Another 6-7% was Gereformeerd, while about 2% belonged to the category "Others".

The district of Wijk bij Duurstede was abolished upon the introduction of party-list proportional representation in 1918.

== Members ==
De Ridder, 1901

De Wijkerslooth de Weerdesteyn, 1913

Wijk bij Duurstede was a safe seat for the confessional right for most of its existence. Its inaugural election 1888 was won by Herman Schaepman, leader of the Catholic parliamentary group, but in the succeeding election he was narrowly defeated by Willem Hendrik de Beaufort, who would become the district's only liberal representative. In 1897, he was in turn defeated by the Anti-Revolutionary candidate Maurits van Asch van Wijck, and the district would subsequently remain in either Anti-Revolutionary or Catholic hands until its abolition in 1918.

By-elections were held in 1901, after Van Asch van Wijck did not take his seat due to his election to the Senate, and in 1909, after the death of incumbent member Nicolaas de Ridder.

Election	Member	Party	Ref.
1888	Herman Schaepman	Ka	
1891	Willem Hendrik de Beaufort	Lib	
1894	Willem Hendrik de Beaufort	Lib	
1897	Maurits van Asch van Wijck	AR	
1901	Maurits van Asch van Wijck	AR	
1901	Nicolaas de Ridder	AR	
1905	Nicolaas de Ridder	AR	
1909	Nicolaas de Ridder	AR	
1909	J.B.L.C.C. de Wijkerslooth de Weerdesteyn	Ka	
1913	J.B.L.C.C. de Wijkerslooth de Weerdesteyn	Ka	
1917	J.B.L.C.C. de Wijkerslooth de Weerdesteyn	Ka	

== Election results ==
=== Elections in the 1880s ===
1888 general election: Wijk bij Duurstede
Candidate	Party	First round		Second round	
Candidate	Party	Votes	%	Votes	%
Herman Schaepman	Ka	1,244	42.54	1,563	53.49
Willem van Goltstein van Oldenaller	Lib	905	30.95	1,359	46.51
Karel Antonie Godin de Beaufort	AR	765	26.16		
Others		10	0.34		
Total		2,924	100.00	2,922	100.00
Valid votes		2,924	99.52	2,922	98.48
Invalid/blank votes		14	0.48	45	1.52
Total votes		2,938	100.00	2,967	100.00
Registered voters/turnout		3,226	91.07	3,226	91.97
Catholic gain					
Source: Electoral Council, Huygens Institute

=== Elections in the 1890s ===
1891 general election: Wijk bij Duurstede
Candidate	Party	First round		Second round	
Candidate	Party	Votes	%	Votes	%
Herman Schaepman	Ka	1,148	41.61	1,448	49.74
Willem Hendrik de Beaufort	Lib	1,047	37.95	1,463	50.26
Hendrik Waller	AR	550	19.93		
Others		14	0.51		
Total		2,759	100.00	2,911	100.00
Valid votes		2,759	99.32	2,911	97.78
Invalid/blank votes		19	0.68	66	2.22
Total votes		2,778	100.00	2,977	100.00
Registered voters/turnout		3,260	85.21	3,260	91.32
Liberal gain					
Source: Electoral Council, Huygens Institute

1894 general election: Wijk bij Duurstede
Candidate	Party	First round		Second round	
Candidate	Party	Votes	%	Votes	%
Willem Hendrik de Beaufort (born 1844)	Lib	1,058	44.12	1,509	55.79
Stephanus Martinus van Wijck	Ka	962	40.12	1,196	44.21
Hendrik Waller	AR	346	14.43		
Willem Hendrik de Beaufort (born 1845)	Lib	32	1.33		
Others					
Total		2,398	100.00	2,705	100.00
Valid votes				2,705	98.83
Invalid/blank votes				32	1.17
Total votes				2,737	100.00
Registered voters/turnout		3,248	–	3,248	84.27
Liberal hold					
Source: Electoral Council, Huygens Institute (Note: The procès-verbal for the first round states the total number of valid votes as being 2,374, and turnout as being 2,398.)

1897 general election: Wijk bij Duurstede
Candidate	Party	Votes	%
Maurits van Asch van Wijck	AR	3,517	59.14
Willem Hendrik de Beaufort	Lib	1,993	33.51
Herman Verkouteren	CHK	292	4.91
Carel Victor Gerritsen	Rad	145	2.44
Total		5,947	100.00
Valid votes		5,947	98.04
Invalid/blank votes		119	1.96
Total votes		6,066	100.00
Registered voters/turnout		6,936	87.46
Anti-Revolutionary gain			
Source: Electoral Council, Huygens Institute

=== Elections in the 1900s ===
1901 general election: Wijk bij Duurstede
Candidate	Party	Votes	%
Maurits van Asch van Wijck	AR	3,091	69.09
J.G. van Rappard	Lib	1,015	22.69
Jan Oudegeest	SDAP	368	8.23
Total		4,474	100.00
Valid votes		4,474	96.55
Invalid/blank votes		160	3.45
Total votes		4,634	100.00
Registered voters/turnout		6,509	71.19
Anti-Revolutionary hold			
Source: Electoral Council, Huygens Institute

1901 Wijk bij Duurstede by-election
Candidate	Party	Votes	%
Nicolaas de Ridder	AR	2,414	71.70
J.G. van Rappard	Lib	953	28.30
Total		3,367	100.00
Valid votes		3,367	98.25
Invalid/blank votes		60	1.75
Total votes		3,427	100.00
Registered voters/turnout		6,509	52.65
Anti-Revolutionary hold			
Source: Electoral Council, Huygens Institute

1905 general election: Wijk bij Duurstede
Candidate	Party	Votes	%
Nicolaas de Ridder	AR	4,233	65.86
Hendrik Coenraad Dresselhuys	VL	2,065	32.13
Jan Oudegeest	SDAP	129	2.01
Total		6,427	100.00
Valid votes		6,427	98.26
Invalid/blank votes		114	1.74
Total votes		6,541	100.00
Registered voters/turnout		7,715	84.78
Anti-Revolutionary hold			
Source: Electoral Council, Huygens Institute

1909 general election: Wijk bij Duurstede
Candidate	Party	Votes	%
Nicolaas de Ridder	AR	4,409	72.83
P. Tideman	VL	1,403	23.17
W.F. Dekkers	SDAP	242	4.00
Total		6,054	100.00
Valid votes		6,054	97.43
Invalid/blank votes		160	2.57
Total votes		6,214	100.00
Registered voters/turnout		8,277	75.08
Anti-Revolutionary hold			
Source: Electoral Council, Huygens Institute

1909 Wijk bij Duurstede by-election
Candidate	Party	Votes	%
J.B.L.C.C. de Wijkerslooth de Weerdesteyn	Ka	3,683	55.07
Hendrik Coenraad Dresselhuys	VL	3,005	44.93
Total		6,688	100.00
Valid votes		6,688	97.94
Invalid/blank votes		141	2.06
Total votes		6,829	100.00
Registered voters/turnout		8,277	82.51
Catholic gain			
Source: Electoral Council, Huygens Institute

=== Elections in the 1910s ===
1913 general election: Wijk bij Duurstede
Candidate	Party	Votes	%
J.B.L.C.C. de Wijkerslooth de Weerdesteyn	Ka	4,698	53.67
Hendrik Coenraad Dresselhuys	VL	3,062	34.98
E.A. Keuchenius	CS	710	8.11
Jan van Leeuwen	SDAP	284	3.24
Total		8,754	100.00
Valid votes		8,754	98.35
Invalid/blank votes		147	1.65
Total votes		8,901	100.00
Registered voters/turnout		9,630	92.43
Catholic hold			
Source: Electoral Council, Huygens Institute

1917 general election: Wijk bij Duurstede
Candidate	Party	Votes	%
J.B.L.C.C. de Wijkerslooth de Weerdesteyn	Ka		
Total			
Registered voters/turnout		9,986	–
Catholic hold			
Source: Electoral Council, Huygens Institute
