= Hendrik Coenraad Dresselhuijs =

Dutch politician (1870–1926)

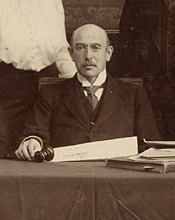
- Hendrik Coenraad Dresselhuijs in 1916

Member of the House of Representatives
- In office 14 December 1916 – 16 December 1926
- Preceded by: Meinard Tydeman
- Succeeded by: seat abolished
- Constituency: Tiel (until 1918)

Personal details
- Born: 31 December 1870 Culemborg, Netherlands
- Died: 20 December 1926 (aged 55) The Hague, Netherlands
- Party: League of Free Liberals (until 1921); LSP (1921–1926)
- Spouse: Johanna Willemina Elisabeth de Meijere (m. 1896)
- Relations: Mary Dresselhuys (niece)
- Children: 3
- Education: Utrecht University

Hendrik Coenraad Dresselhuijs (31 December 1870 – 20 December 1926) was a Dutch lawyer and politician. From 1916 to 1926, he was a member of the Dutch House of Representatives for the League of Free Liberals until 1921 and after for the Liberal State Party (LSP). He served as leader of the League of Free Liberals from 1918 to 1921, and as the leader of the LSP until his death in 1926.

== Early life ==
Hendrik Coenraad Dresselhuijs was born on 31 December 1870 in Culemborg. His father, Cornelis Willem Dresselhuijs, was a noted industrialist and alderman in Culemborg, and his mother Anna Maria van den Bosch died in 1873. Dresselhuijs attended schools in Culemborg and the gymnasium in Den Bosch from 1883 to 1889. He then studied law at Utrecht University, obtaining his doctorate in 1894.

After his university education, Dresselhuijs began working as a lawyer in Tiel at the law firm of Pieter Rink in 1894. He was appointed as a judge in Tiel in 1903, where he would occupy various other functions during this period, including head of the local chamber of commerce and serving as member of the municipal council. As a judge, Dresselhuijs gained a reputation as a humane judge, and was recommended for a position in the Hoge Raad. In 1906, Dresselhuijs began working at the Department of Justice in The Hague, where he was initially tasked with overseeing child welfare, becoming director-general of prisons in 1909. In 1911, Dresselhuijs was promoted to the position of secretary-general of justice, a position which he would hold until 1916.

== Political career ==
Dresselhuijs was a signatory to the founding manifesto of the conservative liberal League of Free Liberals (Bond van Vrije Liberalen) in 1905. He ran for the Wijk bij Duurstede electoral district in the 1905, 1909, and 1913 Dutch general elections, but lost every time. In 1916, Dresselhuijs was elected as a member of the House of Representatives for the Tiel electoral district, succeeding the former League of Free Liberals leader Meinard Tydeman. As an MP, Dresselhuijs focused on issues including justice, education, labor, and economic affairs. In 1918, he became chairman of the League of Free Liberals.

Dresselhuijs held relatively conservative free-market positions on economic issues, though he supported several reform efforts of the First Ruijs de Beerenbrouck cabinet as well as social insurance schemes. Following the outbreak of World War I, Dresselhuijs became involved in the Dutch anti-war movement, serving as head of the Dutch Anti-War Council (Nederlandsche Anti-Oorlogsraad) from 1914 to 1919 and traveling to the German Empire in 1915 in a failed attempt to broker a peace deal. As an MP, Dresselhuijs became an advocate for international diplomacy and the League of Nations. He opposed full demilitarization, proposing instead that the Netherlands contribute to an international armed force under the League of Nations.

Dresselhuijs strongly supported cooperation between the various liberal parties, even after the electoral agreement between the League of Free Liberals and the Liberal Union was ended in 1917 after the adoption of proportional representation. After both parties merged into the Liberal State Party (Freedom League) in 1921, Dresselhuijs became its first leader. In 1925, Dresselhuijs submitted a proposal to abolish proportional representation and return to a district-based electoral system, but this failed.

Hendrik Coenraad Dresselhuijs died on 20 December 1926 in The Hague.

== Personal life ==
Dresselhuijs married Johanna Willemina Elisabeth de Meijere on 16 January 1896. The couple had three daughters together. He was the uncle of Dutch actress Mary Dresselhuys.
