= Gulpen (electoral district) =

Electoral district in the Netherlands (1888–1918)

Gulpen was an electoral district of the House of Representatives in the Netherlands from 1888 to 1918.

== Profile ==
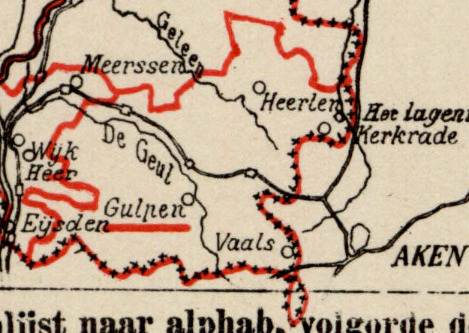
Gulpen in 1888

The electoral district of Gulpen was created in 1888 out of part of the Maastricht district, which was reduced from two seats to one. Gulpen's boundaries remained the same throughout the electoral district's existence. It was situated in the south of the province of Limburg, including places such as Heerlen, Kerkrade and Vaals, as well as the village of Gulpen, after which it was named. Containing much of the South Limburg coal mining basin, mining was the most important economic activity in the district.

Over the course of its existence, the district's population increased substantially, from 43,350 in 1888 to 65,456 in 1909. Around 99% of the population was Catholic in 1888 and 1897, though this proportion dropped to 96.5% in 1909. In that same year, 1.1% of the population was Reformed, 0.3% was Gereformeerd and 2.1% belonged to the category "Others".

The district of Gulpen was abolished upon the introduction of party-list proportional representation in 1918.

== Members ==
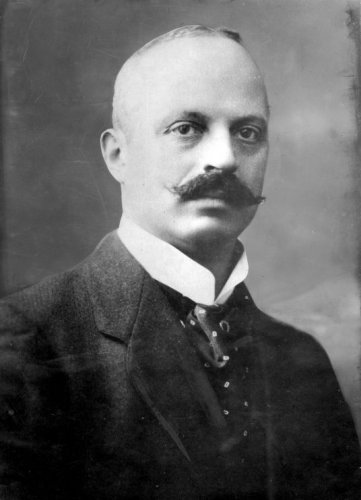
Charles Ruijs de Beerenbrouck

Like most districts in the Catholic south of the country, Gulpen was a safe seat for the Catholics, united in the General League of Roman Catholic Electoral Associations from 1904 onward. The Catholics held the seat continuously throughout its existence. Unlike other districts in the south, however, elections in Gulpen were rarely uncontested, with multiple Catholic candidates often standing against each other. Most famous among its members was Charles Ruijs de Beerenbrouck, who was first elected in 1905 and continued to represent the district until his appointment as Queen's Commissioner of Limburg in 1918. This triggered a by-election just a month before the district's abolition. Ruijs de Beerenbrouck would become Chairman of the Council of Ministers later that year.

Election	Member	Party	Ref
1888	L.F.H.C. Ruland	Ka	
1891	Iwan de Marchant et d'Ansembourg	Ka	
1894	Iwan de Marchant et d'Ansembourg	Ka	
1897	J.M.M.H. Merckelbach	Ka	
1901	J.M.M.H. Merckelbach	Ka	
1905	Charles Ruijs de Beerenbrouck	Ka	
1909	Charles Ruijs de Beerenbrouck	Ka	
1909	Charles Ruijs de Beerenbrouck	Ka	
1913	Charles Ruijs de Beerenbrouck	Ka	
1917	Charles Ruijs de Beerenbrouck	Ka	
1918	Henri Hermans	Ka	

== Election results ==
=== Elections in the 1880s ===
1888 general election: Gulpen
Candidate	Party	Votes	%
Leonard Frans Hubert Carl Ruland	Ka	727	58.25
G. Smeets	Lib	514	41.19
Others		7	0.56
Total		1,248	100.00
Valid votes		1,248	99.44
Invalid/blank votes		7	0.56
Total votes		1,255	100.00
Registered voters/turnout		1,741	72.09
Catholic gain			
Source: Kiesraad, Huygens Instituut

=== Elections in the 1890s ===
1891 general election: Gulpen
Candidate	Party	Votes	%
Iwan de Marchant et d'Ansembourg	Ka	688	74.78
Lemmens	Independent	214	23.26
Others		18	1.96
Total		920	100.00
Valid votes		920	98.61
Invalid/blank votes		13	1.39
Total votes		933	100.00
Registered voters/turnout		1,907	48.93
Catholic hold			
Source: Kiesraad, Huygens Instituut

1894 general election: Gulpen
Candidate	Party	Votes	%
Iwan de Marchant et d'Ansembourg	Ka	490	80.86
J. Thissen	Independent	70	11.55
Janssen	Independent	31	5.12
Others		15	2.48
Total		606	100.00
Valid votes		606	97.27
Invalid/blank votes		17	2.73
Total votes		623	100.00
Registered voters/turnout		1,986	31.37
Catholic hold			
Source: Kiesraad, Huygens Instituut

1897 general election: Gulpen
Candidate	Party	Votes	%
Joseph Mathias Maria Hubertus Merckelbach	Ka	1,828	51.15
Louis Regout	Ka	1,552	43.42
A.P.E.A. Wijnans	Ka	194	5.43
Total		3,574	100.00
Valid votes		3,574	98.70
Invalid/blank votes		47	1.30
Total votes		3,621	100.00
Registered voters/turnout		5,287	68.49
Catholic hold			
Source: Kiesraad, Huygens Instituut

=== Elections in the 1900s ===
1901 general election: Gulpen
Candidate	Party	Votes	%
Joseph Mathias Maria Hubertus Merckelbach	Ka	1,695	82.48
Louis van der Maesen de Sombreff	Ka	360	17.52
Total		2,055	100.00
Valid votes		2,055	97.58
Invalid/blank votes		51	2.42
Total votes		2,106	100.00
Registered voters/turnout		6,029	34.93
Catholic hold			
Source: Kiesraad, Huygens Instituut

1905 general election: Gulpen
Candidate	Party	Votes	%
Charles Ruijs de Beerenbrouck	Ka	3,297	64.89
J.H. Pinckers	Ka	1,606	31.61
Henri van Kol	SDAP	178	3.50
Total		5,081	100.00
Valid votes		5,081	96.95
Invalid/blank votes		160	3.05
Total votes		5,241	100.00
Registered voters/turnout		7,031	74.54
Catholic hold			
Source: Kiesraad, Huygens Instituut

1909 general election: Gulpen
Candidate	Party	Votes	%
Charles Ruijs de Beerenbrouck	Ka	4,098	58.69
P.M.F.H. Brouwers	Ka	2,787	39.92
Henri van Kol	SDAP	97	1.39
Total		6,982	100.00
Valid votes		6,982	97.99
Invalid/blank votes		143	2.01
Total votes		7,125	100.00
Registered voters/turnout		8,561	83.23
Catholic hold			
Source: Kiesraad, Huygens Instituut

1909 Gulpen by-election
Candidate	Party	Votes	%
Charles Ruijs de Beerenbrouck	Ka	3,503	88.44
Louis Hermans	SDAP	458	11.56
Total		3,961	100.00
Valid votes		3,961	94.56
Invalid/blank votes		228	5.44
Total votes		4,189	100.00
Registered voters/turnout		8,561	48.93
Catholic hold			
Source: Kiesraad, Huygens Instituut

=== Elections in the 1910s ===
1913 general election: Gulpen
Candidate	Party	Votes	%
Charles Ruijs de Beerenbrouck	Ka	4,856	68.00
N.J. Schrijen	Ka	1,774	24.84
Willem Vliegen	SDAP	213	2.98
A.P.E.A. Wijmans	Ind	155	2.17
J. Diepen	Ka	143	2.00
Total		7,141	100.00
Valid votes		7,141	96.79
Invalid/blank votes		237	3.21
Total votes		7,378	100.00
Registered voters/turnout		10,519	70.14
Catholic hold			
Source: Kiesraad, Huygens Instituut

1917 general election: Gulpen
Candidate	Party	Votes	%
Charles Ruijs de Beerenbrouck	Ka		
Total			
Registered voters/turnout		12,477	–
Catholic hold			
Source: Kiesraad, Huygens Instituut

1918 Gulpen by-election
Candidate	Party	Votes	%
Henri Hermans	Ka	4,368	83.69
K.J. Vroemen	Ind	851	16.31
Total		5,219	100.00
Valid votes		5,219	96.11
Invalid/blank votes		211	3.89
Total votes		5,430	100.00
Registered voters/turnout		12,477	43.52
Catholic hold			
Source: Kiesraad, Huygens Instituut
