= 1913 Dutch general election =

- 17 June 1913 (first round); 25 June 1913 (second round)
- All 100 seats in the House of Representatives; 51 seats needed for a majority
- Turnout: 84.62% (first round); 84.57% (second round)
Party	Leader	Seats	+/–
AB	Willem Hubert Nolens	25	0
LU	Hendrik Goeman Borgesius	20	−1
SDAP	Pieter Jelles Troelstra	18	+11
ARP	Abraham Kuyper	11	−10
BVL	Meinard Tydeman	10	+6
CHU	Alexander de Savornin Lohman	8	−4
VDB	Dirk Bos	7	−1
Ind CHU	Cornelis Bichon van IJsselmonde	1	New
This lists parties that won seats. See the complete results below.
Results by constituency
Cabinet before	Cabinet after
Theo Heemskerk cabinet Coalition	Cort van der Linden cabinet Liberal

General elections were held in the Netherlands on 17 June 1913, with a second round in some constituencies on 25 June. Despite receiving the third highest number of votes in the first round, the General League of Roman Catholic Electoral Associations emerged as the largest party, winning 25 of the 100 seats in the House of Representatives. After the election, the independent liberal Pieter Cort van der Linden became Prime Minister of the Netherlands, leading a cabinet of Liberals, Free-thinking Democrats, Christian Historicals and other independent liberals.

== Electoral system ==
The 100 seats in the House of Representatives were elected in single-member constituencies using the two-round system.

== Results ==
Party	First round			Second round			Total seats
Party	Votes	%	Seats	Votes	%	Seats	Total seats
Anti-Revolutionary Party	158,598	20.63	10	88,238	21.67	1	11
Social Democratic Workers' Party	144,249	18.76	1	94,667	23.25	17	18
General League	127,058	16.53	24	18,758	4.61	1	25
Liberal Union	125,601	16.34	7	71,626	17.59	13	20
Christian Historical Union	79,811	10.38	7	40,047	9.84	1	8
Free-thinking Democratic League	62,189	8.09	2	41,852	10.28	5	7
League of Free Liberals	48,731	6.34	2	41,618	10.22	8	10
Independent Christian Historical	5,664	0.74	0	5,078	1.25	1	1
National League of Protestant Voters	5,317	0.69	0				0
Christian Social Party	4,500	0.59	0				0
Social Democratic Party	1,339	0.17	0				0
Christian Democratic Party	1,220	0.16	0				0
Independent	4,475	0.58	0	5,255	1.29	0	0
Total	768,752	100.00	53	407,139	100.00	47	100
Valid votes	768,752	98.51		407,139	99.31		
Invalid/blank votes	11,622	1.49		2,840	0.69		
Total votes	780,374	100.00		409,979	100.00		
Registered voters/turnout	922,173	84.62		484,753	84.57		
Source: Kiesraad, Huygens

Several candidates ran in multiple districts. When they won in more than one seat they picked which seat to take. As a result, several by-elections took place shortly after the general election.

=== By district ===
Results by district
District	Candidate	Party	First round		Second round	
District	Candidate	Party	Votes	%	Votes	%
Alkmaar	P. van Foreest	League of Free Liberals	4,621	43.07	6,144	57.49
Alkmaar	J. R. Snoeck Henkemans	Christian Historical Union	4,505	41.99	4,544	42.51
Alkmaar	A. H. Gerhard	Social Democratic Workers' Party	1,603	14.94		
Alkmaar	Valid votes		10,729	99.17	10,688	99.59
Alkmaar	Invalid/blank votes		90	0.83	44	0.41
Alkmaar	Total votes		10,819	100	10,732	100
Alkmaar	Registered voters/turnout		11,523	93.89	11,523	93.14
Almelo	P. J. M. Aalberse	General League	5,338	71.48		
Almelo	F. M. Wibaut	Social Democratic Workers' Party	1,106	14.81		
Almelo	H. Goeman Borgesius	Liberal Union	1,024	13.71		
Almelo	Valid votes		7,468	97.44		
Almelo	Invalid/blank votes		196	2.56		
Almelo	Total votes		7,664	100		
Almelo	Registered voters/turnout		10,107	75.83		
Amersfoort	H. W. van Asch van Wijck	Anti-Revolutionary Party	5,118	46.95	5,636	48.64
Amersfoort	W. H. de Beaufort	League of Free Liberals	5,007	45.94	5,950	51.36
Amersfoort	J. van Leeuwen	Social Democratic Workers' Party	775	7.11		
Amersfoort	Valid votes		10,900	98.82	11,586	99.54
Amersfoort	Invalid/blank votes		130	1.18	53	0.46
Amersfoort	Total votes		11,030	100	11,639	100
Amersfoort	Registered voters/turnout		12,193	90.46	12,193	95.46
Amsterdam I	H. F. R. Hubrecht	Liberal Union	1,944	49.87	2,583	68.08
Amsterdam I	J. W. Smit	General League	1,186	30.43	1,211	31.92
Amsterdam I	A. H. Gerhard	Social Democratic Workers' Party	768	19.7		
Amsterdam I	Valid votes		3,898	98.38	3,794	99.35
Amsterdam I	Invalid/blank votes		64	1.62	25	0.65
Amsterdam I	Total votes		3,962	100	3,819	100
Amsterdam I	Registered voters/turnout		5,184	76.43	5,184	73.67
Amsterdam II	M. Mendels	Social Democratic Workers' Party	1,837	47.52	2,347	64.35
Amsterdam II	J. R. Snoeck Henkemans	Christian Historical Union	1,057	27.34	1,300	35.65
Amsterdam II	P. Otto	Liberal Union	916	23.69		
Amsterdam II	H. Gorter	Social Democratic Party	56	1.45		
Amsterdam II	Valid votes		3,866	96.99	3,647	98.7
Amsterdam II	Invalid/blank votes		120	3.01	48	1.3
Amsterdam II	Total votes		3,986	100	3,695	100
Amsterdam II	Registered voters/turnout		5,041	79.07	5,041	73.3
Amsterdam III	P. J. Troelstra	Social Democratic Workers' Party	7,309	57.17		
Amsterdam III	P. J. Reijmer	General League	2,781	21.75		
Amsterdam III	B. E. Asscher	Liberal Union	2,518	19.69		
Amsterdam III	D. J. Wijnkoop	Social Democratic Party	177	1.38		
Amsterdam III	Valid votes		12,785	97.22		
Amsterdam III	Invalid/blank votes		365	2.78		
Amsterdam III	Total votes		13,150	100		
Amsterdam III	Registered voters/turnout		16,516	79.62		
Amsterdam IV	G. A. van Hamel	Liberal Union	2,037	53.83		
Amsterdam IV	J. Loopuit	Social Democratic Workers' Party	1,351	35.7		
Amsterdam IV	H. W. Hovy	Anti-Revolutionary Party	396	10.47		
Amsterdam IV	Valid votes		3,784	98.46		
Amsterdam IV	Invalid/blank votes		59	1.54		
Amsterdam IV	Total votes		3,843	100		
Amsterdam IV	Registered voters/turnout		4,733	81.2		
Amsterdam V	T. M. Ketelaar	Free-thinking Democratic League	5,304	41.45	5,812	55.01
Amsterdam V	A. H. Gerhard	Social Democratic Workers' Party	3,995	31.22	4,753	44.99
Amsterdam V	J. ter Haar Jr.	Christian Historical Union	3,469	27.11		
Amsterdam V	H. J. A. Mulder	Independent	28	0.22		
Amsterdam V	Valid votes		12,796	96.58	10,565	98.79
Amsterdam V	Invalid/blank votes		453	3.42	129	1.21
Amsterdam V	Total votes		13,249	100	10,694	100
Amsterdam V	Registered voters/turnout		16,136	82.11	16,136	66.27
Amsterdam VI	W. H. de Beaufort	League of Free Liberals	2,547	52.35		
Amsterdam VI	H. Verkouteren	Christian Historical Union	1,735	35.66		
Amsterdam VI	J. Loopuit	Social Democratic Workers' Party	583	11.98		
Amsterdam VI	Valid votes		4,865	99.22		
Amsterdam VI	Invalid/blank votes		38	0.78		
Amsterdam VI	Total votes		4,903	100		
Amsterdam VI	Registered voters/turnout		6,048	81.07		
Amsterdam VII	G. A. A. Middelberg	Anti-Revolutionary Party	1,758	40.16	1,862	42.16
Amsterdam VII	W. Boissevain	League of Free Liberals	1,659	37.9	2,555	57.84
Amsterdam VII	W. H. Vliegen	Social Democratic Workers' Party	960	21.93		
Amsterdam VII	Valid votes		4,377	98.54	4,417	99.41
Amsterdam VII	Invalid/blank votes		65	1.46	26	0.59
Amsterdam VII	Total votes		4,442	100	4,443	100
Amsterdam VII	Registered voters/turnout		5,237	84.82	5,237	84.84
Amsterdam VIII	W. de Vlugt	Independent	1,572	34.85	2,107	46.24
Amsterdam VIII	A. B. Kleerekoper	Social Democratic Workers' Party	1,511	33.5	2,450	53.76
Amsterdam VIII	P. Nolting	Free-thinking Democratic League	1,410	31.26		
Amsterdam VIII	B. Luteraan	Social Democratic Party	18	0.4		
Amsterdam VIII	Valid votes		4,511	96.39	4,557	98.91
Amsterdam VIII	Invalid/blank votes		169	3.61	50	1.09
Amsterdam VIII	Total votes		4,680	100	4,607	100
Amsterdam VIII	Registered voters/turnout		5,641	82.96	5,641	81.67
Amsterdam IX	W. H. Vliegen	Social Democratic Workers' Party	8,204	46.81	11,038	64.22
Amsterdam IX	V. H. Rutgers	Anti-Revolutionary Party	5,519	31.49	6,149	35.78
Amsterdam IX	T. B. Pleijte	Free-thinking Democratic League	3,655	20.86		
Amsterdam IX	D. J. Wijnkoop	Social Democratic Party	147	0.84		
Amsterdam IX	Valid votes		17,525	95.89	17,187	99.38
Amsterdam IX	Invalid/blank votes		751	4.11	108	0.62
Amsterdam IX	Total votes		18,276	100	17,295	100
Amsterdam IX	Registered voters/turnout		22,557	81.02	22,557	76.67
Apeldoorn	W. K. F. P. graaf van Bylandt	Christian Historical Union	4,172	49.12	5,095	50.44
Apeldoorn	J. Esmeijer	Free-thinking Democratic League	3,155	37.15	5,007	49.56
Apeldoorn	A. Dijkgraaf	Social Democratic Workers' Party	636	7.49		
Apeldoorn	P. J. Muller	National League of Protestant Voters	530	6.24		
Apeldoorn	Valid votes		8,493	96.39	10,102	99.46
Apeldoorn	Invalid/blank votes		318	3.61	55	0.54
Apeldoorn	Total votes		8,811	100	10,157	100
Apeldoorn	Registered voters/turnout		10,830	81.36	10,830	93.79
Appingedam	J. H. A. Schaper	Social Democratic Workers' Party	2,747	34.57	4,495	59
Appingedam	A. Zijlstra	Anti-Revolutionary Party	2,341	29.46	3,124	41
Appingedam	T. G. G. Valette	Free-thinking Democratic League	2,167	27.27		
Appingedam	E. J. Thomassen à Thuessink van der Hoop van Slochteren	Christian Historical Union	691	8.7		
Appingedam	Valid votes		7,946	98.65	7,619	99.27
Appingedam	Invalid/blank votes		109	1.35	56	0.73
Appingedam	Total votes		8,055	100	7,675	100
Appingedam	Registered voters/turnout		8,238	97.78	9,238	83.08
Arnhem	J. A. de Wilde	Anti-Revolutionary Party	3,093	38.91	3,038	38.5
Arnhem	K. Eland	Liberal Union	2,923	36.77	4,852	61.5
Arnhem	L. M. Hermans	Social Democratic Workers' Party	1,933	24.32		
Arnhem	Valid votes		7,949	99.29	7,890	99.66
Arnhem	Invalid/blank votes		57	0.71	27	0.34
Arnhem	Total votes		8,006	100	7,917	100
Arnhem	Registered voters/turnout		9,044	88.52	9,044	87.54
Assen	C. T. van Deventer	Free-thinking Democratic League	3,097	53.22		
Assen	A. van der Heide	Social Democratic Workers' Party	1,672	28.73		
Assen	J. A. de Wilde	Anti-Revolutionary Party	1,050	18.04		
Assen	Valid votes		5,819	98.13		
Assen	Invalid/blank votes		111	1.87		
Assen	Total votes		5,930	100		
Assen	Registered voters/turnout		8,912	66.54		
Bergen op Zoom	W. J. F. Juten	General League	3,293	48.66	3,940	51.32
Bergen op Zoom	L. D. J. L. de Ram	General League	2,932	43.33	3,737	48.68
Bergen op Zoom	G. W. Kernkamp	Free-thinking Democratic League	301	4.45		
Bergen op Zoom	H. A. Koomans	Social Democratic Workers' Party	144	2.13		
Bergen op Zoom	T. C. van Erp	General League	97	1.43		
Bergen op Zoom	Valid votes		6,767	98.49	7,677	99.28
Bergen op Zoom	Invalid/blank votes		104	1.51	56	0.72
Bergen op Zoom	Total votes		6,871	100	7,733	100
Bergen op Zoom	Registered voters/turnout		8,759	78.45	8,759	88.29
Beverwijk	W. C. J. Passtoors	General League	6,875	46.47	6,973	46.93
Beverwijk	L. N. Roodenburg	Free-thinking Democratic League	5,888	39.8	7,885	53.07
Beverwijk	A. Nagtzaam	Social Democratic Workers' Party	1,812	12.25		
Beverwijk	A. van der Flier G. Jzn.	Christian Social Party	218	1.47		
Beverwijk	Valid votes		14,793	99.29	14,858	99.62
Beverwijk	Invalid/blank votes		106	0.71	56	0.38
Beverwijk	Total votes		14,899	100	14,914	100
Beverwijk	Registered voters/turnout		15,864	93.92	15,864	94.01
Bodegraven	J. W. H. M. van Idsinga	Christian Historical Union	5,043	63.32		
Bodegraven	J. W. F. S. Middelbeek	Liberal Union	2,490	31.27		
Bodegraven	J. Timmer	Social Democratic Workers' Party	431	5.41		
Bodegraven	Valid votes		7,964	99.13		
Bodegraven	Invalid/blank votes		70	0.87		
Bodegraven	Total votes		8,034	100		
Bodegraven	Registered voters/turnout		9,455	84.97		
Breda	W. H. Bogaardt	General League	4,089	72.95		
Breda	G. W. Kernkamp	Free-thinking Democratic League	824	14.7		
Breda	H. A. Koomans	Social Democratic Workers' Party	692	12.35		
Breda	Valid votes		5,605	98.3		
Breda	Invalid/blank votes		97	1.7		
Breda	Total votes		5,702	100		
Breda	Registered voters/turnout		8,017	71.12		
Breukelen	F. H. de Monté ver Loren	Anti-Revolutionary Party	5,040	73.18		
Breukelen	J. A. van Hamel	Liberal Union	1,847	26.82		
Breukelen	Valid votes		6,887	99.44		
Breukelen	Invalid/blank votes		39	0.56		
Breukelen	Total votes		6,926	100		
Breukelen	Registered voters/turnout		8,318	83.27		
Brielle	A. Roodhuyzen	Liberal Union	3,047	41.85	4,278	62.23
Brielle	A. Colijn Jr.	Anti-Revolutionary Party	2,574	35.36	2,597	37.77
Brielle	A. W. Heijkoop	Social Democratic Workers' Party	1,659	22.79		
Brielle	Valid votes		7,280	99.21	6,875	99.35
Brielle	Invalid/blank votes		58	0.79	45	0.65
Brielle	Total votes		7,338	100	6,920	100
Brielle	Registered voters/turnout		8,519	86.14	8,519	81.23
Delft	H. A. van de Velde	Anti-Revolutionary Party	4,029	57.9		
Delft	W. J. C. van Santen	Liberal Union	1,611	23.15		
Delft	S. P. Baart	Social Democratic Workers' Party	1,238	17.79		
Delft	W. van Ravesteijn Jr.	Social Democratic Party	81	1.16		
Delft	Valid votes		6,959	97.96		
Delft	Invalid/blank votes		145	2.04		
Delft	Total votes		7,104	100		
Delft	Registered voters/turnout		8,453	84.04		
Den Bosch	A. F. O. van Sasse van Ysselt	General League	3,521	87.28		
Den Bosch	J. Westerhof	Social Democratic Workers' Party	513	12.72		
Den Bosch	Valid votes		4,034	98.53		
Den Bosch	Invalid/blank votes		60	1.47		
Den Bosch	Total votes		4,094	100		
Den Bosch	Registered voters/turnout		6,466	63.32		
Den Haag I	K. ter Laan	Social Democratic Workers' Party	4,836	45.37	6,329	60.42
Den Haag I	C. Smeenk	Anti-Revolutionary Party	3,682	34.55	4,146	39.58
Den Haag I	E. Deen	Free-thinking Democratic League	1,933	18.14		
Den Haag I	A. ten Bosch N. Jzn.	Independent	164	1.54		
Den Haag I	L. L. H. de Visser	Social Democratic Party	43	0.4		
Den Haag I	Valid votes		10,658	98.38	10,475	99.18
Den Haag I	Invalid/blank votes		176	1.62	87	0.82
Den Haag I	Total votes		10,834	100	10,562	100
Den Haag I	Registered voters/turnout		13,029	83.15	13,029	81.07
Den Haag II	J. R. Snoeck Henkemans	Christian Historical Union	4,380	40.01	4,610	41.51
Den Haag II	W. Dolk	Liberal Union	3,727	34.05	6,496	58.49
Den Haag II	L. Hoejenbos	Social Democratic Workers' Party	2,800	25.58		
Den Haag II	B. Luteraan	Social Democratic Party	39	0.36		
Den Haag II	Valid votes		10,946	98.72	11,106	99.61
Den Haag II	Invalid/blank votes		142	1.28	43	0.39
Den Haag II	Total votes		11,088	100	11,149	100
Den Haag II	Registered voters/turnout		13,635	81.32	13,635	81.77
Den Haag III	J. C. Jansen	Liberal Union	6,380	57.74		
Den Haag III	J. G. Suring	General League	2,853	25.82		
Den Haag III	F. W. N. Hugenholtz	Social Democratic Workers' Party	1,314	11.89		
Den Haag III	P. J. Muller	National League of Protestant Voters	502	4.54		
Den Haag III	Valid votes		11,049	98.84		
Den Haag III	Invalid/blank votes		130	1.16		
Den Haag III	Total votes		11,179	100		
Den Haag III	Registered voters/turnout		15,130	73.89		
Den Helder	T. H. de Meester	Liberal Union	2,778	37.9	3,486	58.15
Den Helder	C. Thomassen	Social Democratic Workers' Party	2,171	29.62	2,509	41.85
Den Helder	A. P. Staalman	Christian Democratic Party	1,220	16.64		
Den Helder	C. J. van der Hegge Spies	Anti-Revolutionary Party	1,161	15.84		
Den Helder	Valid votes		7,330	99.07	5,995	98.52
Den Helder	Invalid/blank votes		69	0.93	90	1.48
Den Helder	Total votes		7,399	100	6,085	100
Den Helder	Registered voters/turnout		9,031	81.93	9,031	67.38
Deventer	H. P. Marchant	Free-thinking Democratic League	3,573	52.98		
Deventer	J. C. baron van Haersolte	Anti-Revolutionary Party	2,236	33.16		
Deventer	A. H. Gerhard	Social Democratic Workers' Party	935	13.86		
Deventer	Valid votes		6,744	98.97		
Deventer	Invalid/blank votes		70	1.03		
Deventer	Total votes		6,814	100		
Deventer	Registered voters/turnout		8,431	80.82		
Doetinchem	P. van Vliet	Anti-Revolutionary Party	6,078	50.61		
Doetinchem	H. P. J. Bloemers	Liberal Union	4,366	36.35		
Doetinchem	A. R. van de Laar	Christian Social Party	903	7.52		
Doetinchem	L. M. Hermans	Social Democratic Workers' Party	663	5.52		
Doetinchem	Valid votes		12,010	98.86		
Doetinchem	Invalid/blank votes		139	1.14		
Doetinchem	Total votes		12,149	100		
Doetinchem	Registered voters/turnout		12,706	95.62		
Dokkum	R. van Veen	Christian Historical Union	4,096	53.73		
Dokkum	J. Sibinga Mulder	Liberal Union	2,937	38.52		
Dokkum	P. J. Troelstra	Social Democratic Workers' Party	591	7.75		
Dokkum	Valid votes		7,624	99.32		
Dokkum	Invalid/blank votes		52	0.68		
Dokkum	Total votes		7,676	100		
Dokkum	Registered voters/turnout		8,144	94.25		
Dordrecht	H. C. Hogerzeil	Anti-Revolutionary Party	3,506	42.19	3,744	44.69
Dordrecht	M. M. Schim van der Loeff	Liberal Union	2,751	33.1	4,634	55.31
Dordrecht	J. H. F. van Zadelhoff	Social Democratic Workers' Party	2,054	24.71		
Dordrecht	Valid votes		8,311	98.71	8,378	99.25
Dordrecht	Invalid/blank votes		109	1.29	63	0.75
Dordrecht	Total votes		8,420	100	8,441	100
Dordrecht	Registered voters/turnout		9,867	85.33	9,867	85.55
Druten	T. J. A. Duijnstee	General League	3,248	60.18		
Druten	A. C. M. Rijke	General League	978	18.12		
Druten	H. C. Diferee	National League of Protestant Voters	953	17.66		
Druten	Z. D. J. W. Gulden	Social Democratic Workers' Party	160	2.96		
Druten	M. J. Wiessing	General League	58	1.07		
Druten	Valid votes		5,397	98.13		
Druten	Invalid/blank votes		103	1.87		
Druten	Total votes		5,500	100		
Druten	Registered voters/turnout		6,668	82.48		
Ede	G. J. A. Schimmelpenninck	Christian Historical Union	3,530	50.78		
Ede	A. baron van Heeckeren van Kell	Anti-Revolutionary Party	2,656	38.21		
Ede	H. C. Dresselhuys	League of Free Liberals	379	5.45		
Ede	A. van der Poel	Social Democratic Workers' Party	367	5.28		
Ede	M. Jongebreur	Anti-Revolutionary Party	19	0.27		
Ede	Valid votes		6,951	98.37		
Ede	Invalid/blank votes		115	1.63		
Ede	Total votes		7,066	100		
Ede	Registered voters/turnout		8,788	80.41		
Eindhoven	J. van Best	General League	5,751	89.97		
Eindhoven	H. Spiekman	Social Democratic Workers' Party	641	10.03		
Eindhoven	Valid votes		6,392	98.14		
Eindhoven	Invalid/blank votes		121	1.86		
Eindhoven	Total votes		6,513	100		
Eindhoven	Registered voters/turnout		8,816	73.88		
Elst	A. I. M. J. baron van Wijnbergen	General League	5,448	61.09		
Elst	P. J. Muller	National League of Protestant Voters	2,906	32.59		
Elst	J. W. Matthijsen	Social Democratic Workers' Party	421	4.72		
Elst	J. van der Veen	Christian Historical Union	143	1.6		
Elst	Valid votes		8,918	98.57		
Elst	Invalid/blank votes		129	1.43		
Elst	Total votes		9,047	100		
Elst	Registered voters/turnout		9,842	91.92		
Emmen	H. Goeman Borgesius	Liberal Union	4,685	54.71		
Emmen	G. Hofstede	Anti-Revolutionary Party	2,666	31.13		
Emmen	J. A. Bergmeyer	Social Democratic Workers' Party	1,212	14.15		
Emmen	Valid votes		8,563	98.75		
Emmen	Invalid/blank votes		108	1.25		
Emmen	Total votes		8,671	100		
Emmen	Registered voters/turnout		10,440	83.06		
Enkhuizen	N. Oosterbaan	Anti-Revolutionary Party	5,463	51.27		
Enkhuizen	F. C. J. Netscher	Free-thinking Democratic League	4,701	44.12		
Enkhuizen	J. H. Huijbers	Social Democratic Workers' Party	491	4.61		
Enkhuizen	Valid votes		10,655	99.57		
Enkhuizen	Invalid/blank votes		46	0.43		
Enkhuizen	Total votes		10,701	100		
Enkhuizen	Registered voters/turnout		10,937	97.84		
Enschede	G. Elhorst	Anti-Revolutionary Party	7,936	47.22	8,251	48.29
Enschede	J. W. Albarda	Social Democratic Workers' Party	5,325	31.69	8,836	51.71
Enschede	C. A. Zelvelder	Free-thinking Democratic League	3,349	19.93		
Enschede	H. Gorter	Social Democratic Party	196	1.17		
Enschede	Valid votes		16,806	98.55	17,087	99.43
Enschede	Invalid/blank votes		248	1.45	98	0.57
Enschede	Total votes		17,054	100	17,185	100
Enschede	Registered voters/turnout		17,895	95.3	17,895	96.03
Franeker	W. P. G. Helsdingen	Social Democratic Workers' Party	2,971	40.84	4,338	57.74
Franeker	A. Colijn Jr.	Anti-Revolutionary Party	2,795	38.42	3,175	42.26
Franeker	W. J. C. van Santen	Liberal Union	1,509	20.74		
Franeker	Valid votes		7,275	99.21	7,513	99.39
Franeker	Invalid/blank votes		58	0.79	46	0.61
Franeker	Total votes		7,333	100	7,559	100
Franeker	Registered voters/turnout		8,523	86.04	8,523	88.69
Goes	A. F. de Savornin Lohman	Christian Historical Union	3,922	52.63		
Goes	J. G. Moojen	Liberal Union	3,206	43.02		
Goes	G. Middelburg	Social Democratic Workers' Party	324	4.35		
Goes	Valid votes		7,452	98.56		
Goes	Invalid/blank votes		109	1.44		
Goes	Total votes		7,561	100		
Goes	Registered voters/turnout		8,435	89.64		
Gorinchem	A. C. Visser van Yzendoorn	League of Free Liberals	3,943	49.91	4,262	51.67
Gorinchem	P. E. Briët	Anti-Revolutionary Party	3,683	46.61	3,987	48.33
Gorinchem	J. A. Bergmeyer	Social Democratic Workers' Party	275	3.48		
Gorinchem	Valid votes		7,901	98.63	8,249	99.37
Gorinchem	Invalid/blank votes		110	1.37	52	0.63
Gorinchem	Total votes		8,011	100	8,301	100
Gorinchem	Registered voters/turnout		8,944	89.57	8,944	92.81
Gouda	W. T. C. van Doorn	Liberal Union	4,127	43.26	5,411	55.3
Gouda	J. A. de Wilde	Anti-Revolutionary Party	3,841	40.27	4,374	44.7
Gouda	A. Dijkgraaf	Social Democratic Workers' Party	999	10.47		
Gouda	G. Roos	Christian Historical Union	351	3.68		
Gouda	E. A. Keuchenius	Christian Social Party	221	2.32		
Gouda	Valid votes		9,539	98.78	9,785	99.27
Gouda	Invalid/blank votes		118	1.22	72	0.73
Gouda	Total votes		9,657	100	9,857	100
Gouda	Registered voters/turnout		10,711	90.16	10,711	92.03
Grave	D. A. P. N. Koolen	General League	Unopposed			
Groningen	D. Bos	Free-thinking Democratic League	3,760	43.02	4,171	55.62
Groningen	G. W. Sannes	Social Democratic Workers' Party	2,451	28.04	3,328	44.38
Groningen	J. Ankerman	Christian Historical Union	2,406	27.53		
Groningen	G. Sterringa	Social Democratic Party	124	1.42		
Groningen	Valid votes		8,741	98.46	7,499	99.13
Groningen	Invalid/blank votes		137	1.54	66	0.87
Groningen	Total votes		8,878	100	7,565	100
Groningen	Registered voters/turnout		10,452	84.94	10,452	72.38
Gulpen	C. J. M. Ruijs de Beerenbrouck	General League	4,856	68		
Gulpen	N. J. Schrijen	General League	1,774	24.84		
Gulpen	W. H. Vliegen	Social Democratic Workers' Party	213	2.98		
Gulpen	A. P. E. A. Wijmans	Independent	155	2.17		
Gulpen	J. Diepen	General League	143	2		
Gulpen	Valid votes		7,141	96.79		
Gulpen	Invalid/blank votes		237	3.21		
Gulpen	Total votes		7,378	100		
Gulpen	Registered voters/turnout		10,519	70.14		
Haarlem	D. E. van Lennep	Christian Historical Union	3,957	39.89	4,253	42.36
Haarlem	D. Fock	Liberal Union	2,901	29.25	5,788	57.64
Haarlem	P. J. Troelstra	Social Democratic Workers' Party	2,755	27.77		
Haarlem	W. H. Lieftinck	National League of Protestant Voters	291	2.93		
Haarlem	L. L. H. de Visser	Social Democratic Party	15	0.15		
Haarlem	Valid votes		9,919	98.79	10,041	99.63
Haarlem	Invalid/blank votes		121	1.21	37	0.37
Haarlem	Total votes		10,040	100	10,078	100
Haarlem	Registered voters/turnout		10,974	91.49	10,974	91.84
Haarlemmermeer	F. H. van Wichen	General League	6,926	57.09		
Haarlemmermeer	J. Korthals Altes	Liberal Union	3,927	32.37		
Haarlemmermeer	E. A. Keuchenius	Christian Social Party	743	6.12		
Haarlemmermeer	S. C. Rodrigues	Social Democratic Workers' Party	535	4.41		
Haarlemmermeer	Valid votes		12,131	99.33		
Haarlemmermeer	Invalid/blank votes		82	0.67		
Haarlemmermeer	Total votes		12,213	100		
Haarlemmermeer	Registered voters/turnout		13,290	91.9		
Harlingen	J. Ankerman	Christian Historical Union	3,697	51.92		
Harlingen	J. H. Anema	Social Democratic Workers' Party	1,730	24.29		
Harlingen	A. D. H. Fockema Andreae	League of Free Liberals	1,694	23.79		
Harlingen	Valid votes		7,121	99.01		
Harlingen	Invalid/blank votes		71	0.99		
Harlingen	Total votes		7,192	100		
Harlingen	Registered voters/turnout		7,991	90		
Helmond	A. N. Fleskens	General League	Unopposed			
Hilversum	V. H. Rutgers	Anti-Revolutionary Party	6,507	50.63		
Hilversum	W. J. E. H. M. de Jong	Liberal Union	4,367	33.98		
Hilversum	T. van der Waerden	Social Democratic Workers' Party	1,160	9.03		
Hilversum	Æ. baron van Mackay	Christian Historical Union	710	5.52		
Hilversum	G. A. Vader	Social Democratic Party	108	0.84		
Hilversum	Valid votes		12,852	98.63		
Hilversum	Invalid/blank votes		178	1.37		
Hilversum	Total votes		13,030	100		
Hilversum	Registered voters/turnout		14,839	87.81		
Hontenisse	P. F. Fruijtier	General League	3,794	51.36		
Hontenisse	J. Welleman	Free-thinking Democratic League	2,289	30.99		
Hontenisse	H. A. van Dalsum	General League	1,222	16.54		
Hontenisse	J. Ossewaarde	Social Democratic Workers' Party	82	1.11		
Hontenisse	Valid votes		7,387	96.15		
Hontenisse	Invalid/blank votes		296	3.85		
Hontenisse	Total votes		7,683	100		
Hontenisse	Registered voters/turnout		8,545	89.91		
Hoogezand	H. Spiekman	Social Democratic Workers' Party	2,575	40.59	2,845	55.06
Hoogezand	P. Rink	Liberal Union	2,124	33.48	2,322	44.94
Hoogezand	R. Koppe	Anti-Revolutionary Party	1,645	25.93		
Hoogezand	Valid votes		6,344	98.6	5,167	98.83
Hoogezand	Invalid/blank votes		90	1.4	61	1.17
Hoogezand	Total votes		6,434	100	5,228	100
Hoogezand	Registered voters/turnout		7,594	84.72	7,594	68.84
Hoorn	W. J. E. H. M. de Jong	Liberal Union	3,859	48.63	5,174	64.11
Hoorn	C. D. Wesseling	General League	2,920	36.79	2,897	35.89
Hoorn	L. Hoejenbos	Social Democratic Workers' Party	1,157	14.58		
Hoorn	Valid votes		7,936	99.5	8,071	99.49
Hoorn	Invalid/blank votes		40	0.5	41	0.51
Hoorn	Total votes		7,976	100	8,112	100
Hoorn	Registered voters/turnout		9,070	87.94	9,070	89.44
Kampen	E. J. Beumer	Anti-Revolutionary Party	3,430	48.71	3,877	51.01
Kampen	J. C. de Gast	Liberal Union	2,430	34.51	3,724	48.99
Kampen	J. C. B. Eykman	Christian Social Party	660	9.37		
Kampen	J. H. A. Schaper	Social Democratic Workers' Party	371	5.27		
Kampen	P. Tideman	League of Free Liberals	137	1.95		
Kampen	N. J. Bosch	Liberal Union	14	0.2		
Kampen	Valid votes		7,042	98.23	7,601	99.09
Kampen	Invalid/blank votes		127	1.77	70	0.91
Kampen	Total votes		7,169	100	7,671	100
Kampen	Registered voters/turnout		8,093	88.58	8,093	94.79
Katwijk	O. J. E. baron van Wassenaer van Catwijck	Christian Historical Union	6,663	81.42		
Katwijk	J. C. Kielstra	League of Free Liberals	1,158	14.15		
Katwijk	S. R. Rodrigues de Miranda	Social Democratic Workers' Party	227	2.77		
Katwijk	P. J. Muller	National League of Protestant Voters	135	1.65		
Katwijk	Valid votes		8,183	97.81		
Katwijk	Invalid/blank votes		183	2.19		
Katwijk	Total votes		8,366	100		
Katwijk	Registered voters/turnout		10,379	80.61		
Leeuwarden	P. J. Troelstra	Social Democratic Workers' Party	3,738	46.46	3,851	56.19
Leeuwarden	L. W. J. K. Thomson	Liberal Union	2,622	32.59	3,002	43.81
Leeuwarden	W. Fransen Jzn.	General League	1,685	20.94		
Leeuwarden	Valid votes		8,045	99.43	6,853	99.32
Leeuwarden	Invalid/blank votes		46	0.57	47	0.68
Leeuwarden	Total votes		8,091	100	6,900	100
Leeuwarden	Registered voters/turnout		9,228	87.68	9,228	74.77
Leiden	P. E. Briët	Anti-Revolutionary Party	3,234	48.19	3,447	49.34
Leiden	J. E. Heeres	Liberal Union	2,689	40.07	3,539	50.66
Leiden	T. van der Waerden	Social Democratic Workers' Party	557	8.3		
Leiden	J. C. B. Eykman	Christian Social Party	148	2.21		
Leiden	L. L. H. de Visser	Social Democratic Party	83	1.24		
Leiden	Valid votes		6,711	98.84	6,986	99.28
Leiden	Invalid/blank votes		79	1.16	51	0.72
Leiden	Total votes		6,790	100	7,037	100
Leiden	Registered voters/turnout		7,460	91.02	7,460	94.33
Lochem	G. Jannink	Liberal Union	3,911	42.36	5,889	63.89
Lochem	A. baron van Heeckeren van Kell	Anti-Revolutionary Party	3,283	35.56	3,328	36.11
Lochem	J. van Leeuwen	Social Democratic Workers' Party	2,039	22.08		
Lochem	Valid votes		9,233	98.73	9,217	99.22
Lochem	Invalid/blank votes		119	1.27	72	0.78
Lochem	Total votes		9,352	100	9,289	100
Lochem	Registered voters/turnout		10,519	88.91	10,519	88.31
Loosduinen	A. Brummelkamp Jr.	Anti-Revolutionary Party	6,234	68.94		
Loosduinen	F. M. Knobel	League of Free Liberals	2,374	26.26		
Loosduinen	J. H. A. Schaper	Social Democratic Workers' Party	434	4.8		
Loosduinen	Valid votes		9,042	98.41		
Loosduinen	Invalid/blank votes		146	1.59		
Loosduinen	Total votes		9,188	100		
Loosduinen	Registered voters/turnout		11,107	82.72		
Maastricht	F. I. J. Janssen	General League	4,325	64.02		
Maastricht	W. C. de Jonge	Social Democratic Workers' Party	1,635	24.2		
Maastricht	G. Nijpels	Free-thinking Democratic League	741	10.97		
Maastricht	D. J. Wijnkoop	Social Democratic Party	55	0.81		
Maastricht	Valid votes		6,756	97.91		
Maastricht	Invalid/blank votes		144	2.09		
Maastricht	Total votes		6,900	100		
Maastricht	Registered voters/turnout		8,593	80.3		
Meppel	H. Smeenge	Liberal Union	3,326	50.9		
Meppel	F. Fokkens	Christian Historical Union	2,339	35.8		
Meppel	A. van der Heide	Social Democratic Workers' Party	869	13.3		
Meppel	Valid votes		6,534	98.51		
Meppel	Invalid/blank votes		99	1.49		
Meppel	Total votes		6,633	100		
Meppel	Registered voters/turnout		7,983	83.09		
Middelburg	J. H. Blum	Anti-Revolutionary Party	4,886	48.12	5,107	48.05
Middelburg	E. E. van Raalte	Liberal Union	4,070	40.08	5,521	51.95
Middelburg	G. F. Lindeijer	Social Democratic Workers' Party	1,198	11.8		
Middelburg	Valid votes		10,154	98.69	10,628	99.6
Middelburg	Invalid/blank votes		135	1.31	43	0.4
Middelburg	Total votes		10,289	100	10,671	100
Middelburg	Registered voters/turnout		11,293	91.11	11,293	94.49
Nijmegen	O. F. A. M. van Nispen tot Sevenaer	General League	4,439	67.52		
Nijmegen	J. E. W. Duijs	Social Democratic Workers' Party	1,362	20.72		
Nijmegen	J. E. Stork II	League of Free Liberals	611	9.29		
Nijmegen	A. R. van de Laar	Christian Social Party	162	2.46		
Nijmegen	Valid votes		6,574	98.87		
Nijmegen	Invalid/blank votes		75	1.13		
Nijmegen	Total votes		6,649	100		
Nijmegen	Registered voters/turnout		9,053	73.45		
Ommen	C. J. A. Bichon van Ysselmonde	Independent Christian Historical	4,469	49.26	5,078	53
Ommen	J. T. de Visser	Christian Historical Union	4,337	47.8	4,504	47
Ommen	G. Schotveld	Social Democratic Workers' Party	207	2.28		
Ommen	B. Berends	Christian Historical Union	60	0.66		
Ommen	Valid votes		9,073	98.05	9,582	99.49
Ommen	Invalid/blank votes		180	1.95	49	0.51
Ommen	Total votes		9,253	100	9,631	100
Ommen	Registered voters/turnout		10,304	89.8	10,304	93.47
Oostburg	R. R. L. de Muralt	Liberal Union	4,710	55.7		
Oostburg	P. Dieleman	Anti-Revolutionary Party	3,519	41.62		
Oostburg	G. F. Lindeijer	Social Democratic Workers' Party	227	2.68		
Oostburg	Valid votes		8,456	98.26		
Oostburg	Invalid/blank votes		150	1.74		
Oostburg	Total votes		8,606	100		
Oostburg	Registered voters/turnout		9,328	92.26		
Oosterhout	I. B. D. van den Berch van Heemstede	General League	5,110	89.79		
Oosterhout	G. W. Kernkamp	Free-thinking Democratic League	376	6.61		
Oosterhout	H. A. Koomans	Social Democratic Workers' Party	205	3.6		
Oosterhout	Valid votes		5,691	98.84		
Oosterhout	Invalid/blank votes		67	1.16		
Oosterhout	Total votes		5,758	100		
Oosterhout	Registered voters/turnout		8,218	70.07		
Rheden	J. W. J. C. M. van Nispen tot Sevenaer	General League	4,564	79.53		
Rheden	L. M. Hermans	Social Democratic Workers' Party	1,175	20.47		
Rheden	Valid votes		5,739	97.47		
Rheden	Invalid/blank votes		149	2.53		
Rheden	Total votes		5,888	100		
Rheden	Registered voters/turnout		8,548	68.88		
Ridderkerk	A. P. R. C. baron van Borch van Verwolde	Anti-Revolutionary Party	4,060	47.92	4,333	49.58
Ridderkerk	F. J. W. Drion	League of Free Liberals	3,742	44.16	4,407	50.42
Ridderkerk	A. R. van de Laar	Christian Social Party	399	4.71		
Ridderkerk	J. H. F. van Zadelhoff	Social Democratic Workers' Party	272	3.21		
Ridderkerk	Valid votes		8,473	98.61	8,740	99.64
Ridderkerk	Invalid/blank votes		119	1.39	32	0.36
Ridderkerk	Total votes		8,592	100	8,772	100
Ridderkerk	Registered voters/turnout		9,083	94.59	9,083	96.58
Roermond	M. C. E. Bongaerts	General League	3,783	60.44		
Roermond	J. T. Verheggen	General League	2,476	39.56		
Roermond	Valid votes		6,259	98.64		
Roermond	Invalid/blank votes		86	1.36		
Roermond	Total votes		6,345	100		
Roermond	Registered voters/turnout		7,541	84.14		
Rotterdam I	H. Spiekman	Social Democratic Workers' Party	3,739	38.4	5,576	55.19
Rotterdam I	B. J. Gerretson	Christian Historical Union	3,605	37.02	4,528	44.81
Rotterdam I	H. Goeman Borgesius	Liberal Union	2,246	23.07		
Rotterdam I	E. A. Keuchenius	Christian Social Party	109	1.12		
Rotterdam I	D. J. Wijnkoop	Social Democratic Party	38	0.39		
Rotterdam I	Valid votes		9,737	98.77	10,104	99.09
Rotterdam I	Invalid/blank votes		121	1.23	93	0.91
Rotterdam I	Total votes		9,858	100	10,197	100
Rotterdam I	Registered voters/turnout		12,248	80.49	12,248	83.25
Rotterdam II	W. B. van Staveren	Anti-Revolutionary Party	4,431	39.65	5,322	46.48
Rotterdam II	H. Spiekman	Social Democratic Workers' Party	3,395	30.38	6,129	53.52
Rotterdam II	D. de Klerk	Liberal Union	3,349	29.97		
Rotterdam II	Valid votes		11,175	98.96	11,451	98.81
Rotterdam II	Invalid/blank votes		117	1.04	138	1.19
Rotterdam II	Total votes		11,292	100	11,589	100
Rotterdam II	Registered voters/turnout		13,625	82.88	13,625	85.06
Rotterdam III	J. H. Lasonder	Liberal Union	2,521	53.66		
Rotterdam III	H. Stulemeijer	General League	1,731	36.85		
Rotterdam III	J. Loopuit	Social Democratic Workers' Party	446	9.49		
Rotterdam III	Valid votes		4,698	98.51		
Rotterdam III	Invalid/blank votes		71	1.49		
Rotterdam III	Total votes		4,769	100		
Rotterdam III	Registered voters/turnout		5,734	83.17		
Rotterdam IV	J. F. Heemskerk	Anti-Revolutionary Party	4,856	34.21	5,532	38.3
Rotterdam IV	J. van Vollenhoven	League of Free Liberals	4,630	32.62	8,913	61.7
Rotterdam IV	A. B. de Zeeuw	Social Democratic Workers' Party	4,435	31.25		
Rotterdam IV	A. R. van de Laar	Christian Social Party	227	1.6		
Rotterdam IV	W. van Ravesteijn Jr.	Social Democratic Party	46	0.32		
Rotterdam IV	Valid votes		14,194	99.23	14,445	99.61
Rotterdam IV	Invalid/blank votes		110	0.77	56	0.39
Rotterdam IV	Total votes		14,304	100	14,501	100
Rotterdam IV	Registered voters/turnout		17,817	80.28	17,817	81.39
Rotterdam V	A. de Jong	Independent	2,556	37.95	3,148	43.97
Rotterdam V	J. ter Laan	Social Democratic Workers' Party	2,103	31.22	4,011	56.03
Rotterdam V	D. Fock	Liberal Union	2,012	29.87		
Rotterdam V	W. van Ravesteijn Jr.	Social Democratic Party	65	0.96		
Rotterdam V	Valid votes		6,736	98.99	7,159	98.88
Rotterdam V	Invalid/blank votes		69	1.01	81	1.12
Rotterdam V	Total votes		6,805	100	7,240	100
Rotterdam V	Registered voters/turnout		8,828	77.08	8,828	82.01
Schiedam	D. J. de Geer	Christian Historical Union	4,017	51.3		
Schiedam	J. H. Gunning Wzn.	Liberal Union	2,678	34.2		
Schiedam	P. de Bruin	Social Democratic Workers' Party	1,136	14.51		
Schiedam	Valid votes		7,831	98.91		
Schiedam	Invalid/blank votes		86	1.09		
Schiedam	Total votes		7,917	100		
Schiedam	Registered voters/turnout		9,215	85.91		
Schoterland	M. Mendels	Social Democratic Workers' Party	2,859	47.22	3,200	58.76
Schoterland	J. Limburg	Free-thinking Democratic League	1,733	28.62	2,246	41.24
Schoterland	C. Smeenk	Anti-Revolutionary Party	1,463	24.16		
Schoterland	Valid votes		6,055	99.26	5,446	99.45
Schoterland	Invalid/blank votes		45	0.74	30	0.55
Schoterland	Total votes		6,100	100	5,476	100
Schoterland	Registered voters/turnout		7,812	78.08	7,812	70.1
Sittard	J. H. J. Beckers	General League	4,548	63.99		
Sittard	A. H. Gijzels	General League	2,559	36.01		
Sittard	Valid votes		7,107	98.23		
Sittard	Invalid/blank votes		128	1.77		
Sittard	Total votes		7,235	100		
Sittard	Registered voters/turnout		8,961	80.74		
Sliedrecht	J. van der Molen Tz.	Anti-Revolutionary Party	3,445	52.61		
Sliedrecht	W. W. van der Meulen	League of Free Liberals	2,542	38.82		
Sliedrecht	A. Dijkgraaf	Social Democratic Workers' Party	561	8.57		
Sliedrecht	Valid votes		6,548	98.45		
Sliedrecht	Invalid/blank votes		103	1.55		
Sliedrecht	Total votes		6,651	100		
Sliedrecht	Registered voters/turnout		8,814	75.46		
Sneek	J. G. Scheurer	Anti-Revolutionary Party	3,703	52.5		
Sneek	C. E. van Koetsveld	Independent Christian Historical	1,195	16.94		
Sneek	J. C. Kielstra	League of Free Liberals	1,190	16.87		
Sneek	A. van der Heide	Social Democratic Workers' Party	966	13.69		
Sneek	Valid votes		7,054	99.14		
Sneek	Invalid/blank votes		61	0.86		
Sneek	Total votes		7,115	100		
Sneek	Registered voters/turnout		8,222	86.54		
Steenwijk	L. F. Duymaer van Twist	Anti-Revolutionary Party	3,721	51.2		
Steenwijk	E. van Ketwich Verschuur	Liberal Union	3,196	43.97		
Steenwijk	B. Boers	Social Democratic Workers' Party	351	4.83		
Steenwijk	Valid votes		7,268	98.59		
Steenwijk	Invalid/blank votes		104	1.41		
Steenwijk	Total votes		7,372	100		
Steenwijk	Registered voters/turnout		7,976	92.43		
Tiel	M. Tydeman Jr.	League of Free Liberals	3,279	56.22		
Tiel	C. Smeenk	Anti-Revolutionary Party	1,600	27.43		
Tiel	L. M. Hermans	Social Democratic Workers' Party	953	16.34		
Tiel	Valid votes		5,832	98.61		
Tiel	Invalid/blank votes		82	1.39		
Tiel	Total votes		5,914	100		
Tiel	Registered voters/turnout		6,816	86.77		
Tietjerksteradeel	C. van der Voort van Zijp	Anti-Revolutionary Party	4,137	51.87		
Tietjerksteradeel	J. H. Faber	Liberal Union	2,238	28.06		
Tietjerksteradeel	W. H. Vliegen	Social Democratic Workers' Party	1,601	20.07		
Tietjerksteradeel	Valid votes		7,976	98.97		
Tietjerksteradeel	Invalid/blank votes		83	1.03		
Tietjerksteradeel	Total votes		8,059	100		
Tietjerksteradeel	Registered voters/turnout		8,967	89.87		
Tilburg	A. H. A. Arts	General League	4,290	76.84		
Tilburg	J. van Rijzewijk	General League	850	15.22		
Tilburg	J. A. Bergmeyer	Social Democratic Workers' Party	443	7.93		
Tilburg	Valid votes		5,583	98.66		
Tilburg	Invalid/blank votes		76	1.34		
Tilburg	Total votes		5,659	100		
Tilburg	Registered voters/turnout		8,598	65.82		
Utrecht I	W. C. baron van Roëll	Christian Historical Union	3,688	41.89	3,745	42.16
Utrecht I	J. H. W. Q. ter Spill	League of Free Liberals	3,569	40.53	5,138	57.84
Utrecht I	A. van der Heide	Social Democratic Workers' Party	1,548	17.58		
Utrecht I	Valid votes		8,805	98.7	8,883	99.41
Utrecht I	Invalid/blank votes		116	1.3	53	0.59
Utrecht I	Total votes		8,921	100	8,936	100
Utrecht I	Registered voters/turnout		9,767	91.34	9,767	91.49
Utrecht II	J. S. F. van Hoogstraten	Anti-Revolutionary Party	3,522	45.63	3,765	47.62
Utrecht II	J. van Leeuwen	Social Democratic Workers' Party	2,668	34.57	4,142	52.38
Utrecht II	C. Lely	Liberal Union	1,512	19.59		
Utrecht II	J. van den Berg	Social Democratic Party	16	0.21		
Utrecht II	Valid votes		7,718	98.11	7,907	99.17
Utrecht II	Invalid/blank votes		149	1.89	66	0.83
Utrecht II	Total votes		7,867	100	7,973	100
Utrecht II	Registered voters/turnout		8,540	92.12	8,540	93.36
Veendam	G. W. Sannes	Social Democratic Workers' Party	3,156	41.47	3,472	56.96
Veendam	H. Snijders	Free-thinking Democratic League	2,272	29.86	2,624	43.04
Veendam	F. G. Petersen	Anti-Revolutionary Party	2,182	28.67		
Veendam	Valid votes		7,610	98.74	6,096	98.72
Veendam	Invalid/blank votes		97	1.26	79	1.28
Veendam	Total votes		7,707	100	6,175	100
Veendam	Registered voters/turnout		9,054	85.12	9,054	68.2
Veghel	B. R. F. van Vlijmen	General League	Unopposed			
Venlo	W. H. Nolens	General League	6,087	93.3		
Venlo	J. A. Rosenveldt	Social Democratic Workers' Party	437	6.7		
Venlo	Valid votes		6,524	99.01		
Venlo	Invalid/blank votes		65	0.99		
Venlo	Total votes		6,589	100		
Venlo	Registered voters/turnout		8,285	79.53		
Waalwijk	J. A. Loeff	General League	4,842	82.03		
Waalwijk	H. Prinsen	General League	988	16.74		
Waalwijk	W. H. Vliegen	Social Democratic Workers' Party	73	1.24		
Waalwijk	Valid votes		5,903	98.7		
Waalwijk	Invalid/blank votes		78	1.3		
Waalwijk	Total votes		5,981	100		
Waalwijk	Registered voters/turnout		6,932	86.28		
Weert	V. E. L. de Stuers	General League	Unopposed			
Weststellingwerf	F. W. N. Hugenholtz	Social Democratic Workers' Party	2,638	41.32	2,986	54.46
Weststellingwerf	P. Kohnstamm	Free-thinking Democratic League	2,076	32.51	2,497	45.54
Weststellingwerf	J. de Bruijn	Anti-Revolutionary Party	1,671	26.17		
Weststellingwerf	Valid votes		6,385	99.12	5,483	99.19
Weststellingwerf	Invalid/blank votes		57	0.88	45	0.81
Weststellingwerf	Total votes		6,442	100	5,528	100
Weststellingwerf	Registered voters/turnout		7,878	81.77	7,878	70.17
Wijk bij Duurstede	J. B. L. C. C. baron de Wijkerslooth de Weerdesteyn	General League	4,698	53.67		
Wijk bij Duurstede	H. C. Dresselhuys	League of Free Liberals	3,062	34.98		
Wijk bij Duurstede	E. A. Keuchenius	Christian Social Party	710	8.11		
Wijk bij Duurstede	J. van Leeuwen	Social Democratic Workers' Party	284	3.24		
Wijk bij Duurstede	Valid votes		8,754	98.35		
Wijk bij Duurstede	Invalid/blank votes		147	1.65		
Wijk bij Duurstede	Total votes		8,901	100		
Wijk bij Duurstede	Registered voters/turnout		9,630	92.43		
Winschoten	D. Bos	Free-thinking Democratic League	2,396	41.98	3,172	55.56
Winschoten	L. M. Hermans	Social Democratic Workers' Party	2,303	40.35	2,537	44.44
Winschoten	F. G. Petersen	Anti-Revolutionary Party	1,009	17.68		
Winschoten	Valid votes		5,708	98.89	5,709	99.37
Winschoten	Invalid/blank votes		64	1.11	36	0.63
Winschoten	Total votes		5,772	100	5,745	100
Winschoten	Registered voters/turnout		8,016	72.01	8,016	71.67
Zaandam	J. E. W. Duijs	Social Democratic Workers' Party	5,389	48.94	5,495	60.05
Zaandam	J. Limburg	Free-thinking Democratic League	3,073	27.91	3,655	39.95
Zaandam	J. A. de Wilde	Anti-Revolutionary Party	2,549	23.15		
Zaandam	Valid votes		11,011	99.09	9,150	98.87
Zaandam	Invalid/blank votes		101	0.91	105	1.13
Zaandam	Total votes		11,112	100	9,255	100
Zaandam	Registered voters/turnout		12,441	89.32	12,441	74.39
Zevenbergen	A. C. A. van Vuuren	General League	Unopposed			
Zierikzee	R. J. H. Patijn	Liberal Union	4,361	53.65		
Zierikzee	H. C. Hogerzeil	Anti-Revolutionary Party	3,244	39.91		
Zierikzee	H. A. Koomans	Social Democratic Workers' Party	524	6.45		
Zierikzee	Valid votes		8,129	99.04		
Zierikzee	Invalid/blank votes		79	0.96		
Zierikzee	Total votes		8,208	100		
Zierikzee	Registered voters/turnout		8,974	91.46		
Zuidhorn	E. M. Teenstra	Free-thinking Democratic League	4,116	48.84	4,783	58.14
Zuidhorn	A. Zijlstra	Anti-Revolutionary Party	3,627	43.04	3,444	41.86
Zuidhorn	P. Hiemstra	Social Democratic Workers' Party	685	8.13		
Zuidhorn	Valid votes		8,428	99.06	8,227	99.58
Zuidhorn	Invalid/blank votes		80	0.94	35	0.42
Zuidhorn	Total votes		8,508	100	8,262	100
Zuidhorn	Registered voters/turnout		9,324	91.25	9,324	88.61
Zutphen	F. Lieftinck	Liberal Union	3,715	45.64	4,927	60.29
Zutphen	J. R. Snoeck Henkemans	Christian Historical Union	3,355	41.22	3,245	39.71
Zutphen	F. M. Wibaut	Social Democratic Workers' Party	1,069	13.13		
Zutphen	Valid votes		8,139	98.31	8,172	99.02
Zutphen	Invalid/blank votes		140	1.69	81	0.98
Zutphen	Total votes		8,279	100	8,253	100
Zutphen	Registered voters/turnout		9,043	91.55	9,043	91.26
Zwolle	A. baron van Dedem	Christian Historical Union	3,883	49.87	4,223	49.85
Zwolle	F. M. Knobel	League of Free Liberals	2,587	33.23	4,249	50.15
Zwolle	J. van Leeuwen	Social Democratic Workers' Party	1,284	16.49		
Zwolle	B. Luteraan	Social Democratic Party	32	0.41		
Zwolle	Valid votes		7,786	98.59	8,472	99.48
Zwolle	Invalid/blank votes		111	1.41	44	0.52
Zwolle	Total votes		7,897	100	8,516	100
Zwolle	Registered voters/turnout		8,889	88.84	8,889	95.8
