= Meinard Tydeman =

Dutch politician (1854–1916)

- Meinard Tydeman in 1913

Member of the House of Representatives
- In office 14 December 1891 – 20 March 1894
- In office 16 May 1894 – 4 November 1916
- Preceded by: Herman Jacob Dijckmeester
- Succeeded by: Hendrik Coenraad Dresselhuijs
- Constituency: Tiel

Personal details
- Born: Meinard Tydeman Jr. 6 March 1854 Tiel, Netherlands
- Died: 4 November 1916 (aged 62) Hilvarenbeek, Netherlands
- Party: Liberal Union (until 1894); League of Free Liberals (1906–1916)
- Spouse: Joanna Maria VerLoren van Themaat (m. 1882)
- Children: 2
- Education: Utrecht University

Meinard "Map" Tydeman Jr. (6 March 1854 – 4 November 1916) was a Dutch politician. From 1891 to 1916, Tydeman was a member of the Dutch House of Representatives for the Tiel electoral district initially for the Liberal Union and later for the League of Free Liberals. He became the League of Free Liberals's first leader and headed its parliamentary group in the House of Representatives.

== Early life ==
Meinard Tydeman Jr. was born on 6 March 1854 in Tiel to Meinard Tydeman, a lawyer and a liberal member of the Provincial Council of Gelderland from 1876 to 1904, and Henriëtte Ewaldine Hélène Reuchlin, who died when Meinard Tydeman Jr was two years old. He grew up in a wealthy Protestant environment. Tydeman studied law at Utrecht University, obtaining his PhD in 1880. He subsequently became a lawyer in Breda, and in 1887 was appointed as a deputy judge there. Tydeman also served as school inspector in the Zevenbergen district from 1883 to 1894.

== Political career ==
In the late 1880s, Tydeman became increasingly involved in politics. In the 1886 Dutch general election, Tydeman first ran for a seat in the House of Representatives in the overwhelmingly Catholic Breda electoral district, but lost. Following several other failed attempts, Tydeman defeated former prime minister Æneas Mackay in 1891 to become the representative of the Tiel electoral district. Popular among the electorate in Tiel due to his status as a "Tiel boy", the district would re-elect him in every election until his death. He was a member of the Liberal Union, having served in the party's executive since 1886.

As an MP, Tydeman spoke on various issues, including education, justice, finance, and defense. Tydeman was a conservative liberal, generally opposed to government intervention in individual affairs, but did support government funding of infrastructure and some social legislation. He strongly opposed both the "power of the state machine" embodied by socialism as well as the political power of the Roman Catholic Church, becoming known as a fierce anti-Catholic.

In 1893 and 1894, Tydeman became a partial supporter of Johannes Tak van Poortvliet's efforts to expand the franchise, wanting the extension of the vote to every man able to support himself and his family. He resigned from the executive of the Liberal Union however after it had called for local electoral associations to solely endorse full supporters of Tak van Poortvliet's proposals. He later supported Samuel van Houten's law allowing for a more moderate extension of the franchise in 1896.

In 1905, Tydeman was the first signatory of the founding manifesto of the conservative liberal League of Free Liberals, and following its official founding the year after became the party's first leader. As leader of the League of Free Liberals, Tydeman was opposed to universal suffrage as long as the political influence of the unelected Senate was not increased at the same time. In 1906, Tydeman played a crucial role in saving the De Meester cabinet following a controversial proposal by minister of war Henri Staal in what became known as the Night of Staal. In 1913, he helped establish an electoral agreement between the League of Free Liberals, the Liberal Union and the Free-thinking Democratic League. He was also an opponent of religious schools, writing the minority report as part of a government commission which had proposed equalizing funding between religious and state schools because it would advantage religious education too much.

Meinard Tydeman died on 4 November 1916 while on a hunting trip in Hilvarenbeek.

== Personal life ==
Tydeman married Joanna Maria VerLoren van Themaat on 9 June 1882. The couple had two sons together.

Tydeman was known for his artistic abilities, drawing caricatures of his fellow MPs during sessions of the House of Representatives and playing the violin. He was also a passionate hunter.

He was an commander in the Order of Orange-Nassau, and a knight in the Order of the Netherlands Lion.
