= 1909 Dutch general election =

- 11 June 1909 (first round); 23 June 1909 (second round)
- All 100 seats in the House of Representatives; 51 seats needed for a majority
- Turnout: 78.76% (first round); 80.63% (second round)
Party	Leader	Seats	+/–
AB	Jan Loeff	25	0
LU	Hendrik Goeman Borgesius	21	−4
ARP	Abraham Kuyper	21	+6
CHU	Alexander de Savornin Lohman	12	+4
VDB	Hendrik Lodewijk Drucker	8	−2
SDAP	Pieter Jelles Troelstra	7	0
BVL	Meinard Tydeman	4	−6
Independent	—	2	+2
This lists parties that won seats. See the complete results below.
Cabinet before	Cabinet after
De Meester cabinet Liberal	Theo Heemskerk cabinet Coalition

General elections were held in the Netherlands on 11 June 1909, with a second round in some constituencies on 23 June. The General League of Roman Catholic Electoral Associations emerged as the largest party, winning 25 of the 100 seats in the House of Representatives.

== Electoral system ==
The 100 seats in the House of Representatives were elected in single-member constituencies using the two-round system.

== Results ==
Party	First round			Second round			Total seats
Party	Votes	%	Seats	Votes	%	Seats	Total seats
Anti-Revolutionary Party	158,105	26.53	19	62,515	24.25	2	21
Liberal Union	112,533	18.88	6	68,470	26.56	15	21
General League	81,953	13.75	25	7,500	2.91	0	25
Social Democratic Workers' Party	81,836	13.73	0	41,082	15.94	7	7
Christian Historical Union	63,306	10.62	9	23,955	9.29	3	12
Free-thinking Democratic League	55,153	9.25	3	24,903	9.66	5	8
League of Free Liberals	29,739	4.99	1	19,409	7.53	3	4
Christian Democratic Party	2,950	0.49	0	3,282	1.27	0	0
Social Democratic Party	383	0.06	0				0
Independent	10,102	1.69	1	6,679	2.59	1	2
Total	596,060	100.00	64	257,795	100.00	36	100
Valid votes	596,060	98.57		257,795	99.17		
Invalid/blank votes	8,639	1.43		2,161	0.83		
Total votes	604,699	100.00		259,956	100.00		
Registered voters/turnout	767,732	78.76		322,403	80.63		
Source: Kiesraad, Huygens

Several candidates ran in multiple districts. When they won in more than one seat they picked which seat to take. As a result, several by-elections took place shortly after the general election.

=== By district ===
Results by district
District	Candidate	Party	First round		Second round	
District	Candidate	Party	Votes	%	Votes	%
Alkmaar	N. Glinderman	Anti-Revolutionary Party	3,562	40.17	3,759	43.15
Alkmaar	P. van Foreest	League of Free Liberals	2,806	31.65	4,953	56.85
Alkmaar	F. C. J. Netscher	Free-thinking Democratic League	2,245	25.32		
Alkmaar	J. G. van Kuykhof	Social Democratic Workers' Party	254	2.86		
Alkmaar	Valid votes		8,867	98.65	8,712	99.33
Alkmaar	Invalid/blank votes		121	1.35	59	0.67
Alkmaar	Total votes		8,988	100	8,771	100
Alkmaar	Registered voters/turnout		10,270	87.52	10,270	85.40
Almelo	P. J. M. Aalberse	General League	4,744	67.81		
Almelo	D. van der Sluis	Liberal Union	1,614	23.07		
Almelo	J. W. Albarda	Social Democratic Workers' Party	638	9.12		
Almelo	Valid votes		6,996	97.22		
Almelo	Invalid/blank votes		200	2.78		
Almelo	Total votes		7,196	100		
Almelo	Registered voters/turnout		9,087	79.19		
Amersfoort	H. W. van Asch van Wijck	Anti-Revolutionary Party	4,725	60.40		
Amersfoort	W. H. de Beaufort	League of Free Liberals	2,469	31.56		
Amersfoort	J. van Leeuwen	Social Democratic Workers' Party	629	8.04		
Amersfoort	Valid votes		7,823	98.81		
Amersfoort	Invalid/blank votes		94	1.19		
Amersfoort	Total votes		7,917	100		
Amersfoort	Registered voters/turnout		10,300	76.86		
Amsterdam I	H. F. R. Hubrecht	Liberal Union	1,862	52.07		
Amsterdam I	J. N. Hendrix	General League	1,400	39.15		
Amsterdam I	P. C. F. Frowein	Social Democratic Workers' Party	314	8.78		
Amsterdam I	Valid votes		3,576	97.31		
Amsterdam I	Invalid/blank votes		99	2.69		
Amsterdam I	Total votes		3,675	100		
Amsterdam I	Registered voters/turnout		5,180	70.95		
Amsterdam II	J. R. Snoeck Henkemans	Christian Historical Union	1,236	41.64	1,755	53.04
Amsterdam II	J. Oudegeest	Social Democratic Workers' Party	926	31.20	1,554	46.96
Amsterdam II	C. Lely	Liberal Union	806	27.16		
Amsterdam II	Valid votes		2,968	97.82	3,309	98.81
Amsterdam II	Invalid/blank votes		66	2.18	40	1.19
Amsterdam II	Total votes		3,034	100	3,349	100
Amsterdam II	Registered voters/turnout		4,404	68.89	4,404	76.04
Amsterdam III	P. J. Troelstra	Social Democratic Workers' Party	4,680	49.17	5,691	56.26
Amsterdam III	G. A. van Hamel	Liberal Union	2,507	26.34	4,424	43.74
Amsterdam III	J. Huizinga	Anti-Revolutionary Party	2,172	22.82		
Amsterdam III	D. J. Wijnkoop	Independent	159	1.67		
Amsterdam III	Valid votes		9,518	97.61	10,115	99.28
Amsterdam III	Invalid/blank votes		233	2.39	73	0.72
Amsterdam III	Total votes		9,751	100	10,188	100
Amsterdam III	Registered voters/turnout		13,120	74.32	13,120	77.65
Amsterdam IV	J. W. Ijzerman	Liberal Union	1,603	54.34		
Amsterdam IV	J. E. W. Duijs	Social Democratic Workers' Party	961	32.58		
Amsterdam IV	H. W. Hovy	Anti-Revolutionary Party	386	13.08		
Amsterdam IV	Valid votes		2,950	97.10		
Amsterdam IV	Invalid/blank votes		88	2.90		
Amsterdam IV	Total votes		3,038	100		
Amsterdam IV	Registered voters/turnout		4,290	70.82		
Amsterdam V	T. M. Ketelaar	Free-thinking Democratic League	3,294	36.23	5,988	66.67
Amsterdam V	P. J. M. Aalberse	General League	2,645	29.09	2,994	33.33
Amsterdam V	J. G. van Kuykhof	Social Democratic Workers' Party	2,145	23.59		
Amsterdam V	N. Bosboom	League of Free Liberals	1,007	11.08		
Amsterdam V	Valid votes		9,091	98.36	8,982	99.30
Amsterdam V	Invalid/blank votes		152	1.64	63	0.70
Amsterdam V	Total votes		9,243	100	9,045	100
Amsterdam V	Registered voters/turnout		12,892	71.70	12,891	70.17
Amsterdam VI	H. Verkouteren	Christian Historical Union	2,077	48.92	2,188	47.94
Amsterdam VI	W. H. de Beaufort	League of Free Liberals	1,767	41.62	2,376	52.06
Amsterdam VI	A. H. Gerhard	Social Democratic Workers' Party	402	9.47		
Amsterdam VI	Valid votes		4,246	99.09	4,564	99.28
Amsterdam VI	Invalid/blank votes		39	0.91	33	0.72
Amsterdam VI	Total votes		4,285	100	4,597	100
Amsterdam VI	Registered voters/turnout		5,857	73.16	5,857	78.49
Amsterdam VII	G. A. A. Middelberg	Anti-Revolutionary Party	1,953	51.84		
Amsterdam VII	C. F. J. Blooker	League of Free Liberals	1,271	33.74		
Amsterdam VII	W. H. Vliegen	Social Democratic Workers' Party	322	8.55		
Amsterdam VII	J. D. Veegens	Free-thinking Democratic League	221	5.87		
Amsterdam VII	Valid votes		3,767	98.77		
Amsterdam VII	Invalid/blank votes		47	1.23		
Amsterdam VII	Total votes		3,814	100		
Amsterdam VII	Registered voters/turnout		4,879	78.17		
Amsterdam VIII	W. de Vlugt	Independent	1,790	52.51		
Amsterdam VIII	P. Nolting	Free-thinking Democratic League	1,231	36.11		
Amsterdam VIII	J. E. W. Duijs	Social Democratic Workers' Party	388	11.38		
Amsterdam VIII	Valid votes		3,409	97.12		
Amsterdam VIII	Invalid/blank votes		101	2.88		
Amsterdam VIII	Total votes		3,510	100		
Amsterdam VIII	Registered voters/turnout		4,655	75.40		
Amsterdam IX	T. de Vries	Anti-Revolutionary Party	4,516	34.95	6,250	45.32
Amsterdam IX	W. H. Vliegen	Social Democratic Workers' Party	4,421	34.22	7,542	54.68
Amsterdam IX	C. T. van Deventer	Free-thinking Democratic League	3,792	29.35		
Amsterdam IX	L. L. H. de Visser	Social Democratic Party	191	1.48		
Amsterdam IX	Valid votes		12,920	97.89	13,792	99.20
Amsterdam IX	Invalid/blank votes		279	2.11	111	0.80
Amsterdam IX	Total votes		13,199	100	13,903	100
Amsterdam IX	Registered voters/turnout		18,434	71.60	18,434	75.42
Apeldoorn	W. K. F. P. graaf van Bylandt	Christian Historical Union	4,397	61.49		
Apeldoorn	J. Esmeijer	Free-thinking Democratic League	2,458	34.37		
Apeldoorn	J. A. H. van den Brink	Social Democratic Workers' Party	296	4.14		
Apeldoorn	Valid votes		7,151	99.00		
Apeldoorn	Invalid/blank votes		72	1.00		
Apeldoorn	Total votes		7,223	100		
Apeldoorn	Registered voters/turnout		9,745	74.12		
Appingedam	A. Zijlstra	Anti-Revolutionary Party	2,816	39.86	3,066	44.77
Appingedam	J. H. A. Schaper	Social Democratic Workers' Party	2,705	38.29	3,782	55.23
Appingedam	H. Groenewout	Free-thinking Democratic League	1,543	21.84		
Appingedam	Valid votes		7,064	99.30	6,848	99.45
Appingedam	Invalid/blank votes		50	0.70	38	0.55
Appingedam	Total votes		7,114	100	6,886	100
Appingedam	Registered voters/turnout		8,531	83.39	8,531	80.72
Arnhem	H. C. Hogerzeil	Anti-Revolutionary Party	2,917	45.23	3,183	46.66
Arnhem	K. Eland	Liberal Union	2,481	38.47	3,638	53.34
Arnhem	L. M. Hermans	Social Democratic Workers' Party	1,051	16.30		
Arnhem	Valid votes		6,449	99.08	6,821	99.30
Arnhem	Invalid/blank votes		60	0.92	48	0.70
Arnhem	Total votes		6,509	100	6,869	100
Arnhem	Registered voters/turnout		8,069	80.67	8,069	85.13
Assen	M. W. F. Treub	Free-thinking Democratic League	1,892	43.19	3,343	69.41
Assen	L. A. S. J. de Milly van Heiden Reinestein	League of Free Liberals	1,007	22.99	1,473	30.59
Assen	H. Bos Kz.	Anti-Revolutionary Party	957	21.84		
Assen	A. van der Heide	Social Democratic Workers' Party	525	11.98		
Assen	Valid votes		4,381	98.96	4,816	99.42
Assen	Invalid/blank votes		46	1.04	28	0.58
Assen	Total votes		4,427	100	4,844	100
Assen	Registered voters/turnout		7,772	56.96	7,772	62.33
Bergen op Zoom	L. D. J. L. de Ram	General League	3,124	59.37		
Bergen op Zoom	A. L. G. H. M. Coenen	General League	1,412	26.83		
Bergen op Zoom	J. A. H. van den Brink	Social Democratic Workers' Party	433	8.23		
Bergen op Zoom	G. Nijpels	Free-thinking Democratic League	293	5.57		
Bergen op Zoom	Valid votes		5,262	97.44		
Bergen op Zoom	Invalid/blank votes		138	2.56		
Bergen op Zoom	Total votes		5,400	100		
Bergen op Zoom	Registered voters/turnout		7,881	68.52		
Beverwijk	W. C. J. Passtoors	General League	6,228	55.53		
Beverwijk	A. Schucking Kool	Free-thinking Democratic League	2,744	24.47		
Beverwijk	J. H. W. Q. ter Spill	League of Free Liberals	1,443	12.87		
Beverwijk	J. van Leeuwen	Social Democratic Workers' Party	800	7.13		
Beverwijk	Valid votes		11,215	98.67		
Beverwijk	Invalid/blank votes		151	1.33		
Beverwijk	Total votes		11,366	100		
Beverwijk	Registered voters/turnout		13,306	85.42		
Bodegraven	J. W. H. M. van Idsinga	Christian Historical Union	4,772	69.96		
Bodegraven	J. Kraus	Liberal Union	1,695	24.85		
Bodegraven	H. Spiekman	Social Democratic Workers' Party	354	5.19		
Bodegraven	Valid votes		6,821	99.00		
Bodegraven	Invalid/blank votes		69	1.00		
Bodegraven	Total votes		6,890	100		
Bodegraven	Registered voters/turnout		8,888	77.52		
Breda	W. H. Bogaardt	General League	4,281	76.38		
Breda	J. A. H. van den Brink	Social Democratic Workers' Party	615	10.97		
Breda	P. Tideman	League of Free Liberals	454	8.10		
Breda	H. Snijders	Free-thinking Democratic League	151	2.69		
Breda	J. A. Oomen	General League	104	1.86		
Breda	Valid votes		5,605	98.54		
Breda	Invalid/blank votes		83	1.46		
Breda	Total votes		5,688	100		
Breda	Registered voters/turnout		7,653	74.32		
Breukelen	J. H. de Waal Malefijt	Anti-Revolutionary Party	Unopposed			
Brielle	A. Roodhuyzen	Liberal Union	3,053	49.47	3,622	55.31
Brielle	H. C. Vegtel	Anti-Revolutionary Party	2,632	42.65	2,927	44.69
Brielle	N. van Hinte	Social Democratic Workers' Party	486	7.88		
Brielle	Valid votes		6,171	98.39	6,549	99.47
Brielle	Invalid/blank votes		101	1.61	35	0.53
Brielle	Total votes		6,272	100	6,584	100
Brielle	Registered voters/turnout		7,687	81.59	7,687	85.65
Delft	H. A. van de Velde	Anti-Revolutionary Party	3,828	64.38		
Delft	H. J. Romeijn	Liberal Union	1,357	22.82		
Delft	K. ter Laan	Social Democratic Workers' Party	761	12.80		
Delft	Valid votes		5,946	98.72		
Delft	Invalid/blank votes		77	1.28		
Delft	Total votes		6,023	100		
Delft	Registered voters/turnout		7,438	80.98		
Den Bosch	A. F. O. van Sasse van Ysselt	General League	Unopposed			
Den Haag I	J. Krap	Anti-Revolutionary Party	3,035	42.02	3,919	47.30
Den Haag I	K. ter Laan	Social Democratic Workers' Party	2,199	30.45	4,367	52.70
Den Haag I	J. Limburg	Free-thinking Democratic League	1,988	27.53		
Den Haag I	Valid votes		7,222	98.31	8,286	98.88
Den Haag I	Invalid/blank votes		124	1.69	94	1.12
Den Haag I	Total votes		7,346	100	8,380	100
Den Haag I	Registered voters/turnout		10,950	67.09	10,950	76.53
Den Haag II	J. R. Snoeck Henkemans	Christian Historical Union	3,905	48.23	4,333	47.87
Den Haag II	W. Dolk	Liberal Union	3,188	39.38	4,719	52.13
Den Haag II	L. Hoejenbos	Social Democratic Workers' Party	1,003	12.39		
Den Haag II	Valid votes		8,096	98.46	9,052	99.37
Den Haag II	Invalid/blank votes		127	1.54	57	0.63
Den Haag II	Total votes		8,223	100	9,109	100
Den Haag II	Registered voters/turnout		11,494	71.54	11,494	79.25
Den Haag III	J. C. Jansen	Liberal Union	4,507	59.15		
Den Haag III	H. J. de Groot	Anti-Revolutionary Party	2,716	35.64		
Den Haag III	J. Bleeker	Social Democratic Workers' Party	397	5.21		
Den Haag III	Valid votes		7,620	98.67		
Den Haag III	Invalid/blank votes		103	1.33		
Den Haag III	Total votes		7,723	100		
Den Haag III	Registered voters/turnout		12,084	63.91		
Den Helder	T. H. de Meester	Liberal Union	3,128	45.77	3,891	54.25
Den Helder	A. P. Staalman	Christian Democratic Party	2,950	43.17	3,282	45.75
Den Helder	C. Thomassen	Social Democratic Workers' Party	659	9.64		
Den Helder	F. Fokkens	Christian Historical Union	97	1.42		
Den Helder	Valid votes		6,834	99.17	7,173	99.35
Den Helder	Invalid/blank votes		57	0.83	47	0.65
Den Helder	Total votes		6,891	100	7,220	100
Den Helder	Registered voters/turnout		8,402	82.02	8,402	85.93
Deventer	H. P. Marchant	Free-thinking Democratic League	2,999	50.83		
Deventer	P. J. M. Aalberse	General League	1,806	30.61		
Deventer	H. Smissaert	League of Free Liberals	883	14.97		
Deventer	N. van Hinte	Social Democratic Workers' Party	212	3.59		
Deventer	Valid votes		5,900	98.42		
Deventer	Invalid/blank votes		95	1.58		
Deventer	Total votes		5,995	100		
Deventer	Registered voters/turnout		7,740	77.45		
Doetinchem	P. van Vliet	Anti-Revolutionary Party	6,181	61.13		
Doetinchem	T. H. de Meester	Liberal Union	3,093	30.59		
Doetinchem	L. M. Hermans	Social Democratic Workers' Party	838	8.29		
Doetinchem	Valid votes		10,112	99.23		
Doetinchem	Invalid/blank votes		78	0.77		
Doetinchem	Total votes		10,190	100		
Doetinchem	Registered voters/turnout		11,594	87.89		
Dokkum	R. van Veen	Christian Historical Union	3,676	56.90		
Dokkum	K. de Vries Szn.	Free-thinking Democratic League	2,265	35.06		
Dokkum	A. van der Heide	Social Democratic Workers' Party	520	8.05		
Dokkum	Valid votes		6,461	99.05		
Dokkum	Invalid/blank votes		62	0.95		
Dokkum	Total votes		6,523	100		
Dokkum	Registered voters/turnout		7,597	85.86		
Dordrecht	A. Kuyper	Anti-Revolutionary Party	3,322	44.85	3,437	45.33
Dordrecht	P. J. de Kanter	Liberal Union	2,641	35.66	4,146	54.67
Dordrecht	J. H. F. van Zadelhoff	Social Democratic Workers' Party	827	11.17		
Dordrecht	J. van Drooge	Free-thinking Democratic League	617	8.33		
Dordrecht	Valid votes		7,407	98.39	7,583	98.85
Dordrecht	Invalid/blank votes		121	1.61	88	1.15
Dordrecht	Total votes		7,528	100	7,671	100
Dordrecht	Registered voters/turnout		8,846	85.10	8,846	86.72
Druten	T. J. A. Duijnstee	General League	3,404	91.68		
Druten	Z. D. J. W. Gulden	Social Democratic Workers' Party	309	8.32		
Druten	Valid votes		3,713	97.25		
Druten	Invalid/blank votes		105	2.75		
Druten	Total votes		3,818	100		
Druten	Registered voters/turnout		6,343	60.19		
Ede	G. J. A. Schimmelpenninck	Christian Historical Union	2,749	47.15	4,134	61.58
Ede	J. W. Rudolph	Anti-Revolutionary Party	2,522	43.26	2,579	38.42
Ede	J. C. J. B. A. de Josselin de Jong	Liberal Union	405	6.95		
Ede	S. Lindeman	Social Democratic Workers' Party	154	2.64		
Ede	Valid votes		5,830	97.93	6,713	99.58
Ede	Invalid/blank votes		123	2.07	28	0.42
Ede	Total votes		5,953	100	6,741	100
Ede	Registered voters/turnout		7,688	77.43	7,688	87.68
Eindhoven	V. A. M. van den Heuvel	General League	4,759	90.30		
Eindhoven	J. Jansen	Social Democratic Workers' Party	511	9.70		
Eindhoven	Valid votes		5,270	98.97		
Eindhoven	Invalid/blank votes		55	1.03		
Eindhoven	Total votes		5,325	100		
Eindhoven	Registered voters/turnout		7,548	70.55		
Elst	A. I. M. J. baron van Wijnbergen	General League	4,367	88.80		
Elst	S. Lindeman	Social Democratic Workers' Party	551	11.20		
Elst	Valid votes		4,918	97.39		
Elst	Invalid/blank votes		132	2.61		
Elst	Total votes		5,050	100		
Elst	Registered voters/turnout		8,246	61.24		
Emmen	P. H. Roessingh	Liberal Union	4,116	63.34		
Emmen	P. Wielinga	Anti-Revolutionary Party	1,990	30.62		
Emmen	A. van der Heide	Social Democratic Workers' Party	392	6.03		
Emmen	Valid votes		6,498	98.45		
Emmen	Invalid/blank votes		102	1.55		
Emmen	Total votes		6,600	100		
Emmen	Registered voters/turnout		8,809	74.92		
Enkhuizen	N. Oosterbaan	Anti-Revolutionary Party	5,074	51.11		
Enkhuizen	H. Goeman Borgesius	Liberal Union	4,697	47.31		
Enkhuizen	J. G. van Kuykhof	Social Democratic Workers' Party	157	1.58		
Enkhuizen	Valid votes		9,928	99.59		
Enkhuizen	Invalid/blank votes		41	0.41		
Enkhuizen	Total votes		9,969	100		
Enkhuizen	Registered voters/turnout		10,243	97.33		
Enschede	G. Elhorst	Anti-Revolutionary Party	7,163	50.88		
Enschede	H. H. van Kol	Social Democratic Workers' Party	4,882	34.68		
Enschede	C. K. Elout	Liberal Union	2,033	14.44		
Enschede	Valid votes		14,078	98.81		
Enschede	Invalid/blank votes		170	1.19		
Enschede	Total votes		14,248	100		
Enschede	Registered voters/turnout		15,251	93.42		
Franeker	C. E. van Koetsveld	Christian Historical Union	2,974	43.30	3,350	47.70
Franeker	W. P. G. Helsdingen	Social Democratic Workers' Party	2,503	36.44	3,673	52.30
Franeker	A. Rauwerda	Free-thinking Democratic League	1,391	20.25		
Franeker	Valid votes		6,868	99.44	7,023	99.53
Franeker	Invalid/blank votes		39	0.56	33	0.47
Franeker	Total votes		6,907	100	7,056	100
Franeker	Registered voters/turnout		8,043	85.88	8,043	87.73
Goes	A. F. de Savornin Lohman	Christian Historical Union	3,656	62.34		
Goes	H. Goeman Borgesius	Liberal Union	1,987	33.88		
Goes	J. A. H. van den Brink	Social Democratic Workers' Party	222	3.79		
Goes	Valid votes		5,865	98.92		
Goes	Invalid/blank votes		64	1.08		
Goes	Total votes		5,929	100		
Goes	Registered voters/turnout		7,260	81.67		
Gorinchem	H. Pollema	Anti-Revolutionary Party	3,806	52.09		
Gorinchem	T. H. de Meester	Liberal Union	3,319	45.42		
Gorinchem	J. A. Bergmeyer	Social Democratic Workers' Party	182	2.49		
Gorinchem	Valid votes		7,307	98.69		
Gorinchem	Invalid/blank votes		97	1.31		
Gorinchem	Total votes		7,404	100		
Gorinchem	Registered voters/turnout		8,298	89.23		
Gouda	H. Colijn	Anti-Revolutionary Party	3,988	48.64	4,247	48.41
Gouda	W. T. C. van Doorn	Liberal Union	3,668	44.74	4,526	51.59
Gouda	J. A. Bergmeyer	Social Democratic Workers' Party	543	6.62		
Gouda	Valid votes		8,199	99.38	8,773	99.46
Gouda	Invalid/blank votes		51	0.62	48	0.54
Gouda	Total votes		8,250	100	8,821	100
Gouda	Registered voters/turnout		9,453	87.27	9,453	93.31
Grave	D. A. P. N. Koolen	General League	Unopposed			
Groningen	H. L. Drucker	Free-thinking Democratic League	3,501	51.20		
Groningen	A. F. de Savornin Lohman	Christian Historical Union	2,170	31.73		
Groningen	W. H. Vliegen	Social Democratic Workers' Party	1,167	17.07		
Groningen	Valid votes		6,838	98.19		
Groningen	Invalid/blank votes		126	1.81		
Groningen	Total votes		6,964	100		
Groningen	Registered voters/turnout		9,096	76.56		
Gulpen	C. J. M. Ruijs de Beerenbrouck	General League	4,098	58.69		
Gulpen	P. M. F. H. Brouwers	General League	2,787	39.92		
Gulpen	H. H. van Kol	Social Democratic Workers' Party	97	1.39		
Gulpen	Valid votes		6,982	97.99		
Gulpen	Invalid/blank votes		143	2.01		
Gulpen	Total votes		7,125	100		
Gulpen	Registered voters/turnout		8,561	83.23		
Haarlem	F. K. van Lennep	Christian Historical Union	3,913	48.09	4,339	50.32
Haarlem	J. H. Thiel	Free-thinking Democratic League	1,844	22.66	4,283	49.68
Haarlem	F. W. van Styrum	League of Free Liberals	1,390	17.08		
Haarlem	P. J. Troelstra	Social Democratic Workers' Party	989	12.16		
Haarlem	Valid votes		8,136	98.91	8,622	99.41
Haarlem	Invalid/blank votes		90	1.09	51	0.59
Haarlem	Total votes		8,226	100	8,673	100
Haarlem	Registered voters/turnout		9,807	83.88	9,807	88.44
Haarlemmermeer	F. H. van Wichen	General League	5,713	63.44		
Haarlemmermeer	W. P. Ruijsch	Liberal Union	2,500	27.76		
Haarlemmermeer	L. Hoejenbos	Social Democratic Workers' Party	431	4.79		
Haarlemmermeer	J. H. M. Balvers	General League	361	4.01		
Haarlemmermeer	Valid votes		9,005	98.07		
Haarlemmermeer	Invalid/blank votes		177	1.93		
Haarlemmermeer	Total votes		9,182	100		
Haarlemmermeer	Registered voters/turnout		11,215	81.87		
Harlingen	J. T. de Visser	Christian Historical Union	3,728	59.20		
Harlingen	L. W. J. K. Thomson	Liberal Union	1,784	28.33		
Harlingen	H. A. J. van Wijhe	Social Democratic Workers' Party	785	12.47		
Harlingen	Valid votes		6,297	98.89		
Harlingen	Invalid/blank votes		71	1.11		
Harlingen	Total votes		6,368	100		
Harlingen	Registered voters/turnout		7,480	85.13		
Helmond	E. R. H. Regout	General League	Unopposed			
Hilversum	S. baron van Heemstra II	Anti-Revolutionary Party	4,913	66.45		
Hilversum	N. H. van Roggen	Free-thinking Democratic League	1,657	22.41		
Hilversum	T. van der Waerden	Social Democratic Workers' Party	824	11.14		
Hilversum	Valid votes		7,394	98.13		
Hilversum	Invalid/blank votes		141	1.87		
Hilversum	Total votes		7,535	100		
Hilversum	Registered voters/turnout		11,419	65.99		
Hontenisse	P. F. Fruijtier	General League	3,362	52.49		
Hontenisse	R. R. L. de Muralt	Liberal Union	1,709	26.68		
Hontenisse	H. A. van Dalsum	General League	1,202	18.77		
Hontenisse	J. A. H. van den Brink	Social Democratic Workers' Party	132	2.06		
Hontenisse	Valid votes		6,405	98.24		
Hontenisse	Invalid/blank votes		115	1.76		
Hontenisse	Total votes		6,520	100		
Hontenisse	Registered voters/turnout		7,604	85.74		
Hoogezand	K. ter Laan	Social Democratic Workers' Party	2,091	38.44	2,553	46.93
Hoogezand	P. Rink	Liberal Union	1,766	32.46	2,887	53.07
Hoogezand	A. Zijlstra	Anti-Revolutionary Party	1,583	29.10		
Hoogezand	Valid votes		5,440	98.68	5,440	99.04
Hoogezand	Invalid/blank votes		73	1.32	53	0.96
Hoogezand	Total votes		5,513	100	5,493	100
Hoogezand	Registered voters/turnout		6,921	79.66	6,921	79.37
Hoorn	P. B. J. Ferf	Liberal Union	2,847	41.30	4,561	65.57
Hoorn	C. D. Wesseling	General League	2,043	29.63	2,395	34.43
Hoorn	J. G. van Kuykhof	Social Democratic Workers' Party	823	11.94		
Hoorn	G. Klomp	Independent	759	11.01		
Hoorn	V. H. Rutgers	Independent	422	6.12		
Hoorn	Valid votes		6,894	99.09	6,956	99.37
Hoorn	Invalid/blank votes		63	0.91	44	0.63
Hoorn	Total votes		6,957	100	7,000	100
Hoorn	Registered voters/turnout		8,145	85.41	8,145	85.94
Kampen	F. A. C. graaf van Lynden van Sandenburg	Anti-Revolutionary Party	4,027	59.24		
Kampen	N. J. Bosch	Liberal Union	2,595	38.17		
Kampen	J. E. W. Duijs	Social Democratic Workers' Party	176	2.59		
Kampen	Valid votes		6,798	98.95		
Kampen	Invalid/blank votes		72	1.05		
Kampen	Total votes		6,870	100		
Kampen	Registered voters/turnout		7,655	89.75		
Katwijk	O. J. E. baron van Wassenaer van Catwijck	Christian Historical Union	5,875	87.41		
Katwijk	C. A. Elias	Liberal Union	846	12.59		
Katwijk	Valid votes		6,721	98.81		
Katwijk	Invalid/blank votes		81	1.19		
Katwijk	Total votes		6,802	100		
Katwijk	Registered voters/turnout		8,932	76.15		
Leeuwarden	L. W. J. K. Thomson	Liberal Union	2,538	37.22	3,674	57.28
Leeuwarden	P. J. Troelstra	Social Democratic Workers' Party	2,529	37.09	2,740	42.72
Leeuwarden	G. Hofstede	Anti-Revolutionary Party	1,554	22.79		
Leeuwarden	H. D. van Ketwich Verschuur	League of Free Liberals	197	2.89		
Leeuwarden	Valid votes		6,818	99.07	6,414	99.36
Leeuwarden	Invalid/blank votes		64	0.93	41	0.64
Leeuwarden	Total votes		6,882	100	6,455	100
Leeuwarden	Registered voters/turnout		8,026	85.75	8,026	80.43
Leiden	J. T. de Visser	Christian Historical Union	2,976	53.65		
Leiden	J. H. W. Q. ter Spill	League of Free Liberals	1,080	19.47		
Leiden	A. Kaptein	Liberal Union	587	10.58		
Leiden	G. Nijpels	Free-thinking Democratic League	393	7.08		
Leiden	H. Spiekman	Social Democratic Workers' Party	388	6.99		
Leiden	L. L. H. de Visser	Social Democratic Party	123	2.22		
Leiden	Valid votes		5,547	98.70		
Leiden	Invalid/blank votes		73	1.30		
Leiden	Total votes		5,620	100		
Leiden	Registered voters/turnout		6,760	83.14		
Lochem	A. baron van Heeckeren van Kell	Anti-Revolutionary Party	3,189	40.11	3,551	46.72
Lochem	G. Jannink	Liberal Union	2,745	34.52	4,049	53.28
Lochem	J. Kok	Social Democratic Workers' Party	2,017	25.37		
Lochem	Valid votes		7,951	98.60	7,600	98.14
Lochem	Invalid/blank votes		113	1.40	144	1.86
Lochem	Total votes		8,064	100	7,744	100
Lochem	Registered voters/turnout		9,406	85.73	9,406	82.33
Loosduinen	A. Brummelkamp Jr.	Anti-Revolutionary Party	5,829	75.71		
Loosduinen	A. Ferf	Liberal Union	1,550	20.13		
Loosduinen	J. H. A. Schaper	Social Democratic Workers' Party	320	4.16		
Loosduinen	Valid votes		7,699	98.18		
Loosduinen	Invalid/blank votes		143	1.82		
Loosduinen	Total votes		7,842	100		
Loosduinen	Registered voters/turnout		9,945	78.85		
Maastricht	F. I. J. Janssen	General League	4,179	67.65		
Maastricht	W. C. de Jonge	Social Democratic Workers' Party	1,178	19.07		
Maastricht	J. B. H. Klijnen	League of Free Liberals	820	13.28		
Maastricht	Valid votes		6,177	98.22		
Maastricht	Invalid/blank votes		112	1.78		
Maastricht	Total votes		6,289	100		
Maastricht	Registered voters/turnout		7,409	84.88		
Meppel	H. Smeenge	Liberal Union	3,221	55.74		
Meppel	B. Berends	Christian Historical Union	2,323	40.20		
Meppel	E. Rugge	Social Democratic Workers' Party	235	4.07		
Meppel	Valid votes		5,779	98.33		
Meppel	Invalid/blank votes		98	1.67		
Meppel	Total votes		5,877	100		
Meppel	Registered voters/turnout		7,343	80.04		
Middelburg	J. H. Blum	Anti-Revolutionary Party	4,953	56.55		
Middelburg	H. Snijders	Free-thinking Democratic League	2,467	28.17		
Middelburg	E. A. O. de Casembroot	League of Free Liberals	855	9.76		
Middelburg	G. W. Sannes	Social Democratic Workers' Party	483	5.51		
Middelburg	Valid votes		8,758	98.80		
Middelburg	Invalid/blank votes		106	1.20		
Middelburg	Total votes		8,864	100		
Middelburg	Registered voters/turnout		10,198	86.92		
Nijmegen	O. F. A. M. van Nispen tot Sevenaer	General League	3,646	81.26		
Nijmegen	F. U. Schmidt	Social Democratic Workers' Party	841	18.74		
Nijmegen	Valid votes		4,487	97.16		
Nijmegen	Invalid/blank votes		131	2.84		
Nijmegen	Total votes		4,618	100		
Nijmegen	Registered voters/turnout		8,363	55.22		
Ommen	A. Kuyper	Anti-Revolutionary Party	4,141	57.12		
Ommen	H. W. Teesselink	Liberal Union	3,109	42.88		
Ommen	Valid votes		7,250	98.31		
Ommen	Invalid/blank votes		125	1.69		
Ommen	Total votes		7,375	100		
Ommen	Registered voters/turnout		9,026	81.71		
Oostburg	G. A. Vorsterman van Oyen	Free-thinking Democratic League	3,612	50.34		
Oostburg	P. Dieleman	Anti-Revolutionary Party	3,274	45.63		
Oostburg	G. W. Sannes	Social Democratic Workers' Party	289	4.03		
Oostburg	Valid votes		7,175	98.82		
Oostburg	Invalid/blank votes		86	1.18		
Oostburg	Total votes		7,261	100		
Oostburg	Registered voters/turnout		8,488	85.54		
Oosterhout	I. B. D. van den Berch van Heemstede	General League	4,459	89.23		
Oosterhout	P. Tideman	League of Free Liberals	321	6.42		
Oosterhout	W. F. Dekkers	Social Democratic Workers' Party	217	4.34		
Oosterhout	Valid votes		4,997	97.85		
Oosterhout	Invalid/blank votes		110	2.15		
Oosterhout	Total votes		5,107	100		
Oosterhout	Registered voters/turnout		7,460	68.46		
Rheden	J. W. J. C. M. van Nispen tot Sevenaer	General League	Unopposed			
Ridderkerk	A. P. R. C. baron van Borch van Verwolde	Anti-Revolutionary Party	4,176	55.01		
Ridderkerk	W. H. van Bilderbeek	Liberal Union	2,280	30.04		
Ridderkerk	J. Welleman	Free-thinking Democratic League	984	12.96		
Ridderkerk	J. A. Bergmeyer	Social Democratic Workers' Party	151	1.99		
Ridderkerk	Valid votes		7,591	98.74		
Ridderkerk	Invalid/blank votes		97	1.26		
Ridderkerk	Total votes		7,688	100		
Ridderkerk	Registered voters/turnout		8,370	91.85		
Roermond	F. J. Bolsius	General League	Unopposed			
Rotterdam I	D. J. de Geer	Christian Historical Union	3,341	43.83	3,856	49.65
Rotterdam I	H. Goeman Borgesius	Liberal Union	2,162	28.36	3,911	50.35
Rotterdam I	H. Spiekman	Social Democratic Workers' Party	2,120	27.81		
Rotterdam I	Valid votes		7,623	99.28	7,767	98.89
Rotterdam I	Invalid/blank votes		55	0.72	87	1.11
Rotterdam I	Total votes		7,678	100	7,854	100
Rotterdam I	Registered voters/turnout		10,111	75.94	10,111	77.68
Rotterdam II	W. B. van Staveren	Anti-Revolutionary Party	4,029	47.77	4,438	49.61
Rotterdam II	D. de Klerk	Liberal Union	3,200	37.94	4,508	50.39
Rotterdam II	P. J. Troelstra	Social Democratic Workers' Party	1,205	14.29		
Rotterdam II	Valid votes		8,434	99.11	8,946	99.11
Rotterdam II	Invalid/blank votes		76	0.89	80	0.89
Rotterdam II	Total votes		8,510	100	9,026	100
Rotterdam II	Registered voters/turnout		10,761	79.08	10,761	83.88
Rotterdam III	J. B. Verhey	Liberal Union	2,097	47.28	2,539	54.60
Rotterdam III	J. A. Loeff	General League	2,048	46.18	2,111	45.40
Rotterdam III	J. A. H. van den Brink	Social Democratic Workers' Party	290	6.54		
Rotterdam III	Valid votes		4,435	98.89	4,650	99.15
Rotterdam III	Invalid/blank votes		50	1.11	40	0.85
Rotterdam III	Total votes		4,485	100	4,690	100
Rotterdam III	Registered voters/turnout		5,628	79.69	5,628	83.33
Rotterdam IV	J. F. Heemskerk	Anti-Revolutionary Party	4,418	47.04	5,029	52.94
Rotterdam IV	A. Plate	League of Free Liberals	3,380	35.99	4,470	47.06
Rotterdam IV	H. Spiekman	Social Democratic Workers' Party	1,525	16.24		
Rotterdam IV	W. van Ravesteijn Jr.	Social Democratic Party	69	0.73		
Rotterdam IV	Valid votes		9,392	99.21	9,499	98.83
Rotterdam IV	Invalid/blank votes		75	0.79	112	1.17
Rotterdam IV	Total votes		9,467	100	9,611	100
Rotterdam IV	Registered voters/turnout		12,488	75.81	12,488	76.96
Rotterdam V	A. de Jong	Independent	2,612	49.68	3,115	53.97
Rotterdam V	E. E. van Raalte	Liberal Union	1,451	27.60	2,657	46.03
Rotterdam V	J. ter Laan	Social Democratic Workers' Party	767	14.59		
Rotterdam V	S. J. L. van Aalten Jr.	Free-thinking Democratic League	428	8.14		
Rotterdam V	Valid votes		5,258	99.30	5,772	99.19
Rotterdam V	Invalid/blank votes		37	0.70	47	0.81
Rotterdam V	Total votes		5,295	100	5,819	100
Rotterdam V	Registered voters/turnout		7,577	69.88	7,577	76.80
Schiedam	D. J. de Geer	Christian Historical Union	4,134	64.38		
Schiedam	G. Nijpels	Free-thinking Democratic League	1,149	17.89		
Schiedam	J. van Leeuwen	Social Democratic Workers' Party	1,138	17.72		
Schiedam	Valid votes		6,421	98.30		
Schiedam	Invalid/blank votes		111	1.70		
Schiedam	Total votes		6,532	100		
Schiedam	Registered voters/turnout		8,439	77.40		
Schoterland	J. A. Bergmeyer	Social Democratic Workers' Party	1,756	36.46	2,125	45.31
Schoterland	T. H. de Meester	Liberal Union	1,547	32.12	2,565	54.69
Schoterland	J. Ankerman	Christian Historical Union	1,513	31.42		
Schoterland	Valid votes		4,816	99.65	4,690	99.77
Schoterland	Invalid/blank votes		17	0.35	11	0.23
Schoterland	Total votes		4,833	100	4,701	100
Schoterland	Registered voters/turnout		6,707	72.06	6,707	70.09
Sittard	J. H. J. Beckers	General League	Unopposed			
Sliedrecht	J. van der Molen Tz.	Anti-Revolutionary Party	3,650	57.32		
Sliedrecht	F. W. J. G. Snijder van Wissenkerke	Liberal Union	2,314	36.34		
Sliedrecht	H. Spiekman	Social Democratic Workers' Party	404	6.34		
Sliedrecht	Valid votes		6,368	98.68		
Sliedrecht	Invalid/blank votes		85	1.32		
Sliedrecht	Total votes		6,453	100		
Sliedrecht	Registered voters/turnout		8,571	75.29		
Sneek	H. Colijn	Anti-Revolutionary Party	3,833	65.61		
Sneek	C. A. Zelvelder	Free-thinking Democratic League	1,070	18.32		
Sneek	H. A. J. van Wijhe	Social Democratic Workers' Party	939	16.07		
Sneek	Valid votes		5,842	99.00		
Sneek	Invalid/blank votes		59	1.00		
Sneek	Total votes		5,901	100		
Sneek	Registered voters/turnout		7,645	77.19		
Steenwijk	L. F. Duymaer van Twist	Anti-Revolutionary Party	3,826	56.47		
Steenwijk	J. van Gilse	Liberal Union	2,949	43.53		
Steenwijk	Valid votes		6,775	98.53		
Steenwijk	Invalid/blank votes		101	1.47		
Steenwijk	Total votes		6,876	100		
Steenwijk	Registered voters/turnout		7,550	91.07		
Tiel	M. Tydeman Jr.	League of Free Liberals	2,634	61.95		
Tiel	H. C. Hogerzeil	Anti-Revolutionary Party	1,305	30.69		
Tiel	J. A. Bergmeyer	Social Democratic Workers' Party	313	7.36		
Tiel	Valid votes		4,252	95.23		
Tiel	Invalid/blank votes		213	4.77		
Tiel	Total votes		4,465	100		
Tiel	Registered voters/turnout		6,267	71.25		
Tietjerksteradeel	C. van der Voort van Zijp	Anti-Revolutionary Party	4,029	58.41		
Tietjerksteradeel	H. J. Romeijn	Liberal Union	1,636	23.72		
Tietjerksteradeel	W. H. Vliegen	Social Democratic Workers' Party	1,233	17.87		
Tietjerksteradeel	Valid votes		6,898	99.27		
Tietjerksteradeel	Invalid/blank votes		51	0.73		
Tietjerksteradeel	Total votes		6,949	100		
Tietjerksteradeel	Registered voters/turnout		8,358	83.14		
Tilburg	A. H. A. Arts	General League	4,475	90.33		
Tilburg	H. Spiekman	Social Democratic Workers' Party	479	9.67		
Tilburg	Valid votes		4,954	98.35		
Tilburg	Invalid/blank votes		83	1.65		
Tilburg	Total votes		5,037	100		
Tilburg	Registered voters/turnout		7,155	70.40		
Utrecht I	H. J. H. baron van Boetzelaer	Independent	3,341	47.17	3,564	48.54
Utrecht I	A. P. C. van Karnebeek	League of Free Liberals	2,392	33.77	3,778	51.46
Utrecht I	P. J. Troelstra	Social Democratic Workers' Party	961	13.57		
Utrecht I	F. A. van Engen	Free-thinking Democratic League	389	5.49		
Utrecht I	Valid votes		7,083	98.36	7,342	98.47
Utrecht I	Invalid/blank votes		118	1.64	114	1.53
Utrecht I	Total votes		7,201	100	7,456	100
Utrecht I	Registered voters/turnout		8,578	83.95	8,578	86.92
Utrecht II	J. S. F. van Hoogstraten	Anti-Revolutionary Party	2,644	49.54	2,992	55.91
Utrecht II	J. Roëll	League of Free Liberals	1,228	23.01	2,359	44.09
Utrecht II	J. van Leeuwen	Social Democratic Workers' Party	1,202	22.52		
Utrecht II	W. H. M. Werker	Free-thinking Democratic League	263	4.93		
Utrecht II	Valid votes		5,337	98.98	5,351	98.40
Utrecht II	Invalid/blank votes		55	1.02	87	1.60
Utrecht II	Total votes		5,392	100	5,438	100
Utrecht II	Registered voters/turnout		6,662	80.94	6,662	81.63
Veendam	F. G. Petersen	Anti-Revolutionary Party	2,161	34.95	2,222	36.74
Veendam	E. A. Smidt	Free-thinking Democratic League	2,037	32.95	3,826	63.26
Veendam	G. W. Sannes	Social Democratic Workers' Party	1,893	30.62		
Veendam	F. J. W. Drion	League of Free Liberals	92	1.49		
Veendam	Valid votes		6,183	98.72	6,048	99.28
Veendam	Invalid/blank votes		80	1.28	44	0.72
Veendam	Total votes		6,263	100	6,092	100
Veendam	Registered voters/turnout		8,185	76.52	8,185	74.43
Veghel	B. R. F. van Vlijmen	General League	Unopposed			
Venlo	W. H. Nolens	General League	5,306	95.16		
Venlo	J. Oudegeest	Social Democratic Workers' Party	270	4.84		
Venlo	Valid votes		5,576	99.32		
Venlo	Invalid/blank votes		38	0.68		
Venlo	Total votes		5,614	100		
Venlo	Registered voters/turnout		7,274	77.18		
Waalwijk	J. A. Loeff	General League	Unopposed			
Weert	V. E. L. de Stuers	General League	Unopposed			
Weststellingwerf	F. W. N. Hugenholtz	Social Democratic Workers' Party	1,850	36.18	2,897	55.43
Weststellingwerf	H. C. Hogerzeil	Anti-Revolutionary Party	1,840	35.99	2,329	44.57
Weststellingwerf	L. W. J. K. Thomson	Liberal Union	1,423	27.83		
Weststellingwerf	Valid votes		5,113	98.88	5,226	98.88
Weststellingwerf	Invalid/blank votes		58	1.12	59	1.12
Weststellingwerf	Total votes		5,171	100	5,285	100
Weststellingwerf	Registered voters/turnout		6,849	75.50	6,849	77.16
Wijk bij Duurstede	N. de Ridder	Anti-Revolutionary Party	4,409	72.83		
Wijk bij Duurstede	P. Tideman	League of Free Liberals	1,403	23.17		
Wijk bij Duurstede	W. F. Dekkers	Social Democratic Workers' Party	242	4.00		
Wijk bij Duurstede	Valid votes		6,054	97.43		
Wijk bij Duurstede	Invalid/blank votes		160	2.57		
Wijk bij Duurstede	Total votes		6,214	100		
Wijk bij Duurstede	Registered voters/turnout		8,277	75.08		
Winschoten	D. Bos	Free-thinking Democratic League	2,032	48.09	3,309	72.58
Winschoten	J. F. Heemskerk	Anti-Revolutionary Party	1,174	27.79	1,250	27.42
Winschoten	H. J. Kenter	Independent	1,019	24.12		
Winschoten	Valid votes		4,225	98.23	4,559	99.07
Winschoten	Invalid/blank votes		76	1.77	43	0.93
Winschoten	Total votes		4,301	100	4,602	100
Winschoten	Registered voters/turnout		7,175	59.94	7,175	64.14
Zaandam	J. E. W. Duijs	Social Democratic Workers' Party	3,456	41.52	4,158	50.89
Zaandam	H. J. C. van Tienen	Liberal Union	2,571	30.89	4,013	49.11
Zaandam	L. F. Duymaer van Twist	Anti-Revolutionary Party	2,296	27.59		
Zaandam	Valid votes		8,323	98.93	8,171	99.11
Zaandam	Invalid/blank votes		90	1.07	73	0.89
Zaandam	Total votes		8,413	100	8,244	100
Zaandam	Registered voters/turnout		10,269	81.93	10,269	80.28
Zevenbergen	A. C. A. van Vuuren	General League	Unopposed			
Zierikzee	R. J. H. Patijn	Liberal Union	3,944	51.73		
Zierikzee	H. C. Vegtel	Anti-Revolutionary Party	3,402	44.62		
Zierikzee	F. M. Wibaut	Social Democratic Workers' Party	278	3.65		
Zierikzee	Valid votes		7,624	99.18		
Zierikzee	Invalid/blank votes		63	0.82		
Zierikzee	Total votes		7,687	100		
Zierikzee	Registered voters/turnout		8,284	92.79		
Zuidhorn	G. Hofstede	Anti-Revolutionary Party	3,617	46.51	3,603	46.45
Zuidhorn	E. M. Teenstra	Free-thinking Democratic League	3,326	42.77	4,154	53.55
Zuidhorn	W. H. Vliegen	Social Democratic Workers' Party	834	10.72		
Zuidhorn	Valid votes		7,777	98.64	7,757	99.30
Zuidhorn	Invalid/blank votes		107	1.36	55	0.70
Zuidhorn	Total votes		7,884	100	7,812	100
Zuidhorn	Registered voters/turnout		8,647	91.18	8,647	90.34
Zutphen	A. baron van Heeckeren van Kell	Anti-Revolutionary Party	3,572	47.17	3,734	47.42
Zutphen	F. Lieftinck	Liberal Union	3,402	44.92	4,140	52.58
Zutphen	F. M. Wibaut	Social Democratic Workers' Party	599	7.91		
Zutphen	Valid votes		7,573	98.77	7,874	99.33
Zutphen	Invalid/blank votes		94	1.23	53	0.67
Zutphen	Total votes		7,667	100	7,927	100
Zutphen	Registered voters/turnout		8,550	89.67	8,550	92.71
Zwolle	A. baron van Dedem	Christian Historical Union	3,794	60.58		
Zwolle	W. H. M. Werker	Free-thinking Democratic League	877	14.00		
Zwolle	S. van Houten	League of Free Liberals	840	13.41		
Zwolle	J. A. Bergmeyer	Social Democratic Workers' Party	752	12.01		
Zwolle	Valid votes		6,263	97.43		
Zwolle	Invalid/blank votes		165	2.57		
Zwolle	Total votes		6,428	100		
Zwolle	Registered voters/turnout		7,869	81.69		
