= League of Free Liberals =

Dutch classical liberal political party

League of Free Liberals Bond van Vrije Liberalen
- Chairperson: Meinard Tydeman (1906–1916); Alibert Cornelis Visser van IJzendoorn (1916-1921)
- Founded: June 23, 1906
- Dissolved: April 16, 1921
- Preceded by: Free liberals
- Succeeded by: Liberal State Party
- Ideology: Classical liberalism Night-watchman state
- Colors: Black (logo); Blue (customary)

The League of Free Liberals (Dutch: Bond van Vrije Liberalen) was a Dutch classical liberal political party and a predecessor of the Liberal State Party which is historically linked to the People's Party for Freedom and Democracy, the major Dutch liberal party. The party's name League of Free Liberals was supposed to convey that the party was not a classical political party, with party discipline and a centralised organisation but a league of independent MPs. The conservative liberals were called free liberals before they had founded a separate party.

== History ==
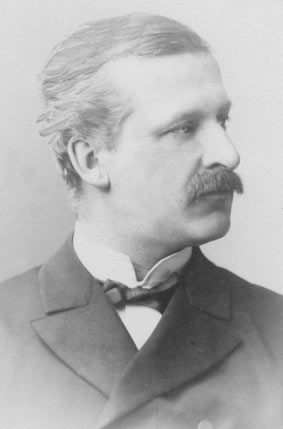
Joan Röell, Prime Minister from 1894 to 1897.

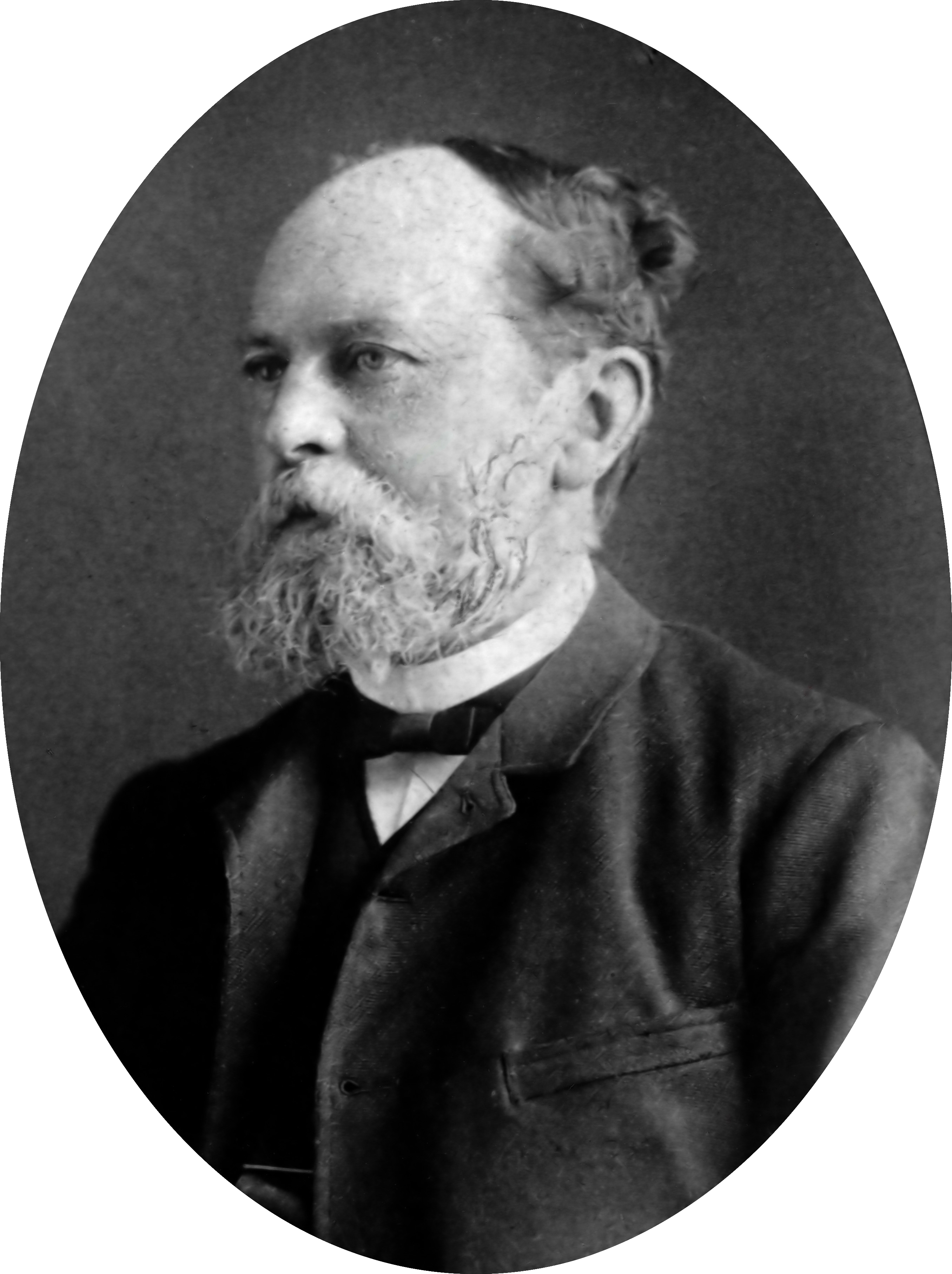
Samuel van Houten, Minister of the Interior from 1894 to 1897.

The League of Free Liberals was the first official organisation of old, free or conservative liberals, who had been elected on individual tickets since the 1870s. They held a considerable number of seats in the late 1880s and 1890s. The conservative classical liberals were opposed to the progressive politics of liberal politicians like Kappeyne van de Coppello. After the 1877 elections, the first signs of a real conservative tendency were visible. They were led by Gleichman and where therefore called Gleichmannians, as opposed to Kappeynians (who supported Kappeyne van de Coppello). In 1885 however all liberals united in the Liberal Union.

In 1894, the conflict between the progressive and conservative or classically liberal tendencies heated over the proposed relaxation of the census. A group of prominent conservative liberals left the Liberal Union. They lacked real leadership, they had no official chairman for their parliamentary party in the House of Representatives. Instead charismatic politicians gathered like-minded MPs around them. After the 1894 elections many classical and conservative liberals were represented in the cabinet, led by the liberal conservative Roëll. The conservative liberals had good relations with the Liberal Union and two political groups cooperated in many electoral districts and some prominent conservative liberals were minister in progressive liberal governments, like De Beaufort, who served as minister of Foreign Affairs in cabinet led by Van Tienhoven (1891–1894). The De Meester Cabinet also had several liberal conservative ministers.

The League of Free Liberals was founded on 23 June 1906 as a political club of these conservative liberals. They had long opposed the idea of an organised political party. But because they were losing elections against the well organised parties like the Liberal Union and the Anti-Revolutionary Party, they felt forced to.

In the 1909 elections, the League received a meagre four seats and were confined to opposition to a Christian democratic government. After the 1913 elections the League formed an alliance with the Liberal Union, proposing the implementation of universal suffrage and state pensions. The party doubled more than its seats to ten. Two Free Liberals become minister in the extra-parliamentary cabinet, led by Cort van Linden, which enacts universal suffrage.

In the 1918 elections, the party is left with three seats. It joined the Liberal Union and the minor Middle Class Party, Neutral Party and the Economic League to form the Liberal State Party, the Freedom League on 16 April 1921.

== Ideology and electorate ==
The League was a classically liberal party emphasising the freedom of the individual. It favoured a laissez faire economic system, a nightwatchman state and free trade. It was in favour of the gradual implementation of universal suffrage. The party was a staunch defender of the separation of church and state. The League was supported by bourgeoisie voters from Amsterdam, Rotterdam and Utrecht and larger provincial centres in North and South Holland.

== Election results ==
This table shows the League's results in elections to the House of Representatives.

Election year	%	Seats	+/–	Government
1894		28 / 100		in coalition
1897		13 / 100	▼15	in coalition
1901		8 / 100	▼5	in opposition
1905		9 / 100	▲1	in opposition
1909		4 / 100	▼5	in opposition
1913		10 / 100	▲6	in opposition
1917		10 / 100	0	in opposition
1918	3.8%	4 / 100	▼6	in opposition

== Leadership ==
The Free Liberals' parliamentary group had the following chairmen:

- 1906–1916: Meinard Tydeman
- 1916–1921: Alibert Cornelis Visser van IJzendoorn
