= General League of Roman Catholic Electoral Associations =

Dutch political party

The General League of Roman Catholic Electoral Associations (Dutch: Algemeene Bond van Roomsch-Katholieke Kiesverenigingen), informally called the General League (Dutch: Algemeene Bond), was a Catholic political party in the Netherlands. It existed from 1904 to 1926, when it was succeeded by the Roman Catholic State Party. It is one of the ancestors of today's Christian Democratic Appeal.

== History ==
=== Before 1904 ===
During the 19th century, Catholics were a disadvantaged minority in the Netherlands. They enjoyed considerable independence in the southern provinces North Brabant and Limburg, where they formed 90% of the population. In the north, however, Catholics were not allowed to organise religious rallies and demonstrations. Until 1848, the hierarchy of the Roman Catholic Church was forbidden in the Netherlands. A mix of Protestantism and nationalism, inspired by the struggle for independence against the Catholic Spanish, was a reason.

Until the 1880s, the most important ally of the Catholics were the liberals, who advocated freedom of religion. Catholics supported several liberal governments but were divided between two groups: those for the progressive Herman Schaepman and those for the conservative Bernardus Marie Bahlmann. The progressives favoured a corporatist economy and extension of suffrage, but the conservatives, who represented business interests, opposed both. Meanwhile, the organisation of the Catholics was concentrated on the district or province. The Brabant electoral associations were exceptionally strong.

In the late 1880s, the Catholics became disillusioned with the liberals because, although they supported the freedom of religion, they refused to finance Catholic, or otherwise religious, schools. That became an important issue that united the Catholics. In 1888 the Catholic parliamentary party switched its allegiances to the Protestant Anti-Revolutionary Party and became part of the first Coalition cabinet, led by Aeneas Mackay Jr. The new cabinet also jump started the formation of a new party in 1896. All Catholic candidates then rallied around one programme, written by Schaepman. The programme was inspired by the encyclical Rerum novarum, which advocated social Catholic politics. From 1897, Catholic MPs began to meet regularly.

=== 1904–1926 ===
Finally, on 15 October 1904, the General League was founded as a federation of district and provincial Catholic electoral associations and parliamentarians.

The 1905 general election was the first election contested by the League. It retained the same number of seats as previously held by Catholic candidates: 25 (out of 100). That number remained remarkably stable in subsequent elections. The party governed between 1908 and 1913 together with the ARP and the Protestant CHU, in the cabinet led by Theo Heemskerk. Between 1913 and 1918, the party was out of power by a liberal minority cabinet, which was preparing an important constitutional revision to solve the two most pressing political issues of the past three decades: suffrage and equal financing for religious schools. All parties were involved in the process, and in 1917, the changes were implemented.

Then, the General League grew in power. In the 1918 general election, the first held under proportional representation, the League became the largest party, and its alliance with the ARP and CHU won a considerable majority. For the first time in Dutch political history, a Catholic, Charles Ruijs de Beerenbrouck, became Prime Minister.

That responsibility put considerable pressure on the party. In 1919, Henri van Groenendael was removed from the party ranks due to his sympathy for the Limburgurgish separatist movement. In 1922 another Catholic party, the Roman Catholic People's Party, was founded by former members of the General League and was oriented towards Catholic workers. In 1923, 10 Catholic MPs caused the fall of the second Ruijs de Beerenbrouck cabinet by voting against the budget of the Ministry for the Navy. Ruijs de Beerenbrouck continued with a new cabinet. In 1925, the orthodox Protestant MP Gerrit Hendrik Kersten caused the fall of the first Colijn cabinet. Kersten had proposed every year for the Dutch representative at the Holy See to be abolished. Each year, the conservative Protestant CHU, which was in government with the General League, had supported the proposal. Now, the socialist and liberal opposition supported the proposal as well, which was unacceptable for the Catholic ministers, and their departure caused the cabinet to fall. Those events and the pressure of governing accelerated the General League's change to a tightly-organised mass party. In 1926, it formed a new party, the Roman Catholic State Party, which was the continuation of the General League with a stronger organisation.

== Name ==
The name "League" conveyed three things: its federative nature, as it was a federal league of electoral associations, its Roman Catholic ideology, and its opposition to partisan politics – it was a general league. The long name was not abbreviated in an acronym, but just as General League. Before the foundation of the Roman Catholic State Party in 1926 the party was also generally known under that name.

== Ideology and issues ==
The General League was a Catholic party, which explicitly based itself on the papal encyclical Rerum novarum. In this encyclical, Pope Leo XIII expressed the principles of Catholic social teaching. It called for stronger government intervention in the economy and workers' rights.

As a Catholic party, it advocated equal finances for religious and public schools. Furthermore, the party supported religious freedom for Catholics in the Northern provinces, such as the right to hold religious demonstrations. It wanted a separate envoy at the Holy See and a strong Catholic mission in the Dutch East Indies.

As a Catholic social party, it was a staunch proponent of a corporatist economy, where employers' organisations, unions, and the state work together for the common good. It supported the implementation of a system of social security, protection to develop national industry, and the improvement of the position of workers. It advocated householder franchise in which only heads of families could vote.

After World War I it advocated increased spending on defense.

== Representation ==
This table shows the General League's results in elections to the House of Representatives and Senate, as well as the party's political leadership: the fractievoorzitter, the chair of the parliamentary party, and the lijsttrekker, the party's top candidate in a general election; these posts are normally taken by the party's leader. It is also possible that the party leader was a cabinet member, if the General League was part of the governing coalition. The "highest ranking" minister is listed.

Year	HoR	S	Lead candidate	Parliamentary leader	Cabinet
1905	25	17	not applicable	Maximilien Kolkman	opposition
1906	25	17	no election	Maximilien Kolkman	opposition
1907	25	19	no election	Maximilien Kolkman	opposition
1908	25	19	no election	Maximilien Kolkman	opposition
1909	25	19	not applicable	Jan Loeff	Anton Nelissen
1910	25	18	no election	Wiel Nolens	Anton Nelissen
1911	25	18	no election	Wiel Nolens	Robert Regout
1912	25	18	no election	Wiel Nolens	Robert Regout
1913	25	18	not applicable	Wiel Nolens	opposition
1914	25	18	no election	Wiel Nolens	opposition
1915	25	18	no election	Wiel Nolens	opposition
1916	25	17	no election	Wiel Nolens	opposition
1917	25	17	not applicable	Wiel Nolens	opposition
1918	30	17	Wiel Nolens	Wiel Nolens	Charles Ruijs de Beerenbrouck (PM)
1919	30	17	no election	Wiel Nolens	Charles Ruijs de Beerenbrouck (PM)
1920	30	17	no election	Wiel Nolens	Charles Ruijs de Beerenbrouck (PM)
1921	30	17	no election	Wiel Nolens	Charles Ruijs de Beerenbrouck (PM)
1922	32	21	Wiel Nolens	Wiel Nolens	Charles Ruijs de Beerenbrouck (PM)
1923	32	16	no election	Wiel Nolens	Charles Ruijs de Beerenbrouck (PM)
1924	32	16	no election	Wiel Nolens	Charles Ruijs de Beerenbrouck (PM)
1925	30	16	Wiel Nolens	Wiel Nolens	Dionysius Koolen

== Electorate ==
The General League was supported by Catholics of all classes. In North Brabant and Limburg, it often got more than 90% of the vote, and was comfortably in control of the provincial and municipal councils.

== Organisation ==
=== Organisational structure ===
The party was a loose league of electoral associations, with little party discipline. The weak party organisation was dependent on the party's parliamentary party.

=== Pillarised organisations ===
The General League had close links to many other Catholic institutions such as the Roman Catholic Church, and together they formed the Catholic pillar. These organisations included a Catholic labour union, the Catholic employers' organisation, the Catholic farmers' organisation, Catholic Hospitals united in the Yellow-White Cross, and Catholic Schools.

=== Relationships to other parties ===
The General League was allied to the Protestant Anti-Revolutionary Party and Christian Historical Union, in alliance called the Coalition. Their shared issue was the equal financing for religious schools by the government. The relationship with the ARP, which also supported the extension of suffrage and recognised the Catholic religion, was considerably better than with the CHU, which opposed the extension of suffrage and sought to minimise the rights of Catholics.

== International comparison ==
As a Catholic party in a predominantly Protestant country, it is similar to the German Centre Party or the Swiss Conservative People's Party. All three were committed to the emancipation of Catholics from their disadvantaged position.

== See also ==
- List of General League of Roman Catholic Electoral Associations candidates in the 1922 Dutch general election
