= Liberal Union (Netherlands) =

Liberal Union Liberale Unie
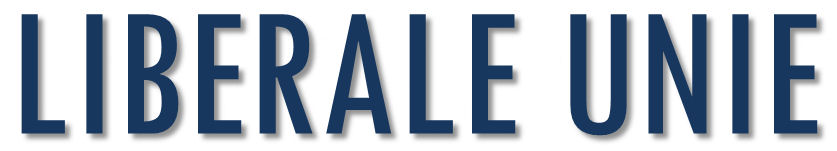
- Founded: 4 March 1885
- Dissolved: 16 April 1921
- Merged into: Liberal State Party
- Ideology: Conservative liberalism

The Liberal Union (Dutch: Liberale Unie) was a conservative liberal and progressive liberal political party in the Netherlands. A major party in its time, the Liberals were one of the historic predecessors of the Liberal State Party, and therefore of the People's Party for Freedom and Democracy.

== History ==
After the Constitutional Reform of 1848, liberals became the dominant political force in the Netherlands. They were organised in loose political clubs and caucuses. Liberals were divided between progressive, centrist and conservative liberals, but because of the lack of organised political parties, these divisions were not very strong. In 1879 the division became explicit when a separate parliamentary party was formed by supporters of Jan Kappeyne van de Coppello. With the rise of both Catholic and Protestant parties, the liberals were forced to organise themselves better.

In 1885, all the liberal political clubs and caucuses were united in the Liberal Union. The Union was factionalised: it had a progressive, a conservative and a centrist faction.

In the 1888 general election, the liberals were forced into opposition by a majority of the confessional political parties. In the 1891 general election, however, the confessional parties lost their majority and a liberal cabinet led by Gijsbert van Tienhoven was formed. The cabinet's most important proposal is the relaxation of the census, proposed by minister of home affairs Tak van Poortvliet; the law would grant the right to vote to all men able to read and write. All political parties were divided on the subject and with a very narrow majority the proposal was rejected. In reaction to this the cabinet resigned and a new election was held. In this election the division between pro-suffrage "Takkians" and anti-suffrage "anti-Takkians" grew. The Liberal Union was also split on the subject. A group of conservative liberals left the party, remaining a loose political club until the foundation of the League of Free Liberals in 1906.

The anti-Takkians won the 1894 general election, and the Liberal Union was confined to opposition. After the 1897 general election, the liberals regained their majority and a cabinet led Nicolaas Gerard Pierson enacted a series of social laws, including compulsory education for all children between the ages of six and twelve.

In 1901, the progressive liberals in the party founded the Free-thinking Democratic League together with the Radicale Bond. This caused the liberals to lose their majority in the subsequent election. In the 1905 general election, however, a cabinet was formed by the two liberal parties, led by Theodoor Herman de Meester. In the 1909 general election, they lost their majority to the confessional parties again. The 1913 general election resulted in no clear majority; the Social Democratic Workers' Party was asked to join the liberals in a coalition government, but they refused. An extra-parliamentary cabinet was formed by Pieter Cort van der Linden, formed by liberals from all three liberal parties. This cabinet presided over the introduction of the 1917 Unemployment Act, which regulated the involvement of government in social security, with the government giving subsidies “for the voluntary unemployment insurance schemes of the trade unions and for unemployment benefit arrangements made by employers. In exchange for subsidizing the unemployment insurance system, the government insisted on defining the eligibility criteria for unemployment benefit payments (InfoNU, 2011).” The cabinet also enacted universal suffrage and ended the school struggle.

After the disastrous 1918 general election, the liberals lost almost half of their seats; they fell from thirty-seven to twenty seats. In 1921 the Liberals merged with the League of Free Liberals, as well as the Economic League, Middle Class Party and the Neutral Party, to form the Liberal State Party, the mainstream liberal party.

== Ideology and issues ==
The Union started out as a moderately progressive liberal party, committed to the freedom of the individual. Gradually it became more conservative. It was in favour of a small government, which nonetheless got its income from progressive taxation and would enact social legislation. The party was fiscally conservative. Furthermore, the party was in favour of the universal suffrage and proportional representation.

== Representation ==
=== Leadership ===
Chairman of the parliamentary party

1905–1913 Hendrik Goeman Borgesius
1913–1917 Theo de Meester
1917–1918 Eduard Ellis van Raalte
1918–1921 Pieter Rink

Prime Ministers

1891–1894 Van Tienhoven
1897–1901 Pierson
1905–1908 De Meester
1913–1918 Cort van der Linden

=== Members of the House of Representatives ===
Development of the number of seats in the Lower House, of the 100 available. Before 1918 elected in single member districts, after that by proportional representation:

1918 - 6
1913 - 22
1909 - 20
1905 - 25
1901 - 18
1897 - 35
1894 - 57 (this includes conservative liberals)
1891 - 53 (this includes conservative liberals)
1888 - 46

== Electorate ==
Liberal received support from atheist and Latitudinarian Protestant voters from the higher classes: businessmen, civil servants, wealthy farmers and voters from the liberal professions (lawyers, doctors, etc.) The party performed particularly well in the major trading cities Amsterdam and Rotterdam, in provincial centres like Arnhem, Zutphen and Leeuwarden, in the rich municipalities around Hilversum and The Hague and in northern rural provinces, like Groningen and Drenthe.

=== Relationships to other parties ===
The Liberal Union formed a loose alliance with the League of Free Liberals and the Free-thinking Liberal League. The parties cooperated in several cabinets. The liberal legislation to extend suffrage and to better the position of workers was often supported by the Social Democratic Workers' Party.

== See also ==
- Liberalism
- List of liberal theorists
- Liberalism by country
- Liberal democracy
- Liberalism in the Netherlands
