= List of candidates in the 1922 Dutch general election =

Prior to the 1922 Dutch general election, contesting parties put forward party lists.

== Anti-Revolutionary Party ==
=== Utrecht, Leiden ===
Candidate list for the Anti-Revolutionary Party
Position	Candidate	Votes	Result
1	Victor Henri Rutgers	54,254	Elected
2	Frederik Hendrik de Monté VerLoren	359	Elected
3	Jan van der Molen	101	Elected
4	Jan Schouten	378	Elected
5	Chris van den Heuvel	346	Replacement
6	Willem Warnaar	97	Replacement
7	M. Jongebreur	1,131	
8	Simon de Vries Czn.	36	
9	H. van Andel	55	
10	L. Adriaanse	70	
Total		56,827	

=== Amsterdam, Den Helder ===
Candidate list for the Anti-Revolutionary Party
Position	Candidate	Votes	Result
1	Chris Smeenk	29,913	Elected
2	Victor Henri Rutgers	331	
3	F.V. Valstar	473	
4	Chris van den Heuvel	223	
5	D. L. Harms	96	
6	P. Bergmeijer	48	
7	Gerrit Baas Kzn.	236	
8	P. E. Briat	17	
9	J. Porte	36	
10	Jan Schouten	78	
Total		31,451	

=== Dordrecht, Middelburg, Tilburg ===
Candidate list for the Anti-Revolutionary Party
Position	Candidate	Votes	Result
1	Jacob Adriaan de Wilde	77,245	Elected
2	Coenraad van der Voort van Zijp	303	Elected
3	Arie Colijn	350	Elected
4	Jan van der Molen	53	
5	J.F. Heemskerk	166	
6	Gerardus van Baren	93	
7	Chris van den Heuvel	135	
8	J.A.J. Jansen Manenschijn	57	
9	Jan Schouten	148	
10	C. Warnaer	791	
Total		79,341	

=== Leeuwarden, Groningen, Assen ===
Position	Candidate	Votes	Result
1	Hendrikus Colijn	88,764	Elected
2	Jan Gerrit Scheurer	177	Elected
3	Albertus Zijlstra	104	Elected
4	H.A. Leenstra	430	
5	Lodewijk Duymaer van Twist	153	
6	R. Koppe	51	
7	Gerrit Baas Kzn.	91	
8	S. Dijstra	36	
9	H.A. Verra	32	
10	J. Middelveld	216	
Total		90,054	

=== 's-Hertogenbosch, Arnhem, Nijmegen, Zwolle, Maastricht ===
Position	Candidate	Votes	Result
1	Egbertus Johannes Beumer	65,082	Elected
2	Lodewijk Duymaer van Twist	1,993	Elected
3	Hugo Visscher	8,543	Elected
4	Jan van der Molen	339	
5	G. Hofstede	637	
6	C. Roeterdink	3,134	
7	Simon de Vries Czn.	47	
8	J. Hollander	89	
9	Chris van den Heuvel	105	
10	Jan Schouten	183	
Total		80,152	

== Christian Historical Union ==
=== First list ===
First candidate list for the Christian Historical Union
Position	Candidate	Votes	Result
1	Jan Schokking	280,815	Elected
2	Dirk Jan de Geer	2,263	Elected
3	Johannes Theodoor de Visser	2,622	Elected
4	Reinhardt Snoeck Henkemans	1,255	Elected
5	Jan Weitkamp	11,334	Elected
6	Bartholomeus Johannes Gerretson	964	Elected
7	Jouke Bakker	1,023	Elected
8	Frida Katz	1,953	Elected
9	Jan Krijger	205	Elected
10	Hendrik Tilanus	421	Elected

=== Second list ===
Second candidate list for the Christian Historical Union
Position	Candidate	Votes	Result
1	Carel Wessel Theodorus van Boetzelaer van Dubbeldam	9,135	Elected
2	Jan Willem Hendrik Rutgers van Rozenburg	946	Replacement
3	Hermanus Johannes Lovink	887	Replacement
4	D.E. van Lennep	1,469	
5	Hendrik van Boeijen	1,091	
6	Kr. Timmers	239	
7	W. Roëll	303	
8	J. Knoppers	331	
9	P.J. Nahuisen	174	
10	Gerrit Johan Anne Schimmelpenninck	1,240	

== Democratic Party ==
First candidate list for the Democratic Party
Position	Candidate	Votes	Result
1	Jan Ernst Heeres	6,164	
2	B. Holtrop	640	
3	Johannes Hendrik Carpentier Alting	578	
4	Gijsbertus Koolemans Beijnen	606	
5	Mies Wiener	204	
6	Romke de Waard	245	
7	K. Breebaart	307	
8	Th.B.V. Dill	73	
9	H.F. Tillema	116	
10	C.P. van Wijngaarden	276	

== General League of Roman Catholic Electoral Associations ==
Photos of the elected Catholic candidates in the Katholieke Illustratie.
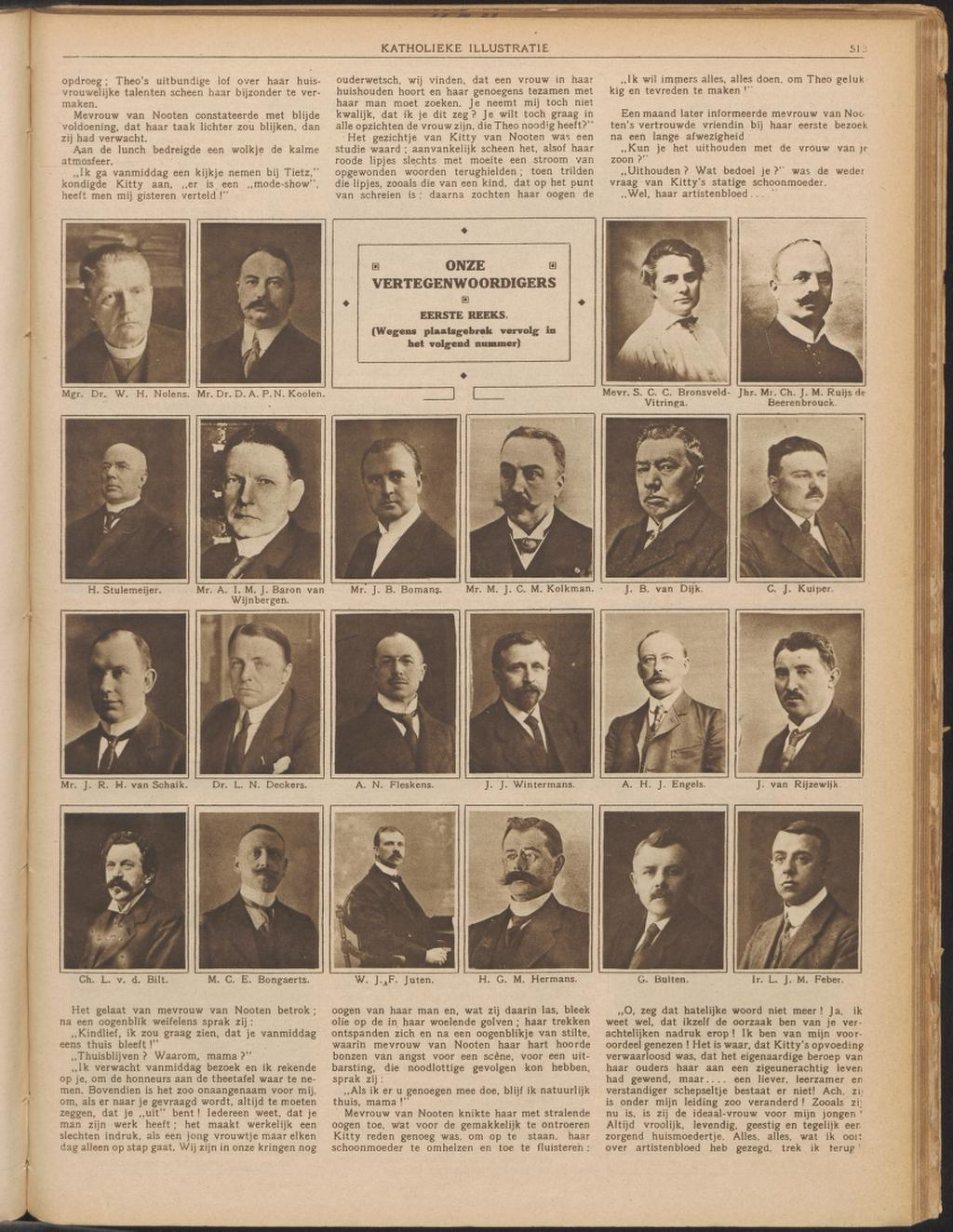
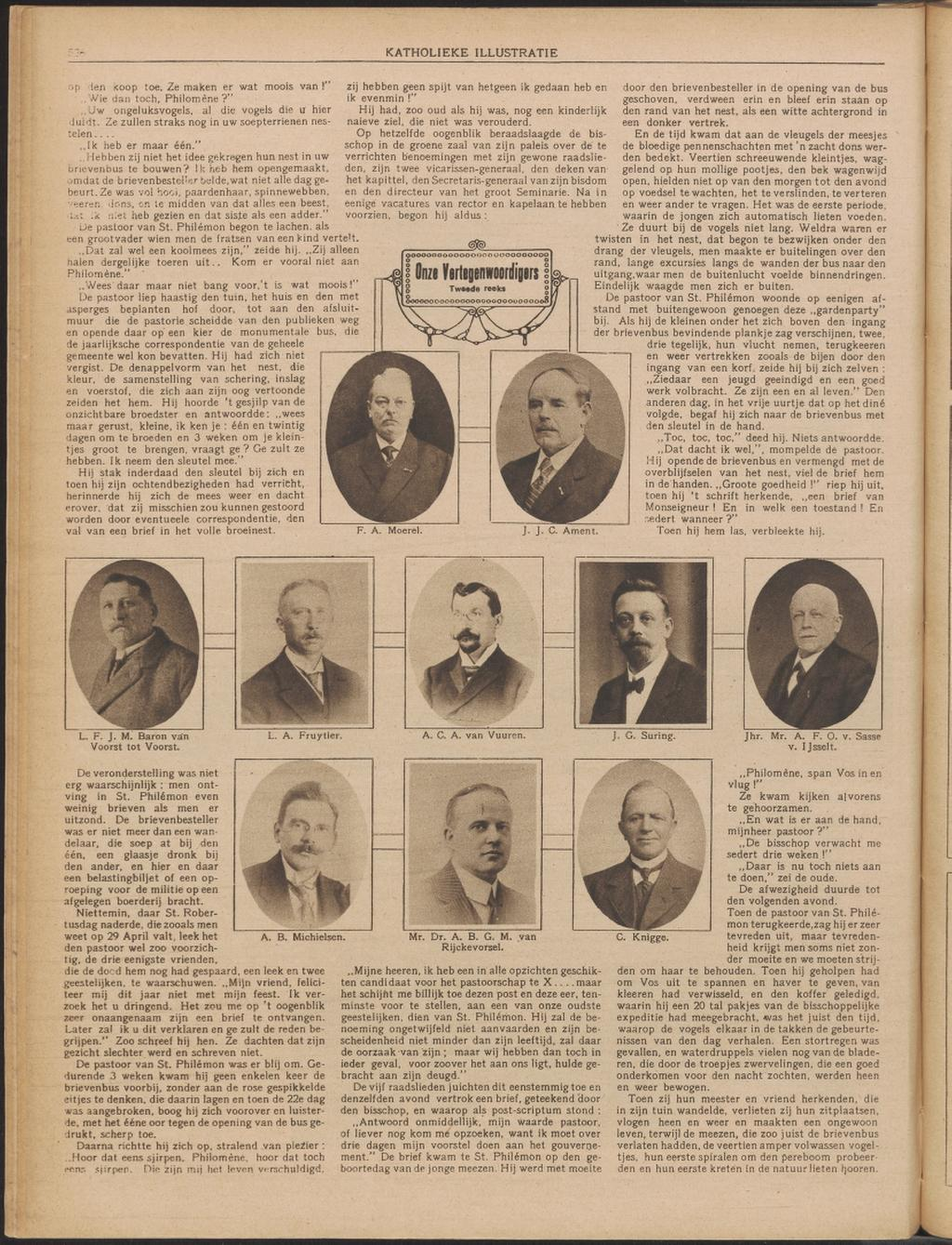

Candidates for General League of Roman Catholic Electoral Associations
Candidate	Votes	Result	Position												
Candidate	Votes	Result	's Hertogenbosch	Tilburg	Arnhem, Nijmegen, Utrecht	Rotterdam	's Gravenhage	Leiden	Dordrecht	Amsterdam	Den Helder, Haarlem	Middelburg	Leeuwarden, Groningen, Assen	Zwolle	Maastricht
Piet Aalberse Sr.	690	Elected					2							3	
G. Adriaanssens	523											4			
Joannes Ament	473	Elected													5
A. Arts	21													5	
L.A.M. van Basten Batenburg	163				10										
J.J. Belien	278		9												
Jan van Best	3,326		8						3				4		
Charles Ludovicus van de Bilt	395	Elected									2				
G.H.P. Bloemen	220													6	
Jan Bomans	76,671	Elected									1				
Max Charles Emile Bongaerts	551	Elected													3
J.H. Borghols	416			9			5	5	2						
Charlotte Bronsveld-Vitringa	830	Elected			9			3	4	2	4				
Wilhelmina Brouns-Van Besouw	796		10						7				3		
Gerhardus Bulten	249	Elected			4										
P.L.H. Cremers	2,572														9
Laurent Deckers	341	Elected	3												
Johannes Baptiste van Dijk	45,691	Elected								1					
Louis Feber	432	Elected		3					6						
Albertus Nicolaas Fleskens	545	Elected	2												
J.H.A.L. von Frijtag Drabbe	98									3					
Arnold Engels	48,548	Elected												1	
Leonard Albert Fruytier	18,265	Elected										1			
Piet Haazevoet	1,147				7										
P. Heilker	18										9				
Henri Hermans	1,215	Elected													4
A.C.A. Hoffman	9								5						
B.J.J. Huijbers	69					3									
F.W.M. Jansen	255		7												
Ch.M.J. Jansen	138										10				
Wilhelmus Johannes Franciscus Juten	1,778			4											
J. Käller-Wigman	68			8											
Cornelis Knigge	334				6										
Maximilien Joseph Caspar Marie Kolkman	34,049	Elected					1								
Adrianus Antonie Henri Willem König	116														8
Dionysius Koolen	39,083	Elected						1							
Rad Kortenhorst	70									6					
M. Krijgsman	1,727		6												
Cor Kropman	41									5					
Kees Kuiper	26,911	Elected							1						
G.M. Kusters	752			5											
Johan Marie Jacques Hubert Lambooij	292														10
A.J.M. Leesberg	41										6				
Toon Loerakker	170	Replacement						4			7				
Annie Meijer	245	Replacement				2	3								
Anthonius Benedictus Michielsen	80	Replacement									5				
Franciscus Anthonius Moerel	54	Elected						2							
W. Mooijman	49					4									
Jan van de Mortel	386			6											
F.L.D. Nivard	240			7											
Wiel Nolens	130,187	Elected													1
P.P.J.A. van der Putt	162		5												
Paul Reijmer	130	Elected, but declined									3				
Augustinus Bernardus Gijsbertus Maria van Rijckevorsel	104,983	Elected		1											
Jan van Rijzewijk	678	Elected		2											
L.H. van Rooyen	53									4					
Charles Ruijs de Beerenbrouck	585	Elected													2
Peter Johannes Rutten	3,122	Replacement													6
Alexander van Sasse van Ysselt	123,119	Elected	1												
Josef van Schaik	647	Elected			2										
P.H.J. Steenhoff	46				8										
Henri Stulemeijer	34,822	Elected				1									
Johannes Georgius Suring	230	Elected			3										
H.W. Takkenberg	150												2		
B. Veltman	29										8				
Johannes Antonius Veraart	124						4		8					4	
J.W. Vienings	267											3			
Louis François Joseph Maria van Voorst tot Voorst	614	Elected			5									2	
J.G.C. Vriens	31					5									
Adrianus Cornelis Antonie van Vuuren	24,090	Elected											1		
F.J.L.M. van Waesberghe	507											2			
Marius Alphonse Marie Waszink	337														7
Antonius van Wijnbergen	137,506	Elected			1										
Jef Wintermans	247	Elected	4												

== Groep Braam ==
Candidate list for the Groep Braam
Position	Candidate	Votes	Result
1	H. Braam	142	
Total		142	

== Liberal Party ==
Candidate list for the Liberal Party
Position	Candidate	Votes	Result
1	Samuel van Houten	11,778	Elected, but declined
2	Elisabeth van Dorp	2,596	Replacement
3	Christiaan Corneille Dutilh	285	
4	Rudolph Adriaan Fockema	900	
5	Arnoud Hendrik van Hardenbroek van Ammserstol	1,202	
6	Jan Olphert de Jong van Beek en Donk	370	
7	W.J. Kapteijn	99	
8	D. van Lookeren Campagne	112	
9	Jan Dionys Viruly	782	
Total		18,124	

== Kiesvereniging Aller Belang ==
Position	Candidate	Vote	Result
1	Lion van Lier	741	
Total		741	

== Lijst Arts ==
Candidate list for Lijst Arts
Position	Candidate	Votes	Result
1	Antoine Arts	15,356	
2	Pius Arts	474	
Total		15,830	

== New Catholic Party ==
=== Maastricht ===
Position	Candidate	Votes	Result
1	C.L.A. van der Weijden	1,550	
2	K.H.C. Joosten	59	
3	Julius Theodore Alting von Geusau	64	
4	J.J.H. Oor	75	
5	J.A.M.H. van Wessem	58	
6	A.F.H. Hendrickx	24	
7	C.E.A. van Havell tot Westerflier	61	
Total		1,891	

=== Other districts ===
Positio	Candidate	Votes	Result
1	Wilhelmus Johannes Bartholemeus van Liemt	5,584	
2	Isidorus Antonius Swane	3,952	
3	A.M.J.L. Kervel	606	
4	C.M. van der Pijl	294	
5	Julius Theodore Alting von Geusau	344	
6	P.N.J.M. Bolsius	256	
7	J. Barendse	143	
8	P.C.J. Cremer	124	
9	G.L. de Vries Feijens	305	
Total		11,608	

== Reformed Political Party ==
Candidate list for the Reformed Political Party
Position	Candidate	Votes	Result
1	Gerrit Hendrik Kersten	24,187	Elected
2	P. van der Meulen	1,572	
3	J. Vreugdenhill	519	
4	P.J. Lamoré	107	
5	J.T. Janse	359	
Total		26,744	

== Staatspartij voor de Volkswelvaart ==
=== Amsterdam ===
Position	Candidate	Votes	Result
1	Bernhard Herman Vos	1,045	
2	August Frederik Leopold Faubel	839	
3	Pieter Wilhelmus Scharroo	56	
4	Joseph Frijda	228	
5	Juda A. Milhado	1,214	
6	F.H. de Haan	73	
7	J.L. de Koning-van Arkel	19	
8	J.H. Rippe	46	
9	Johan Christoffel Ramaer	6	
10	Philippus Scipio de Laat de Kanter	7	
Total		3,533	

=== Other districts ===
Position	Candidate	Votes	Result
1	August Frederik Leopold Faubel	2,339	
2	Pieter Wilhelmus Scharroo	322	
3	Bernhard Herman Vos	1,210	
4	Juda A. Frijda	1,357	
5	J.H. Rippe	546	
6	Philippus Scipio de Laat de Kanter	94	
7	J.L. de Koning-van Arkel	71	
8	V.A. Scheltema de Heere-Sannes	99	
9	Johan Christoffel Ramaer	56	
10	K.K. Douw van der Krap	157	
Total		6,251	

== Source ==
- "Besluit van het Centraal Stembureau bedoeld in artikel 97 der Kieswet". Nederlandsche staatscourant. 19 July 1922 – via Delpher.
