= List of candidates in the 1925 Dutch general election =

Prior to the 1925 Dutch general election, contesting parties put forward party lists.

== Social Democratic Workers' Party ==
=== 's-Hertogenbosch, Tilburg, Middelburg and Maastricht ===
Position	Candidate	Votes	Result
1	Willem Vliegen	56,365	Elected
2	Willem Drop	116	Elected
3	Kees Woudenberg	54	
4	P.G. Gruijs	97	
5	J. Onderdijk	122	
6	H. van der Ploeg	42	
7	A.A. de Jong	92	
8	J.A. Bergmeijer	32	
9	L.J.C. Poppe	52	
10	Piet Moltmaker	216	

=== Arnhem and Nijmegen ===
Position	Candidate	Votes	Result
1	Asser Benjamin Kleerekoper	56,986	Elected
2	Hendrik Jan van Braambeek	336	Elected
3	Jan Lambertus Faber	599	
4	F. van de Walle	23	
5	C. Werkhoven	216	
6	L.M. Hermans	271	
7	C.A. Weersma	46	
8	W. van der Hoeven	22	
9	A. van Geuns	22	
10	M. Rademakers	90	

=== Rotterdam and Dordrecht ===
Position	Candidate	Votes	Result
1	Jan ter Laan	122,221	Elected
2	Suze Groeneweg	1,648	Elected
3	Jan van Zadelhoff	279	Elected
4	Johan Brautigam	217	Elected
5	J.J. de Roode	43	
6	J.A. Bergmeijer	80	
7	Kees Woudenberg	21	
8	P. de Bruin	55	
9	T.J.K. Kuiler	18	
10	L.M. Hermans	88	

=== The Hague and Leiden ===
Position	Candidate	Votes	Result
1	Kornelis ter Laan	71,714	Elected
2	Arie IJzerman	97	Elected
3	Willem Drees	172	
4	Willem Drop	22	
5	A. H. van der Hoeve	21	
6	P. Voogd	17	
7	J. Spronkers	27	
8	K. R. van Staal	147	
9	J. J. van Stralen	28	
10	W. C. C. van Eijkel	47	

=== Amsterdam ===
Position	Candidate	Votes	Result
1	Adriaan Gerhard	112,145	Elected
2	Jan van den Tempel	296	Elected
3	Roel Stenhuis	419	Elected
4	George van den Bergh	419	Elected
5	E. Boekman	130	
6	A. de Jong	169	
7	P. Lub	37	
8	A. H. Moll	32	
9	B. W. Binnendijk	165	

=== Den Helder and Haarlem ===
Position	Candidate	Votes	Result
1	Jan Duijs	71,789	Elected
2	Charles Cramer	217	Elected
3	C. Thomassen	233	
4	J. Gerritz	89	
5	F. van Meurs	40	
6	J. Westerhof	202	
7	A. de Vries	89	
8	B. W. Binnendijk	142	
9	M. H. Miedema	132	
10	G. L. Niemeijer	94	

=== Utrecht ===
Position	Candidate	Votes	Result
1	Theo van der Waerden	34,206	Elected
2	Bernard Wijkamp	160	
3	J. J. Reijnders	115	
4	R. Boomsma	58	
5	R. van Gaasbeek	40	
6	H. B. Bakhuis	94	

=== Leeuwarden ===
Position	Candidate	Votes	Result
1	Goswijn Sannes	49,631	Elected
2	Piet Hiemstra	135	Elected
3	F. S. Noordhoff	39	
4	H. de Boer	97	
5	J. J. Vorrink	18	
6	Albert van der Heide	144	Elected on a different list
7	J. Ytsma	27	
8	K. de Boer	32	
9	L. van der Wal	44	

=== Zwolle ===
Position	Candidate	Votes	Result
1	Willem Albarda	44,400	Elected
2	Wiebe van der Sluis	251	Elected
3	G. A. Leendertz	153	
4	B. H. van Ruyven	20	
5	H. J. J. Eichelsheim	18	
6	A. Teesink	34	
7	J. Bevers	96	

=== Groningen and Assen ===
Position	Candidate	Votes	Result
1	Jan Schaper	76,285	Elected
2	Agnes de Vries-Bruins	656	Elected
3	Albert van der Heide	358	Elected
4	D. Bartels	76	
5	K. de Jonge	42	
6	W. Mansholt	85	
7	H. van der Wielen	19	
8	B. H. Bredman	24	
9	J. van Dok	214	

== Christian Historical Union ==
Candidate list for the Christian Historical Union
Position	Candidate	Votes	Result
1	Jan Schokking	284,291	Elected, but declined
2	Dirk Jan de Geer	4,276	Elected, but declined
3	Reinhardt Snoeck Henkemans	973	Elected
4	Johannes Theodoor de Visser	2,074	Elected
5	Jouke Bakker	819	Elected
6	Jan Weitkamp	6,797	Elected
7	Jan Krijger	273	Elected
8	Frida Katz	1,566	Elected
9	Hendrik Tilanus	322	Elected
10	Hermanus Johannes Lovink	517	Elected
11	Carel Wessel Theodorus van Boetzelaer van Dubbeldam	905	Elected
12	Jan Willem Hendrik Rutgers van Rozenburg	295	Replacement
13	Johan Langman	363	Replacement
14	P.J. Nahuisen	153	
15	Aat van Rhijn	421	
16	Jan ter Haar jr.	588	
17	J. Knoppers	264	
18	Hendrik van Boeijen	86	
19	W.F.C. van den Broek	115	
20	Tjeerd Krol	489	

== Reformed Political Party ==
Candidate list for the Reformed Political Party
Position	Candidate	Votes	Result
1	Gerrit Hendrik Kersten	57,405	Elected
2	Pieter Zandt	3,166	Elected
3	P. van der Meulen	250	
4	E. Kuyk	179	
5	A.J. Kersten	458	
6	David Kodde	92	
7	W.A. van Os	85	
8	C.B. van Woerden	121	
9	A. Hoogendijk	689	
Total			

== Union of Actualists ==
Candidate list for the Union of Actualists
Position	Candidate	Votes	Result
1	Jan Schouten	1,849	
1	W.H.A.G. van Ittersum	295	

== Anti-Revolutionary Party ==
=== 's-Hertogenbosch, Tilburg, The Hague, Leiden, Dordrecht, Den Helder, Haarlem, Middelburg, Utrecht and Assen ===
Position	Candidate	Votes	Result
1	Hendrikus Colijn	177,457	Elected on a different list
2	Victor Rutgers	817	Elected
3	Theo Heemskerk	453	Elected
4	Jannes van Dijk	130	Elected
5	Lodewijk Duymaer van Twist	490	Elected
6	Jan Schouten	402	Elected
7	Egbertus Johannes Beumer	112	Elected on a different list
8	Hugo Visscher	1,088	Elected on a different list
9	Jacob Adriaan de Wilde	284	Elected
10	Chris Smeenk	192	Elected on a different list
11	Albertus Zijlstra	38	Elected on a different list
12	Jan Gerrit Scheurer	78	Elected on a different list
13	Hendrik Bijleveld	97	Elected on a different list
14	Chris van den Heuvel	97	
15	Hendrik Aukes Leenstra	24	
16	Theunis Heukels	45	
17	Arie Colijn	662	
18	G. Hofstede	47	
19	H. Amelink	575	
20	Hendrik Antonie Dambrink	1,715	

=== Arnhem and Nijmegen ===
Position	Candidate	Votes	Result
1	Hendrikus Colijn	36,716	Elected on a different list
2	Hugo Visscher	666	Elected
3	Egbertus Johannes Beumer	179	Elected on a different list
4	Jan Gerrit Scheurer	93	Elected on a different list
5	Theo Heemskerk	25	Elected on a different list
6	Victor Rutgers	29	Elected on a different list
7	Chris Smeenk	100	Elected on a different list
8	Jannes van Dijk	18	Elected on a different list
9	Lodewijk Duymaer van Twist	69	Elected on a different list
10	Jan Schouten	26	Elected on a different list
11	Jacob Adriaan de Wilde	14	Elected on a different list
12	Albertus Zijlstra	10	Elected on a different list
13	Hendrik Bijleveld	6	Elected on a different list
14	Chris van den Heuvel	33	
15	Hendrik Aukes Leenstra	0	
16	Theunis Heukels	0	
17	Arie Colijn	134	
18	G. Hofstede	10	
19	H. Amelink	154	
20	Hendrik Antonie Dambrink	242	

=== Rotterdam ===
Position	Candidate	Votes	Result
1	Hendrikus Colijn	25,332	Elected on a different list
2	Jan Schouten	1,388	Elected on a different list
3	Victor Rutgers	29	Elected on a different list
4	Theo Heemskerk	40	Elected on a different list
5	Jannes van Dijk	3	Elected on a different list
6	Lodewijk Duymaer van Twist	15	Elected on a different list
7	Egbertus Johannes Beumer	5	Elected
8	Hugo Visscher	40	Elected on a different list
9	Jacob Adriaan de Wilde	9	Elected on a different list
10	Chris Smeenk	17	Elected on a different list
11	Albertus Zijlstra	2	Elected on a different list
12	Jan Gerrit Scheurer	16	Elected on a different list
13	Hendrik Bijleveld	5	Elected on a different list
14	Chris van den Heuvel	5	
15	Hendrik Aukes Leenstra	2	
16	Theunis Heukels	15	
17	Arie Colijn	109	
18	G. Hofstede	1	
19	H. Amelink	24	
20	Hendrik Antonie Dambrink	339	

=== Amsterdam ===
Position	Candidate	Votes	Result
1	Hendrikus Colijn	20,958	Elected
2	Victor Rutgers	183	Elected on a different list
3	Theo Heemskerk	95	Elected on a different list
4	Jannes van Dijk	170	Elected on a different list
5	Lodewijk Duymaer van Twist	35	Elected on a different list
2	Jan Schouten	34	Elected on a different list
7	Egbertus Johannes Beumer	6	Elected on a different list
8	Hugo Visscher	58	Elected on a different list
9	Chris Smeenk	68	Elected on a different list
10	Jacob Adriaan de Wilde	9	Elected on a different list
11	Jan Gerrit Scheurer	23	Elected on a different list
12	Albertus Zijlstra	11	Elected on a different list
13	Hendrik Bijleveld	15	Elected on a different list
14	Chris van den Heuvel	5	
15	Hendrik Aukes Leenstra	2	
16	Theunis Heukels	4	
17	Arie Colijn	159	
18	G. Hofstede	23	
19	H. Amelink	27	
20	Hendrik Antonie Dambrink	43	

=== Leeuwarden ===
Position	Candidate	Votes	Result
1	Hendrikus Colijn	40,480	Elected on a different list
2	Jan Gerrit Scheurer	88	Elected
3	Victor Rutgers	12	Elected on a different list
4	Theo Heemskerk	9	Elected on a different list
5	Jannes van Dijk	3	Elected on a different list
6	Lodewijk Duymaer van Twist	37	Elected on a different list
7	Jan Schouten	13	Elected on a different list
8	Egbertus Johannes Beumer	7	Elected on a different list
9	Hugo Visscher	10	Elected on a different list
10	Jacob Adriaan de Wilde	10	Elected on different list
11	Chris Smeenk	18	Elected
12	Albertus Zijlstra	8	Elected on a different list
13	Hendrik Bijleveld	3	Elected on a different list
14	Chris van den Heuvel	0	
15	Hendrik Aukes Leenstra	65	
16	Theunis Heukels	4	
17	Arie Colijn	68	
18	G. Hofstede	2	
19	H. Amelink	16	
20	Hendrik Antonie Dambrink	314	

=== Zwolle ===
Position	Candidate	Votes	Result
1	Hendrikus Colijn	25,271	Elected on a different list
2	Lodewijk Duymaer van Twist	766	Elected on a different list
3	Egbertus Johannes Beumer	108	Elected on a different list
4	Hugo Visscher	407	Elected on a different list
5	Victor Rutgers	66	Elected on a different list
6	Theo Heemskerk	40	Elected on a different list
7	Jannes van Dijk	3	Elected on a different list
8	Jan Schouten	16	Elected on a different list
9	Jacob Adriaan de Wilde	5	Elected on a different list
10	Chris Smeenk	22	Elected on a different list
11	Albertus Zijlstra	4	Elected on a different list
12	Jan Gerrit Scheurer	11	Elected on a different list
13	Hendrik Bijleveld	2	Elected
14	Chris van den Heuvel	30	
15	Hendrik Aukes Leenstra	10	
16	Theunis Heukels	5	
17	Arie Colijn	56	
18	G. Hofstede	211	
19	H. Amelink	102	
20	Hendrik Antonie Dambrink	329	

=== Groningen ===
Position	Candidate	Votes	Result
1	Hendrikus Colijn	34,205	Elected on a different list
2	Albertus Zijlstra	325	Elected
3	Victor Rutgers	27	Elected on a different list
4	Theo Heemskerk	20	Elected on a different list
5	Jannes van Dijk	2	Elected on a different list
6	Lodewijk Duymaer van Twist	12	Elected on a different list
7	Jan Schouten	35	Elected on a different list
8	Egbertus Johannes Beumer	3	Elected on a different list
9	Hugo Visscher	18	Elected on a different list
10	Jacob Adriaan de Wilde	9	Elected on a different list
11	Chris Smeenk	42	Elected on a different list
12	Jan Gerrit Scheurer	18	Elected on a different list
13	Hendrik Bijleveld	3	Elected on a different list
14	Chris van den Heuvel	3	
15	Hendrik Aukes Leenstra	16	
16	Theunis Heukels	7	
17	Arie Colijn	96	
18	G. Hofstede	5	
19	H. Amelink	39	
20	Hendrik Antonie Dambrink	375	

=== Maastricht ===
Position	Candidate	Votes	Result
1	Hendrikus Colijn	816	Elected on a different list
2	M. van Grieken	5	
3	J. Middelveld Jr.	2	
4	Pieter Gerbrandy	3	
5	Piet Terpstra	2	
6	R. Koppe	7	
7	G. A. Diepenhorst	6	
8	C. Maris	4	
9	G. Baas	4	
10	G. H. A. Grosheide	0	
11	W. Warnaar	0	
12	J. Severijn	3	
13	C. van der Zaal		
14	K. Meima	1	
15	P. van Nes	2	
16	H. van Haeringen	2	
17	C. Roeterdink	2	
18	S. Brandsma	0	
19	D. L. Harms	8	

== Source ==
- "Besluit van het Centraal Stembureau bedoeld in artikel 97 der Kieswet". Nederlandsche staatscourant. 20 July 1925 – via Delpher.
