= Sastromoeljono =

Lawyer and mayor of Jakarta (1898–1956)

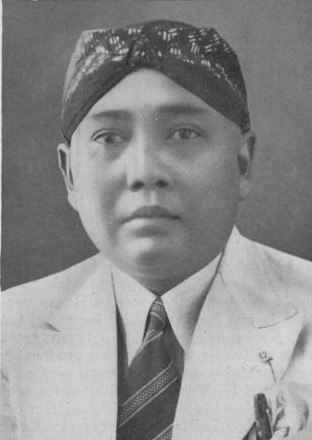

Mayor of Jakarta
- Acting
- In office 20 April 1949 – 30 March 1950
- Preceded by: Robert Thomas Praaning
- Succeeded by: Suwiryo

Personal details
- Born: 16 October 1898 Kudus, Central Java, Dutch East Indies
- Died: 28 June 1956 (aged 57) Jakarta, Indonesia
- Occupation: Lawyer

Mr. Raden Sastromoeljono (EYD: Sastromulyono; 16 October 1898 – 28 June 1956) was a lawyer and the acting mayor of Jakarta. He was a member of the Perhimpoenan Indonesia organization, and in 1945 was appointed as the member Investigating Committee for Preparatory Work for Independence.

== Early life ==
Sastromoeljono was born as the son of Raden Sastrodihardjo and Raden Ajoe Sastrodihardjo. He was born in Kudus, Central Java on 16 October 1898. He began his education at the ELS (Europese Lagere School) and finished it in 1912. After graduating from the school, he went to study in the Rechtshool (Law School), and graduated in 1918. He went to the Netherlands after graduating from the school to study in the Leiden University. He graduated with a master of law degree in 1922.

== Family ==
Sastromoeljono was married to Raden Ajoe Sastromoeljono. The marriage resulted in seven children, Raden Bambang Oetomo (21 April 1925), Raden Adjeng Sri Oetari (26 October 1926), Raden Adjeng Sri Oetarni (2 July 1928), Raden Adjeng Siti Maryah (28 April 1930), Raden Bambang Oetantyo (4 April 1934), Raden Bambang Oetarjono (15 September 1936), and Raden Roro Sri Boediarti (3 October 1941).

== Bibliography ==
- Massier, A. (2008), The Voice of the Law in Transition: Indonesian Jurists and Their Languages, 1915-2000, BRILL, ISBN 9789004253964
- Manus, MPB; Ghazali, Zulfikar; Zuhdi, Susanto; Sumardi; Kuswiah, Wiwi (1993), Tokoh-Tokoh Badan Penyelidik Usaha-Usaha Persiapan Kemerdekaan Indonesia (PDF), vol. 2, Jakarta: Ministry of Education and Culture
- Brugmans, Hajo; Japikse, Nicolaas (1938), Persoonlijkheden in het Koninkrijk der Nederlanden in woord en beeld: Nederlanders en hun werk, Amsterdam: van Holkema & Warendorf
