= Annie Meijer =

Dutch politician (1875–1954)

Johanna Maria Josepha Antonia Meijer
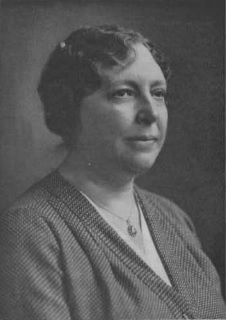

Member of House of Representatives
- In office 6 May 1924 – 8 June 1937
- Preceded by: Maximilien Joseph Caspar Marie Kolkman

Personal details
- Born: 28 July 1875 Rotterdam
- Died: 4 July 1954 (aged 78) Rotterdam
- Party: Roman Catholic State Party

Annie Meijer (28 July 1875 – 4 July 1954) was a Dutch politician of the Roman Catholic State Party (RKSP). From 6 May 1924 to 8 June 1937, she was a member of the House of Representatives. From 1923 to 1935, she was also a member of the Rotterdam municipal council and a member of the Provincial Council of South Holland.

== Biography ==
Meijer was born on 28 July 1875 in Rotterdam as the daughter of Carolus Augustus Meijer and Paulina Maria van Berckel. She attended the girls' school in Rotterdam and boarding schools in Brussels and Bonn. After her education, she devoted herself to charity. She became active in the Roman Catholic Women's Union and other Roman Catholic associations and organizations. At the beginning of World War I, she helped Belgian children.

Meijer entered the House of Representatives on 6 May 1924 as a replacement for the recently deceased Maximilien Joseph Caspar Marie Kolkman. In the House of Representatives, Meijer focused on women's issues, juvenile justice, morality, the prison system, and vocational education. She was the eighth female member of the House of Representatives, and the second female Catholic member. In the 1929 general election, she was elected via the "female quality seat".

Meijer died on 6 July 1954. She was buried in the Roman Catholic cemetery in Crooswijk.

== Personal life ==
Meijer was unmarried as of 1929.

She traveled to places including Russia and Italy. She also enjoyed literature and music.

== Honors ==
- Knight of the Order of the Netherlands Lion
- Medal Reine Elisabeth, also known as the Queen Elisabeth Medal
- Honorary chairwoman of the Roman Catholic Women's Union

== Electoral history ==
Electoral history of Annie Meijer
Year	Body	Party	Pos.	Votes	Result		Ref.
Year	Body	Party	Pos.	Votes	Party seats	Individual	Ref.
1922	House of Representatives	General League of Roman Catholic Electoral Associations	2/3	245		Lost (Note: Later joined as replacement)	
1925	House of Representatives	General League of Roman Catholic Electoral Associations					
1929	House of Representatives	Roman Catholic State Party					
1933	House of Representatives	Roman Catholic State Party					
