= South Lawn car park =

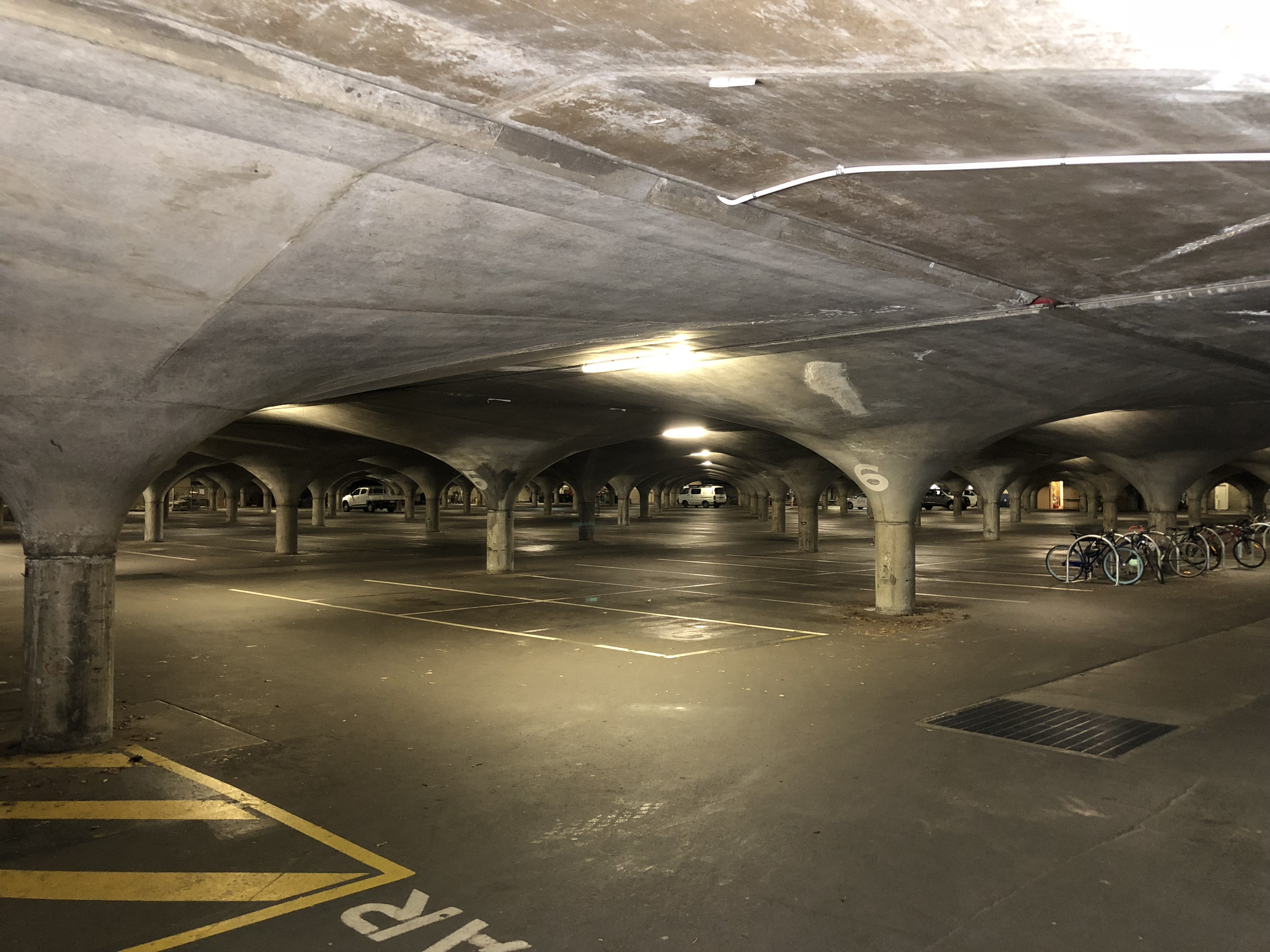
- Interior of the underground car park at The University of Melbourne
- Interactive map of the South Lawn car park area

General information
- Status: Completed
- Type: Car park
- Location: 152-292 Grattan Street, The University of Melbourne, Parkville Campus, Melbourne, Victoria, Australia
- Coordinates: 37°47′55″S 144°57′37″E
- Construction started: May 1971
- Completed: November 1972
- Owner: The University of Melbourne

Technical details
- Structural system: Reinforced concrete shells with parabolic profiles supported on short columns
- Material: Concrete

Design and construction
- Architecture firm: Loder and Bayley; Harris, Lange and Partners
- Engineer: Jan van der Molen
- Other designers: Ellis Stones and Ronald Rayment (landscape)
- Awards: Maggie Edmond Enduring Architecture Award, 2017

Victorian Heritage Register
- Official name: Underground Car Park
- Type: State heritage (built)
- Designated: 6 April 1994
- Reference no.: 3808
- Significance: Registered
- Category: Car park

The South Lawn car park is a parking garage at the University of Melbourne constructed in 1971–72 using an innovative reinforced concrete shells with parabolic profiles supported on short columns structural system designed by Jan van der Molen, an engineer. The car park was added to the Victorian Heritage Register on 6 April 1994.

== History ==
The car park was proposed in the university Campus Master Plan prepared by Bryce Mortlock in 1970, partly to deal with increased demand for parking while retaining the landscape character of the core part of the university. Loder and Bayley, in association with Harris, Lange and Partners, were commissioned to prepare the designs, with Jan van der Molen as engineer in charge. Ellis Stones and Ronald Rayment, the first graduates of a landscape design course in Victoria, undertook the landscape design both above the car park and along the edges facing the Baillieu Library and John Medley Building.

The proposal met with some controversy, with eighteen appeals being made to the Building Regulations Committee before approval was finally granted. John Loder, from Loder and Bayly, was presented with three options reputedly excluded the others and only recommended van der Molen's design to the University.

== Design and construction ==
The design comprises a series of reinforced concrete shells with parabolic profiles supported on short columns. The columns encase pipes to drain the soils above for the planting of lawn and trees of the South Lawn. van der Molen's design of sophisticated hyperbolic-paraboloidal platforms, was described as ...saucer-shaped flowerpots on columns, interconnected to form arches. The deep dishes of the concrete forms allowed large trees to be planted on its roof. Excavations involved substantial earthworks to retain the lawn at the same level of the 'Old Quad' building which was the historic core of the university. Works commenced in May 1971 and the car park was completed by November 1972. The east entrance to the car park incorporates a door from a 1745 house in St Stephen's Green, Dublin, and the west entrance is constructed with the salvaged doorway and is framed by two Atlas figures from the demolished Colonial Bank offices in Elizabeth Street in the Melbourne central business district.

== In popular culture ==
The car park was used as setting for a ballet sequence in an ABC television broadcast, a number of student film projects and art installations, has been featured in many architectural publications and exhibitions, and for the police garage scene in the first Mad Max movie. Architectural historian, Professor Miles Lewis, described the structure at the time, as the... most important non-residential design in the country. This iconic carpark was also part of the set of Geisha's music video "Fool's Way" and Troye Sivan's "You" collaboration with Tate McRae and DJ Regard.

== Gallery ==
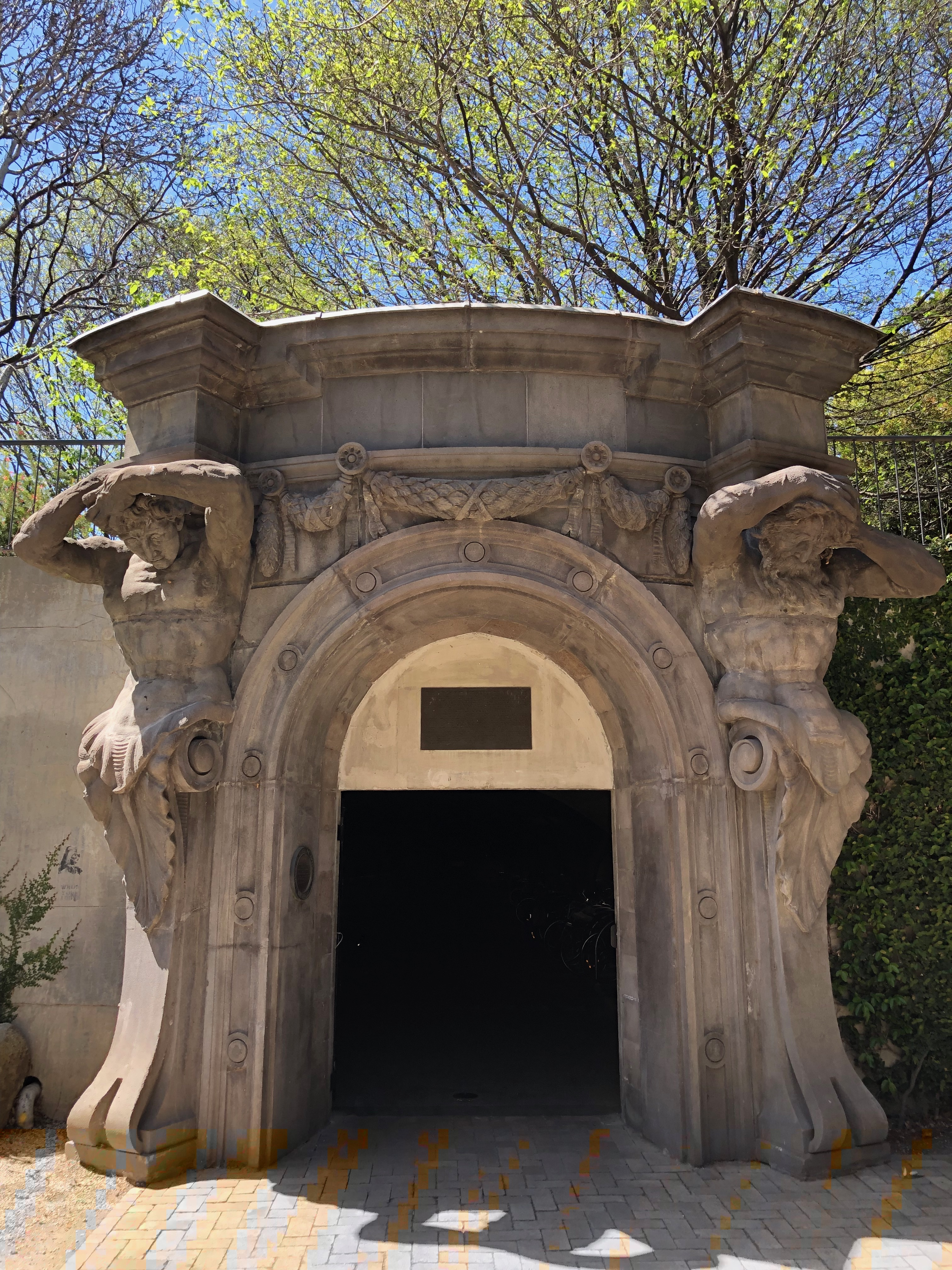
East entrance of the car park, incorporating two Atlas figures, formerly from the Colonial Bank building in Elizabeth Street

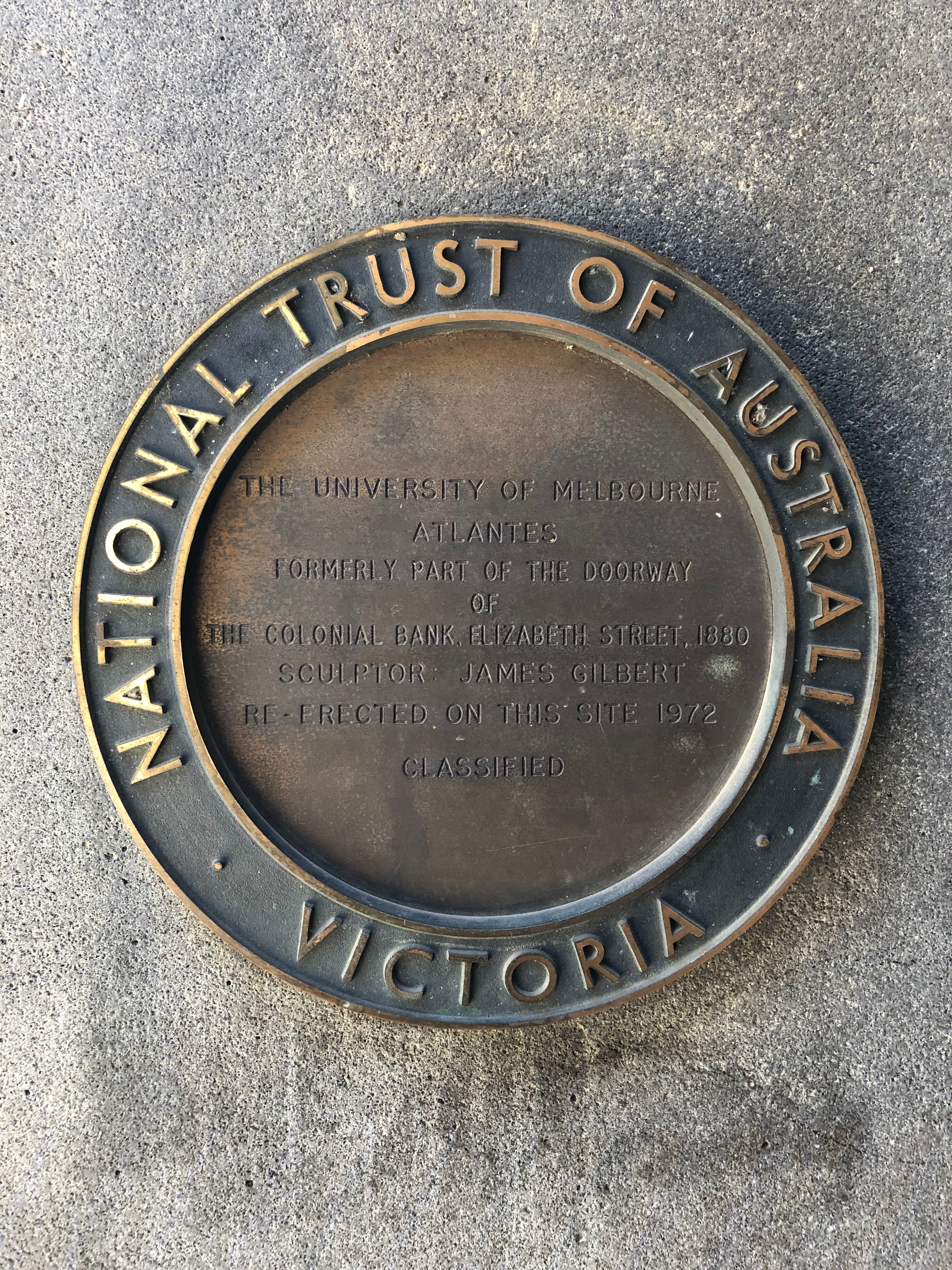
Plaque by the National Trust of Australia (Victoria branch)
