= Perhimpoenan Indonesia =

Indonesian student association in the Netherlands (1908–1942)

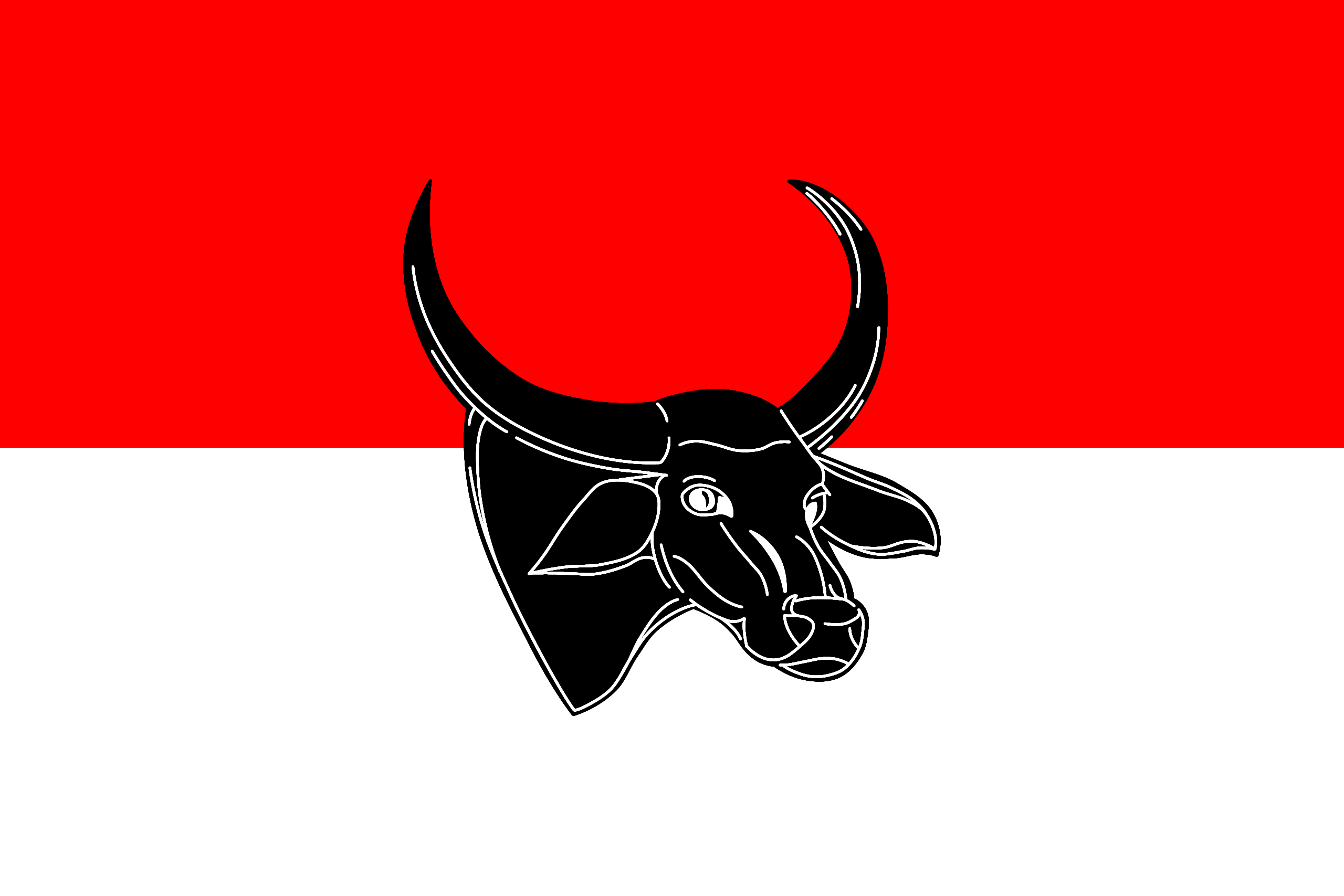
Flag of Perhimpoenan Indonesia

Perhimpoenan Indonesia or PI (English: "Indonesian Association") was an Indonesian student association in the Netherlands in the first half of the twentieth century. It was established under the Dutch name Indische Vereeniging ("Indies' Association"; Malay/Indonesian: Perhimpoenan Hindia). It changed its name to Indonesische Vereeniging ("Indonesian Association") in 1922, and to its Malay translation Perhimpoenan Indonesia in 1925. Although small in membership numbers – throughout the period between 30 and 150 members – the organisation was important because it was one of the first to campaign for Indonesian independence, and because many PI students would later acquire prominent political positions in the independent state of Indonesia.

== Early history ==
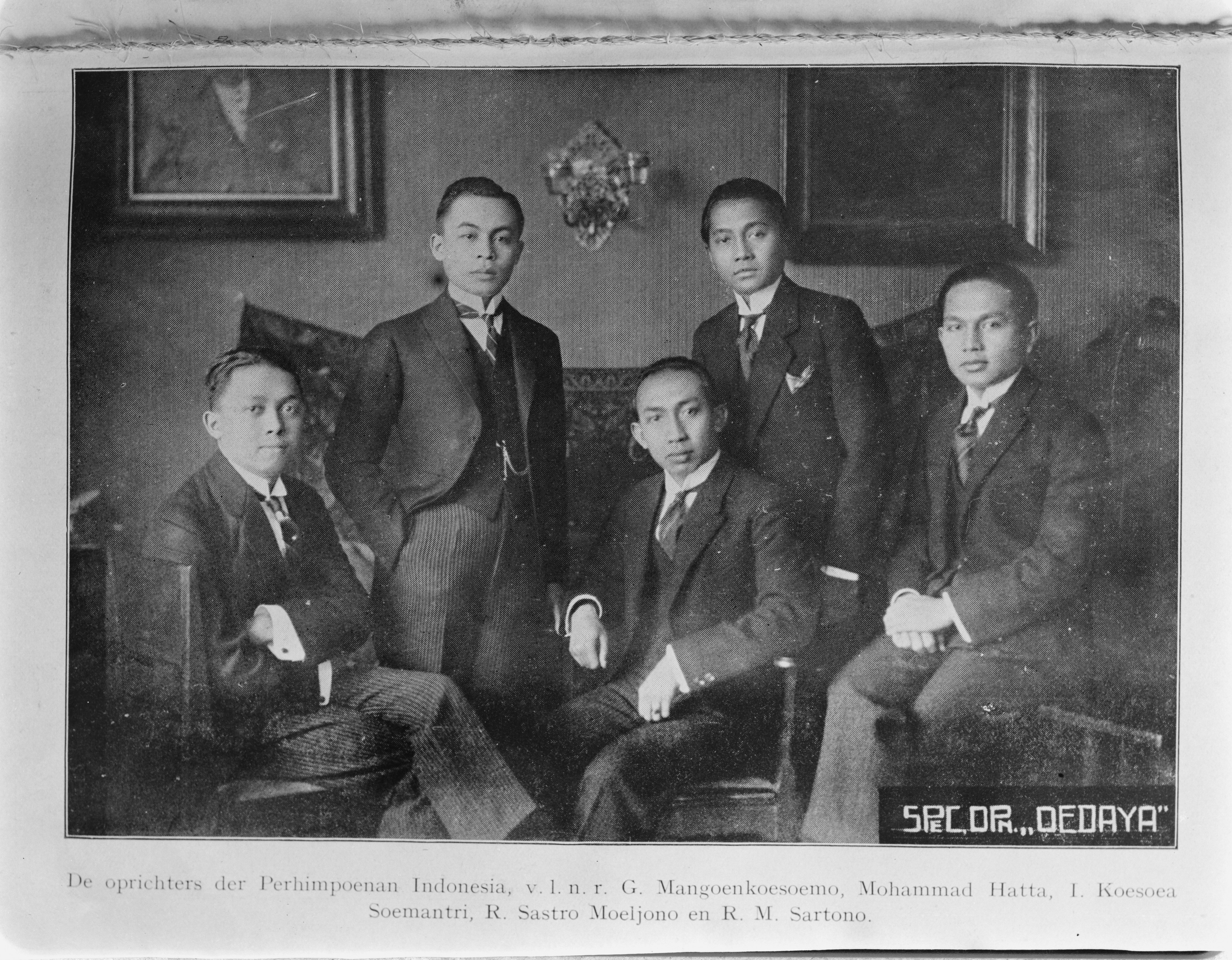
From left to right: Gunawan Mangunkusumo, Mohammad Hatta, Iwa Koesoemasoemantri, Sastromoeljono, and Sartono, c. 1920s

Perhimpoenan Indonesia was established in 1908 under the name Indische Vereeniging and was initially a social club, providing a sociable environment for students from the Dutch East Indies in the Netherlands. After the First World War the association politicised and changed its name to Indonesische Vereeniging in 1922 and to Perhimpoenan Indonesia in 1925. From that moment onwards, it was an explicitly anti-colonial, nationalist organisation with a strong anti-capitalist outlook. This was clearly visible in its journal Indonesia Merdeka ("Independent Indonesia").

The new principles of 1925 were:

1. "Only a united Indonesia putting aside particularistic differences, can break the power of the oppressors. The common aim – the creation of a free Indonesia – demands the building of nationalism based on a conscious self-reliant mass action. [...]
2. An essential condition for the achievement of this aim is the participation of all layers of the Indonesian people in a unified struggle for Independence.
3. The essential and dominant element in every colonial political problem is the conflict of interest between the rulers and the ruled. The tendency of the ruling side to blur and mask this must be countered by a sharpening and accentuation of this conflict of interests."

Important students in the first half of the 1920s were Soetomo, Mohamed Nazir Datoek Pamontjak, Mohammad Hatta, and Achmad Soebardjo. In the late 1920s and the 1930s Soetan Sjahrir, Abdulmadjid Djojoadhiningrat, and Roestam Effendi gained in prominence. Via the return of its members, the PI was influential in the forging of a nationalist non-cooperationist movement in the Dutch East Indies. (Former) PI members stood at the basis of the establishment of the Indonesian nationalist organisations PNI and PPPKI.

== Foreign action ==
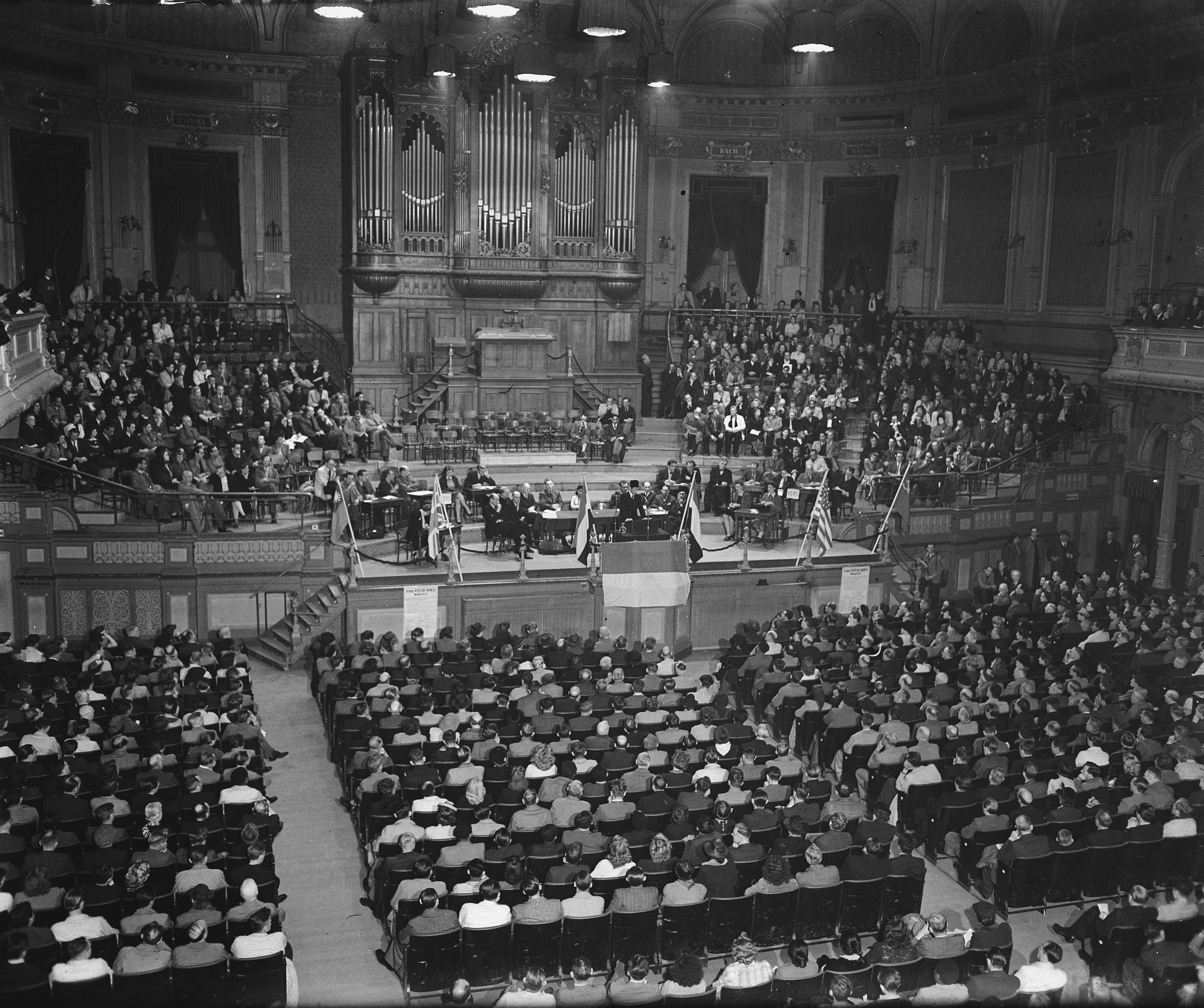
A Perhimpoenan Indonesia conference in Amsterdam, 4 October 1945

After the nationalist turn, the PI saw it as one of its principal tasks to seek support from anti-colonial and anti-imperialist organisations and movements in other parts of Europe. It also wanted to demonstrate the crimes and horrors of Dutch colonialism in the Dutch East Indies to the outside world. By sending informal "ambassadors" to Paris, Brussels, and Berlin the Indonesian students established contact with prominent activists and anti-colonial movements, among whom Jawaharlal Nehru of the Indian National Congress, Messali Hadj of the Algerian Étoile Nord-Africaine, and activists of the Chinese Kuomintang. Indonesian students were also present at the pacifist Congrès Democratique International in August 1926 in the French town of Bierville, and at several meetings of the League against Imperialism from February 1927 onwards. Mohammad Hatta, who was the chair and most important of the Indonesian students, was appointed to the executive committee of the LAI, and thus acquired much prominence and an extensive international network.

== Persecution of the students ==
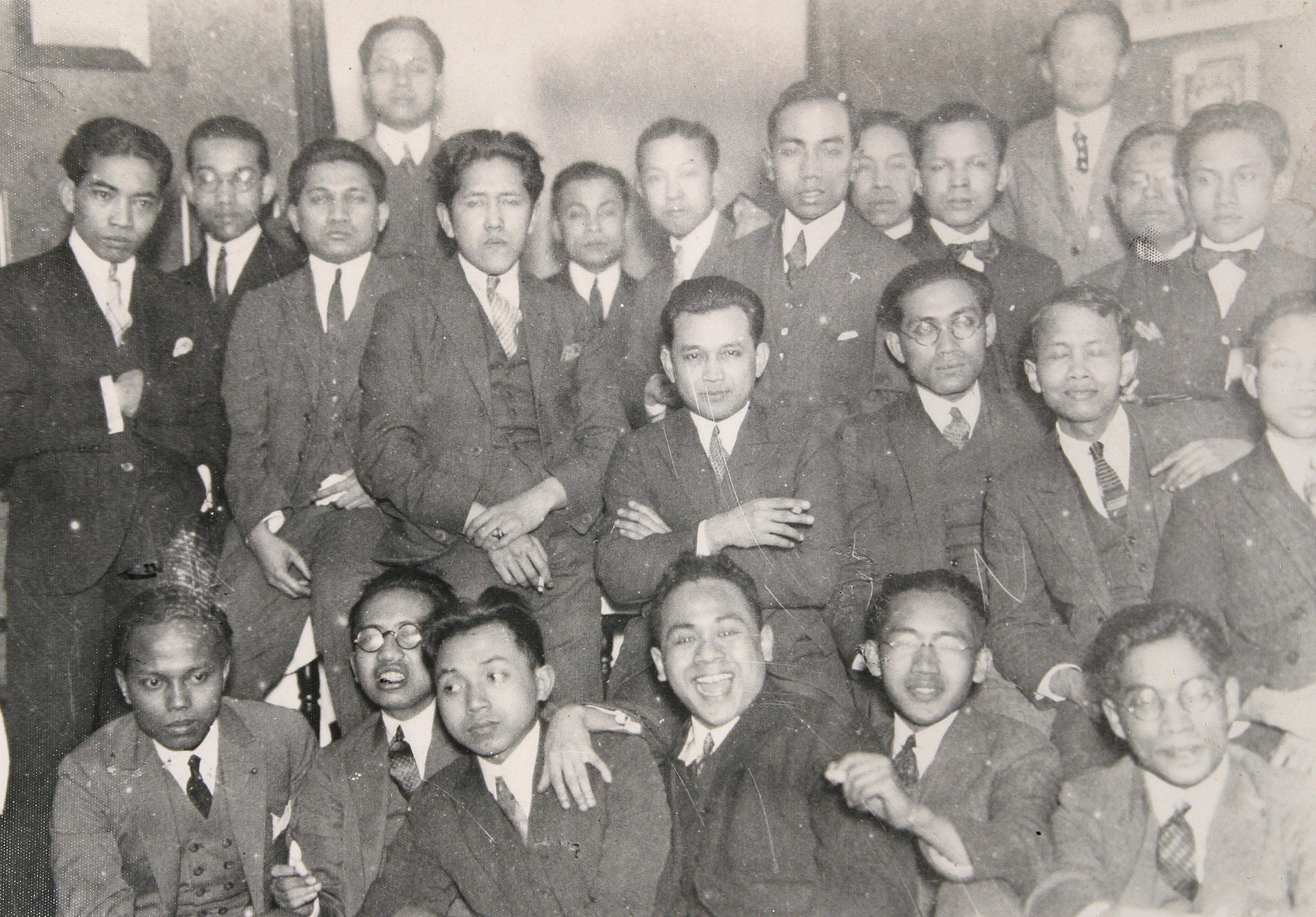
Seen here are notable student members Ali Sastroamidjojo, Mohammad Hatta, Achmad Soebardjo, Soenario, Wirjono Prodjodikoro, Boedhiarto, and Singgih at Perhimpoenan Indonesia in Leiden

Troubled by the foreign activities of Perhimpoenan Indonesia and its contacts with the Communist International, Dutch authorities decided to crack down on the students in 1927, and to charge the students with sedition in Indonesia Merdeka. On 10 June 1927 house raids took place in Leiden and The Hague, in which many documents were seized. On 23 September, Mohammad Hatta, Ali Sastroamidjojo, Abdoelmadjid Djojoadhiningrat and Nazir Pamontjak were arrested and put under charge. The court case, which took place in March 1928, led to the release of all the students. The PI and Hatta gained much publicity in the Netherlands and the Dutch East Indies. The brochure Independent Indonesia which Hatta wrote in jail became a widely read document among Indonesian nationalists.

== Post-1930s ==
Nonetheless, the confrontation with the authorities also prompted many of the most active students to refrain from further activities, and the PI's membership dwindled. Largely inactive, the leadership of the association was finally taken up by a group of communist Indonesian students under Abdulmadjid Djojoadhiningrat. Prominent nationalists, among whom Hatta and Sjahrir, were expelled from the association, and de facto the PI became a front organisation of the Communist Party of Holland (CPH).

PI chair Roestam Effendi was elected to the House of Representatives as part of the CPH in the 1933 Dutch general election, becoming the first Indonesian member of the Dutch parliament.

=== Resistance against Nazi occupation ===
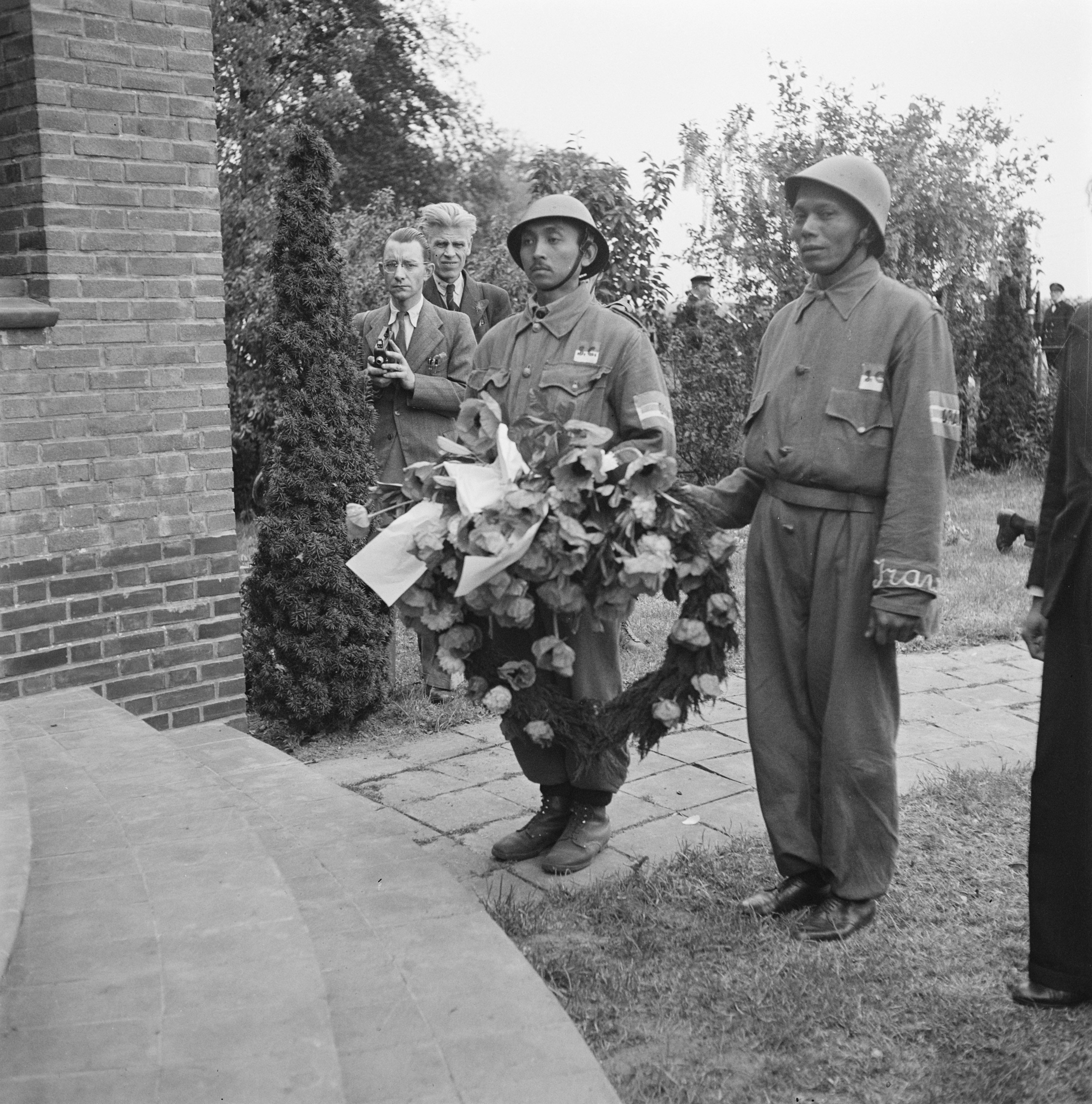
Two Indonesian members of the Groep Irawan of the Binnenlandse Strijdkrachten lay a wreath at the Haagsche Schouw war monument in Leiden on 14 May 1945. "Irawan" is visible on the sleeve of the uniform.

As a result of the German occupation of the Netherlands during the Second World War, students and members of the Perhimpoenan Indonesia were stranded and unable to return to the Dutch East Indies.

Being the nucleus of the inception for idea of "Indonesia", members of the Perhimpoenan Indonesia believed that fascism could bring an end to the idea of a future Indonesian state and independence struggle. During this time the PI's motto was, "First liberate the Netherlands then Indonesia." Thus, between 60 and 110 PI members participated in the resistance against fascism, regardless of political, cultural, and religious conviction. What remains of the members of the Perhimpoenan Indonesia would side with members of the Dutch resistance and take active participation in printing papers, saboteur, organising rallies amongst Indonesian university students (Mahasiswa), and even hiding Jews and other people persecuted by the Nazis in Leiden.

In June 1941, the Sicherheitsdienst raided Indonesian student residences looking for leading members of the Indonesian resistance group around Perhimpoenan Indonesia. Students were captured by the Nazis and sent to concentration camps, notably R.M. Sidartawan, who died in Dachau concentration camp.

Members of the Perhimpoenan Indonesia opened its cause to everyday Indonesians stuck in the Netherlands, including sailors, news reporters, and others in attempt to deny collaboration. The group would later stockpile weapons seized from Germans with the help of Dutch resistance and collected at Leiden. Members of the PI would then create a resistance detachment under the Dutch resistance with the name "Groep Irawan Soejono", in honour of PI member and son of Adipati Soejono, Irawan Soejono, who was shot by German soldiers during a raid whilst carrying parts of a stencil machine on a bicycle for the PI's underground newspaper.

The Perhimpoenan Indonesia and Indonesian members of the Binnenlandse Strijdkrachten were among the few Indonesians who helped the Dutch in the liberation of Leiden. Among the 800 Indonesians stranded in the Netherlands, it is estimated that at least 86 to 100 Indonesians died, a 10% mortality rate, with a vast majority perishing due to tuberculosis, severe malnutrition, and freezing conditions during the harsh winters. Between 1940‒1944 alone, 12 of the 39 Indonesian students at Leiden University died, largely from tuberculosis. Eight other Indonesians died fighting for the Indonesian independence struggle in the Netherlands against Nazi Germany.

== Post-war ==
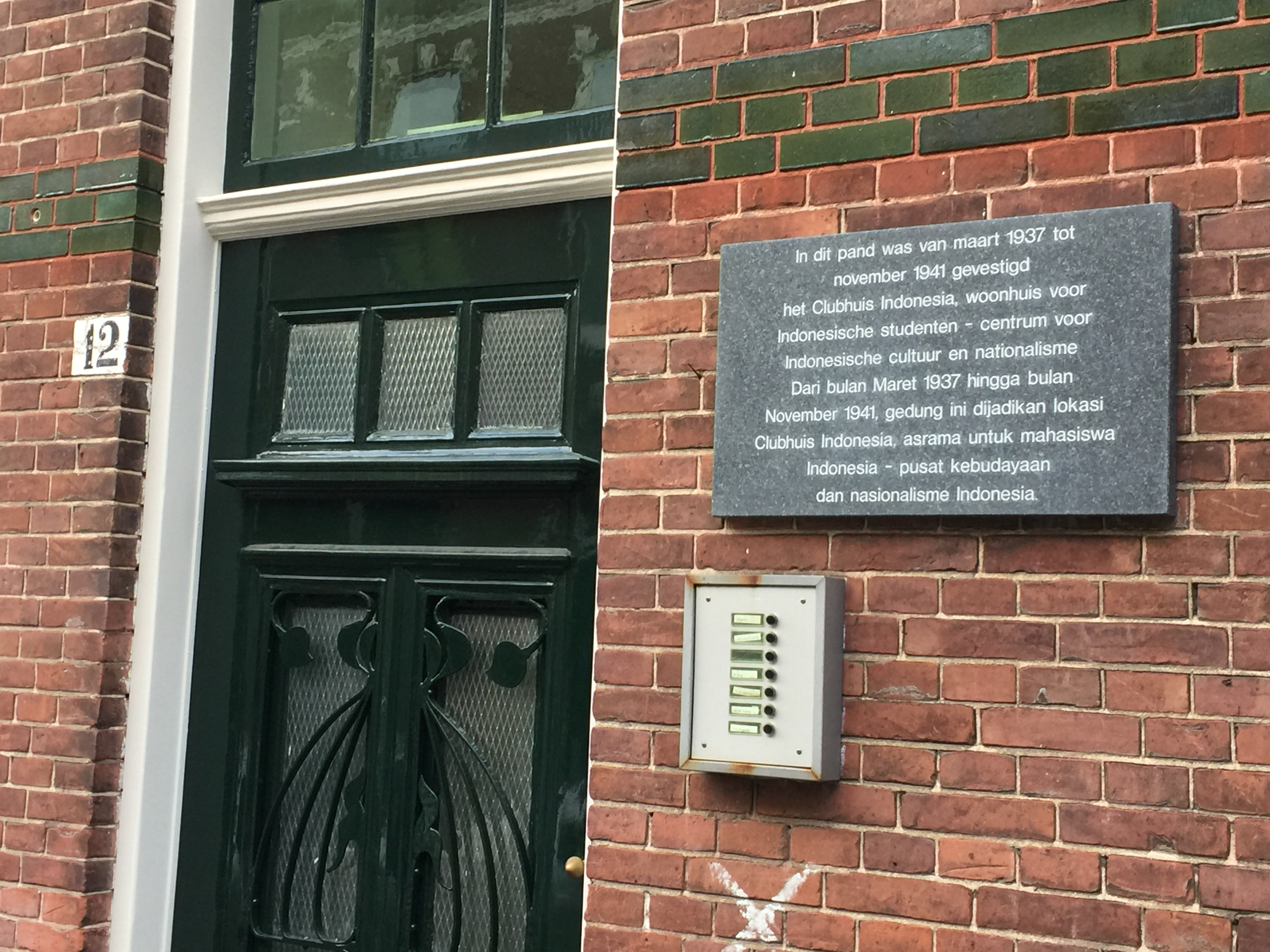
A plaque commemorating the Indonesian students who rallied for Indonesian nationalism at Hugo de Grootstraat 12 in Leiden

After the war, the Perhimpoenan Indonesia organisation was thought to be inactive. However the Perhimpunan Pelajar Indonesia, formed in 1952, claimed direct lineage to the group.
