= Mohamed Nazir Datoek Pamontjak =

Indonesian politician and diplomat (1897–1966)

- Mohamed Nazir Datoek Pamontjak in 1928

Ambassador of Indonesia to the Philippines
- In office 1956–1965
- President: Soekarno
- Preceded by: Alexander Andries Maramis
- Succeeded by: Abdul Karim Rasjid

Ambassador of Indonesia to France
- In office 1950–1953
- President: Soekarno
- Preceded by: Position established
- Succeeded by: Ide Anak Agung Gde Agung

Member of the Dutch Senate
- In office 20 November 1945 – 23 July 1946

Personal details
- Born: 10 April 1897 Solok, Dutch East Indies
- Died: 10 July 1966 (aged 69) Manila, Philippines
- Party: Independent
- Education: Leiden University

Mohamed Nazir Datoek Pamontjak (10 April 1897 – 10 July 1966) was an Indonesian politician and diplomat. As an Indonesian student in the Netherlands, he was a chairman of the Perhimpoenan Indonesia student organization from 1924. He participated in the Dutch resistance during World War II, and following the war was appointed to the Dutch Senate from November 1945 to July 1946. After returning to Indonesia, he became a diplomat, serving as the Indonesian ambassador in France and the Philippines.

== Early life ==
Mohamed Nazir Datoek Pamontjak was born on 10 April 1897 in Solok, in the Dutch East Indies. He was of Minangkabau descent. He attended secondary school at the Hogere Burgersschool Koning Willem III in Batavia, where he was one of only a handful of "native" Indonesian students. Pamontjak was one of the founders of the Jong Sumatranen Bond, an organization which campaigned for the rights of the people of Sumatra, in Batavia in 1917. He recruited a 15-year-old Mohammad Hatta at a meeting in Padang that year, the two becoming close friends and political associates, and encouraged Hatta to become treasurer of the Jong Sumatranen Bond branch in Padang.

== Dutch period ==
In 1917, Pamontjak, along with his schoolmates Achmad Soebardjo and Alex Maramis, decided to study in the Netherlands after graduating, but were unable to due to World War I. Pamontjak arrived in the Netherlands in 1919, one of the first Indonesian students to arrive in the Netherlands following the end of World War I. He began studying law at Leiden University on 29 November 1920.

In 1920, Pamontjak became involved in the Indische Vereeniging, from 1922 known as Perhimpoenan Indonesia (PI), serving as the organization's treasurer. In 1924, Pamontjak was chosen as chairman of Perhimpoenan Indonesia. In 1927, Pamontjak was one of several Indonesian delegates to the Congress Against Colonial Oppression and Imperialism in Paris, organized by Willi Münzenberg and the Workers International Relief, where Pamontjak served as a spokesperson for the delegation. During the congress, Pamontjak spoke about the November 1926 communist uprisings in the region, and successfully proposed a motion expressing solidarity with the people of the Dutch East Indies.

Throughout 1927 and 1928, the PI came under increasing surveillance from the Dutch government, and Pamontjak's parents were threatened by government officials to get them to stop financially supporting their son. On September 1927, Pamontjak, along with Hatta, Ali Sastroamidjojo, and Abdulmadjid Djojoadhiningrat were arrested during a police raid and charged with membership of a criminal organization, though the charge was later changed to sedition. Following a widely publicized trial, in which the students were assisted by Social Democratic Workers' Party (SDAP) MP Jan Duijs, all four defendants were acquitted in March 1928 and freed from jail. In 1931, Pamontjak left for Indonesia intending to return quickly to finish his studies, but was only able to do so in 1938.

During World War II, Pamontjak, along with the rest of Perhimpoenan Indonesia, participated in the Dutch resistance. In 1940, he obtained his master's degree. He then worked for the PI's legal advice bureau. From 1943, Pamontjak was one of the editors of the PI's illegal newspaper Feiten, and was able to escape arrest in 1944 when the German occupiers arrested three of the seven editors on 3 April 1944. Pamontjak subsequently became editor-in-chief of the PI's next illegal newspaper, De Bevrijding, which was headquartered in his home, which also served as a center for general PI resistance activity.

Following the end of the war, Pamontjak was one of two representatives of Perhimpoenan Indonesia in the Dutch parliament, Together with Setyadjit Soegondo in the House of Representatives, taking up seats vacated by the National Socialist Movement (NSB). As a senator, Pamontjak spoke once, in opposition to a constitutional amendment allowing for conscripts to be sent overseas. He sat as an independent. He also participated in a government commission on the future of relations between the Netherlands and its Asian colonies, but resigned before the commission was able to release its final report.

== Return to Indonesia ==
Pamontjak returned to Indonesia in December 1946, where he became a diplomat. In 1949, Pamontjak was a member of the Dutch–Indonesian Round Table Conference. He served as ambassador for Indonesia to France from 1950 to 1953, and as ambassador to the Philippines from 1957.

Mohamed Nazir Datoek Pamontjak died on 10 July 1966 in Manila.

== Bibliography ==
- Poeze, Harry A. (1986). In het land van de overheerser: I: Indonesiërs in Nederland 1600-1950 (in Dutch). Dordrecht, Netherlands; Cinnaminson, United States: Foris Publications. ISBN 9067652016.
- Stutje, Klaas (2016-06-15). Behind the Banner of Unity: Nationalism and anticolonialism among Indonesian students in Europe, 1917-1931. Amsterdam: University of Amsterdam.
