= Pius Arts =

Dutch politician (1881–1955)

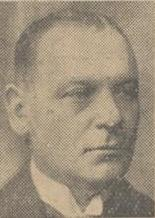
- Pius Arts in 1933

Member of the House of Representatives
- In office 15 September 1925 – 17 September 1929
- In office 9 May 1933 – 8 June 1937

Personal details
- Born: Pius Maria Arts; 29 September 1881 Roermond
- Died: 20 December 1955 (aged 74) Tilburg
- Party: AB (until 1922); Arts List (1922); Roman Catholic People's Party (1923-1933); Catholic Democratic Party (1933-1939); RKSP (1939-1945); Free Arts List (1946-1949); KVP (1949-1955)

Pius Maria Arts (29 September 1881 – 20 December 1955) was a Dutch politician. He was a member of the House of Representatives from 1925 to 1929 and from 1933 to 1937 as leader of the Roman Catholic People's Party (RKVP).

== Biography ==
Pius Maria Arts was born on 29 September 1881 in Roermond to Antoine Arts, who served in the House of Representatives for the Roman Catholic State Party (RKSP) from 1901 to 1922. Pius Arts completed secondary school in Den Bosch, and became a lawyer in Tilburg. In 1913, he was elected to the municipal council of Tilburg as a member of the General League of Roman Catholic Electoral Associations (AB), serving until 1923, and in 1919 he became a member of the provincial council of North Brabant, serving until 1939.

In 1901, Arts became the chairman of the Willem II football club in Tilburg, a position which he would hold until 1919. He also played as a right back for the team between 1905 and 1908. Under his chairmanship, Willem II would win the 1915–16 Netherlands Football League Championship and become national champions. He also served as a board member of the KNVB.

Antoine had split off from the AB to run on an independent list for the 1922 Dutch general election, with his son Pius as the only other candidate. While this was unsuccessful, the Arts family's popularity in Tilburg and dissatisfaction over the church hierarchy's condemnation of them would earn the list 38% of the vote in the city.

Pius Arts joined the small Roman Catholic People's Party (RKVP) in 1923, an organisation founded by a handful of Amsterdam government employees who opposed the AB's conservatism, as a result of his disdain for the AB and his father's treatment at their hands. Arts quickly became leader, and following a campaign focused on particularist concerns in Tilburg the RKVP was able to obtain a single seat in the House of Representatives in the 1925 general election, which was taken by Arts. While being to the left economically compared to the RKSP, Arts also supported lifting restrictions on Catholic processions and Catholic missionary activity in the Dutch East Indies. The party was roundly ignored by the Catholic press and disappeared from the House of Representatives after failing to win a seat in the 1929 Dutch general election.

In the early 1930s, the RKVP would undergo a process of professionalisation, establishing itself ideologically more clearly as a progressive alternative to the RKSP. In 1933, Arts was reelected to the House of Representatives, and that same year the RKVP would merge with the minor Catholic Democratic League led by Johannes Antonius Veraart, forming the Catholic Democratic Party (KDP). However, this party had little electoral success, losing its only seat in the 1937 general election and merging into the RKSP in 1939. Following World War II, Arts returned to local politics, being elected to the Tilburg municipal council on his own "Free Arts List" (Vrije Lijst-Arts) in 1946, though his group would merge into the mainstream Catholic People's Party (KVP) in 1949.

Pius Arts died on 20 December 1955 in Tilburg.

== Bibliography ==
- Vossen, Koen (2003). Vrij vissen in het Vondelpark: kleine politieke partijen in Nederland 1918 - 1940 (PDF). Amsterdam: Wereldbibliotheek. ISBN 978-90-284-2009-0.
