= Jan van der Molen =

Jan Ludzer "Dick" van der Molen (16 November 1924 – 6 November 2015), was a Dutch-born structural engineer who worked and taught in Holland, Indonesia and Australia.

== Education and career ==
Van der Molen was born on 16 November 1924 in Amsterdam, The Netherlands, as the second son of a Frisian family. In the 1930s he moved with his family to Eindhoven, and was educated at the Lorentz Lyceum. He studied aeronautical engineering but an accident left him blind in one eye and so ended his glider-pilot training. During World War II under German occupation, but Eindhoven was liberated by the Allied army on 18 September 1944 and so Van der Molen went to England for military training and joined the army engineers in 1945. While in England, he married Evelyn Danks, and his first son was born there. After completing his training he returned to Eindhoven, and then on 24 September 1946, was part of an engineering battalion stationed in Indonesia to restore infrastructure in West Java. The engineering battalion built over 1000 bridges before being returned to Netherlands in 1950. However, Van der Molen, along with several sappers, chose to be demobilised in Indonesia.

== Emigration to Australia ==
In 1950, he emigrated to Australia and was involved in the Snowy Mountains Scheme between 1950 and 1952, followed by work on Singapore plantations where he married a second time to June Sullivan and his second son was born. He also worked for the Dutch firm Havenwerken N.V. in Turkey, the Shell refinery at Corio, Geelong extensions to the Portland wharf, the launching platform for Westgate bridge concrete spans, and the design of McIntyre Bridge, a cable-stayed pedestrian and sewer bridge over the Barwon River in Geelong. Completed in 1967, this was one of the first applications of computer-aided bridge design in Australia.

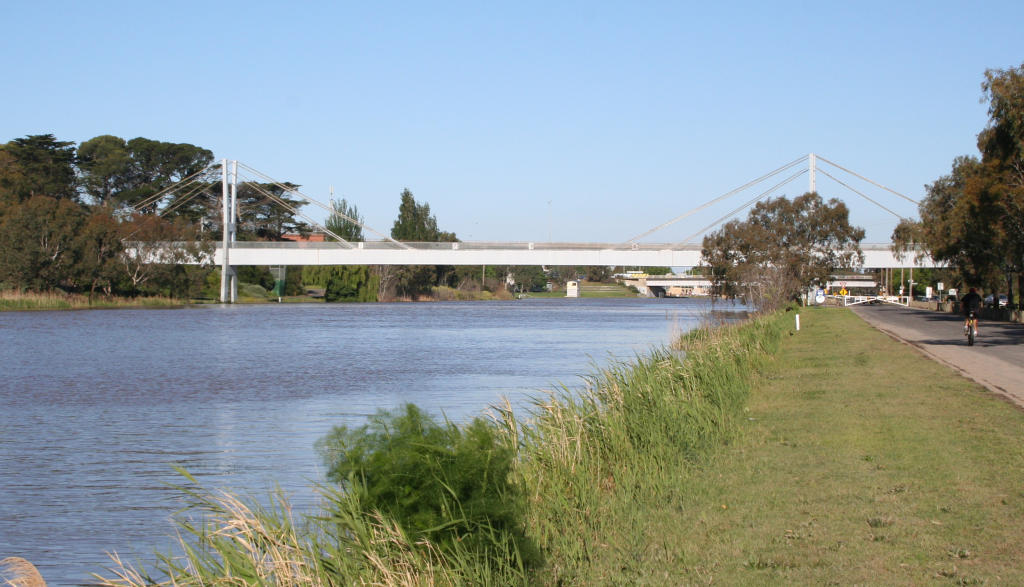
McIntyre-bridge-geelong

In the same year he designed the suspension pipeline for carrying mine slurry over the Savage River, Tasmania. He later assisted with the computer-aided design of the concrete hyperbolic-paraboloidal Rosebud Sound Shell with local architect Ronald F Murcott, and specialist input from CSIRO engineers Dr John Brotchie, erected by builder Trevor Luck in 1968-69 for the Rosebud Foreshore Committee.

In Australia he was chief civil/structural engineer with Bechtel Pacific and chief structural engineer with Camp Scott & Furphy. He was prominent in the reconstruction of bridges in Indonesia after World War Two, innovative concrete structural designs in Australia, and his late life involvement in engineering heritage conservation.

In 1971 he designed the concrete structure for the South Lawn car park at Melbourne University, described as ...saucer-shaped flowerpots on columns, interconnected to form arches. This employed sophisticated hyperbolic-paraboloidal platforms to allow large trees to be planted on its roof. John Loder, of the firm Loder and Bayly, was presented with three options reputedly excluded the others and only recommended Van der Molen's design to the university. Its innovative design earned Dick an award of excellence from the Concrete Institute of Australia.

== Academic Career and retirement ==
In 1982 Van der Molen was awarded a master's degree in civil engineering from the University of Melbourne and becoming senior lecturer in concrete design and technology and expert in timber structures. With his wife June he was a member of the Melbourne University alumni bushwalking group and involved in conservation work at "Urimburra" in the Little Desert.

He played an important role in the campaign for the preservation and heritage listing of the 1913-1916 Ovoid Sewer Aqueduct over the Barwon River at Geelong. He undertook a structural analysis of the bridge which showed that it was still safe, and also embarked on a study tour in Western Europe to investigate restoration techniques for reinforced concrete heritage structures reporting his findings to Heritage Victoria. For this work, and his research for heritage listing of the Tasmanian Ross River Bridge, he received an award of merit from Engineering Heritage Australia in 2007. In 1999, at the age of 75, he retired from university and commenced investigations into the success and failure of engineering projects, resulting in the award of a PhD in 2006 from Newcastle University. Van der Molen moved to Hobart and in 2000 became a member of Engineering Heritage Tasmania running the oral history program. He presented papers at two Engineering Heritage Conferences, in Auckland in 2000 and in Canberra in 2001. He was an expert witnesses for the City of Greater Dandenong’s nomination of Waverley Park football ground to the Victorian Heritage Register.

== Works ==
- Rosebud Sound Shell Flickr image
- South Lawn Car Park, University of Melbourne Flickr image Flickr image
- Curing of concrete, Thesis (M.Eng.Sc.) University of Melbourne, 1982.
- Towards Engineered Timber Structures with an Australian Identity, First National Structural Engineering Conference 1987: Preprints of Papers. Co-author: H.B. Day
- Earthquake resistance of buildings with High-Strength Reinforced Concrete columns
- Sprayed Concrete Sandwich Building Panel, Innovation and Economics in Building Conference 1991: Preprints of Papers.
- Early Reinforced Concrete Structures - a Heritage Issue, Second Australasian Conference on Engineering Heritage, Auckland, 14–16 February 2000: Proceedings. Co-author: P.F.B. Alsop.
- Roads, Bridges - and Federation, Eleventh National Conference on Engineering Heritage: Federation Engineering a Nation; Proceedings, 2001. Co-author: M.E.C. Lazenby.
- An investigation into structural failure, Thesis (Ph.D.) University of Newcastle, School of Engineering, (N.S.W.) 2006.
- Structural Failures: The Social Context, Australasian Structural Engineering Conference 2008: Engaging with Structural Engineering.
