= Peter Johannes Rutten =

Dutch politician

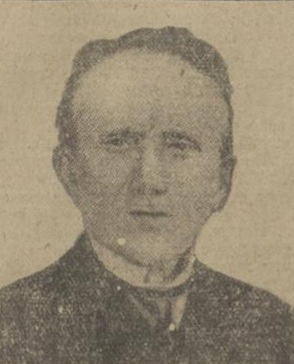
P.J. Rutten

Peter Johannes Rutten (9 December 1864 in Afferden (Limburg) – 3 September 1953 in Wanssum) was a Dutch politician.
