= Jan Duijs =

Dutch politician (1877–1941)

- Jan Duijs in 1913

Member of the House of Representatives
- In office 21 September 1909 – 8 June 1937
- Preceded by: Klaas de Boer Czn.
- Succeeded by: Constituency abolished
- Constituency: Zaandam (until 1918)

Member of the Provincial Council of North Holland
- In office 5 July 1910 – 3 July 1923

Personal details
- Born: Jan Eliza Wilhelm Duijs; 21 February 1877 Nijmegen, Netherlands
- Died: 16 September 1941 (aged 64) Amsterdam, Netherlands
- Party: SDAP (1902–1935); Independent (1935–1938); Dutch People's Party (1938); NSB (1938–1941)
- Spouse(s): Mathilde Adriane Marie Teusse (m. 1903; div. 1917) Cornelia Johanna Quirina van Wijk (m. 1918)
- Children: 1
- Education: Leiden University

Jan Eliza Wilhelm Duijs (21 February 1877 – 16 September 1941) was a Dutch politician. A long-time member of the Social Democratic Workers' Party (SDAP), Duijs became the first socialist alderman in the Netherlands in Zaandam. He served in the Dutch House of Representatives from 1909 to 1937, where he became known as a charismatic and often colourful figure. In later life, Duijs turned away from leftist politics, being expelled from the SDAP in 1935 and joining the fascist National Socialist Movement (NSB) in 1938.

== Early life ==
Jan Duijs was born on 21 February 1877 in Nijmegen to Gideon Herbert Duijs, a trader in colonial goods, and Maria Adriana Breunis. His mother died when Jan Duijs was at a young age, and his father did not concern himself with Jan's education, sending him off to various Protestant boarding schools. Jan Duijs returned to Nijmegen to attend secondary school, but due to his bad behaviour his father sent him off to sea in 1890, reportedly telling the captain he could do anything to his son but drown him. Jan Duijs then worked for eighteen months as a sailor on a steamship from Amsterdam to Hull, before returning to Nijmegen to complete his secondary education. After being rejected from sailing due to a "bad chest", Duijs decided to become a notary, managing to complete his exams in 1900, after a failed first attempt in 1897. He became a candidate notary in Ootmarsum in 1900, moving to Amsterdam in 1901.

During this period, he became involved with the reactionary philosopher and future fascist Gerard Bolland, after Duijs had sent an anti-Catholic pamphlet he had written to Bolland and he had shown interest in it. Duijs developed strong anti-clerical views, publishing a 1904 "critical-polemic study" titled Kerk en Maatschappij in which he decried the influence of the Christian church on society.

== Political career ==
Duijs first became interested in politics during his time in Amsterdam. He followed the economics lectures of Willem Treub, publicly debated minister of finance Nicolaas Pierson in 1901, and joined the Social Democratic Workers' Party (SDAP) after he had been impressed by the performance of Pieter Jelles Troelstra in the 1902 by-election in the Amsterdam IX electoral district. Within the SDAP, Duijs was focused more on practical politics rather than socialist theory, and became chairman of the SDAP branch in Amsterdam IX in 1903.

=== In Zaandam ===
In 1906, Duijs became a paid propagandist for the SDAP in Zaandam, where he initially worked under Maup Mendels before succeeding Mendels as editor-in-chief of the local SDAP newspaper De Voorpost. He became known as an able speaker and writer and contributed greatly to the SDAP's electoral fortunes. He also became known for his debating skills, and in 1905 infamously debated and defeated Anti-Revolutionary Party politician G.J. Sybrandi so thoroughly that Sybrandi left politics entirely soon after. Duijs was first elected to the municipal council of Zaandam in 1907.

In 1910, Duijs was elected to the Provincial Council of North Holland and in 1912, he became an alderman in Zaandam, the first SDAP member to do so in the Netherlands. As an alderman, Duijs was responsible for labour affairs and municipal companies, and caused controversy upon his appointment by announcing his intention to retain the right to criticise the mayor and other aldermen. He succeeded in obtaining an eight-hour work day for municipal employees and turning a municipal gas plant into a profit-making entity. Duijs's personal popularity contributed to the SDAP obtaining an absolute majority of seats on the Zaandam municipal council in 1913. This led to the appointment of Kornelis ter Laan as the first socialist mayor in the Netherlands, whom Duijs would later accuse of being concerned only with the interests of the capitalist class due to Ter Laan's fiscal conservatism. Between 1915 and 1919, all aldermen in Zaandam belonged to the SDAP. After the party lost its absolute majority on the Zaandam municipal council in 1919, Duijs insisted the SDAP take a more radical approach and confront the national government over its stance on unemployment insurance. In 1923, Duijs resigned from all his municipal positions in Zaandam and from the Provincial Council of North Holland and moved to The Hague to focus on his law studies at Leiden University.

=== House of Representatives (1909–1937) ===
Duijs first became a member of the House of Representatives following the 1909 Dutch general election, representing the Zaandam district until the abolition of electoral districts in 1918. As an MP, Duijs was the SDAP's spokesperson on social security, becoming known as an expert on social insurance policy, and later on justice. Within the SDAP, Duijs was generally known as a moderate, taking the reformist side in the 1909 internal conflict over the leftist newspaper De Tribune, which led to the founding of the leftist Social Democratic Party. He also advocated SDAP participation in government coalitions in the 1910s. In the 1910s and 1920s, he was also an anti-militarist, strongly opposing efforts at strengthening national defence during World War I.

Duijs was known as a forceful debater with a populist speaking style. In 1912, Duijs filibustered a proposed social security law on payments for the disabled and elderly in the House by holding a speech for nine hours in total, the longest speech on the House floor of all time. A year later, Duijs managed to pass an amendment to that law establishing the first state pensions in the Netherlands for around 70,000 elderly people. Duijs further caused public controversy in 1920, when he insulted House Speaker Dirk Fock during a debate, and in 1924 during a debate on Dutch policy towards the Soviet Union. His role would be gradually usurped from the 1920s onward by other figures in the SDAP such as Goswijn Sannes and Evert Kupers.

After obtaining his law degree, Duijs gradually began paying less attention to his role as MP, and in 1926 he founded a law firm in The Hague. As a lawyer, Duijs defended four nationalist students from the Dutch East Indies; Mohammad Hatta, Mohamed Nazir Datoek Pamontjak, Ali Sastroamidjojo, and Abdulmadjid Djojoadhiningrat, who were accused and eventually acquitted of membership in a criminal organisation and sedition. He served in the SDAP's national leadership during this period, and also became an active writer, as well as editor-in-chief of the publication Beschaving en Wetenschap from 1928 to 1931.

=== Turn towards fascism ===
In 1931, Duijs's only daughter died at the age of 11, a loss which his wife saw as a sign from God and which led Duijs to return to Christianity, becoming an adherent of the Oxford Group. In the SDAP, Duijs moved further right, opposing what he saw as many SDAP members' positive stance toward the mutiny on the HNLMS De Zeven Provinciën. In 1933, Duijs published a brochure titled Ter Oriëntering, in which he argued the SDAP should support democracy, the Dutch monarchy, and a strong national defence. Many of these views, including abandoning an exclusive focus on the working class and a rejection of cooperation with communists, would become a part of the SDAP's renewed social democratic ideology in the late 1930s. Its publishing, as well as an interview Duijs gave to the right-wing newspaper De Telegraaf, led to conflicts with party leadership, including Duijs's local SDAP branch in The Hague which demanded he resign his seat in the House, but Duijs's personal popularity prevented further action against him for the time being.

After the election of Adolf Hitler in 1933, Duijs was initially so shocked he temporarily considered emigrating to the United Kingdom. In 1934, an internal investigation was launched led by Willem Bonger, but the resulting report was considered so shocking it was never published. Duijs was denied the right to speak at the SDAP's party congress that year, and walked out while chanting the phrase "long live democracy." Duijs became increasingly estranged from the SDAP, rejecting the party's Plan of Labour in favour of the economic policies of the Third Colijn cabinet. He became increasingly positive towards the National Socialist Movement (NSB), refusing to condemn political violence by the party as the SDAP's justice spokesperson in 1934. A year later, Duijs publicly defended the NSB's right to free speech and serving as a lawyer to an NSB member. In late 1935, Duijs left the SDAP, remaining in the House of Representatives as an independent until 1937. In his last few years, Duijs largely focused on attacking his former party and its leader Willem Albarda for what he saw as their extremist positions.

Duijs became further involved with the Oxford Group, serving as a speaker for the Moral Re-Armament in Switzerland and as far as the United States. In 1936, he published a pamphlet condemning the SDAP as being equally authoritarian as the communists, and decrying its "undemocratic" treatment of the NSB. The pamphlet, which contained antisemitic remarks towards Jewish figures within the SDAP, was positively received by the NSB, being sold in the party's store and positively reviewed in its newspaper Volk en Vaderland. In 1937, Duijs personally received NSB leader Anton Mussert at his new home in Lochem.

In early 1938, Duijs co-founded the Dutch People's Party (Nederlandsche Volkspartij), a party founded on authoritarian and corporatist principles, but which was not explicitly antisemitic. After the Dutch People's Party proved unsuccessful, Duijs became a member of the NSB that same year.

== World War II and death ==
In 1940, following the German invasion of the Netherlands Duijs became editor-in-chief of the Lochemse Courant, where he wrote about the superiority of the "Germanic race". In 1941, Duijs was appointed as a "justice of the peace" by the German occupying forces. A recommendation letter from the NSB described Duijs as a loyal NSB member who "understands the new era and will undertake all efforts to advance the rise of National Socialism in our country."

In September 1941, Duijs was diagnosed as having a brain tumor, which despite an operation led to Duijs's death on 16 September 1941. He was buried three days later by a small group of friends in the same cemetery as his daughter.

A street in Zaandam, originally named after the Jewish writer Herman Heijermans, was renamed in Duijs's honour by the NSB-dominated municipal council in 1942, but was returned to its original name after the end of World War II.

== Personal life ==
Duijs was married twice, his first marriage being to Mathilde Adriane Marie Teusse on 17 September 1903. After divorcing his first wife in 1917, Duijs remarried to Cornelia Johanna Quirina van Wijk on 28 August 1918. With his second wife, Duijs had one daughter, who died in 1931 at the age of 11.

== Bibliography ==
- Stutje, Klaas (2016-06-15). Behind the Banner of Unity: Nationalism and anticolonialism among Indonesian students in Europe, 1917-1931. Amsterdam: University of Amsterdam.
