= Lodewijk Duymaer van Twist =

Dutch politician (1865–1961)

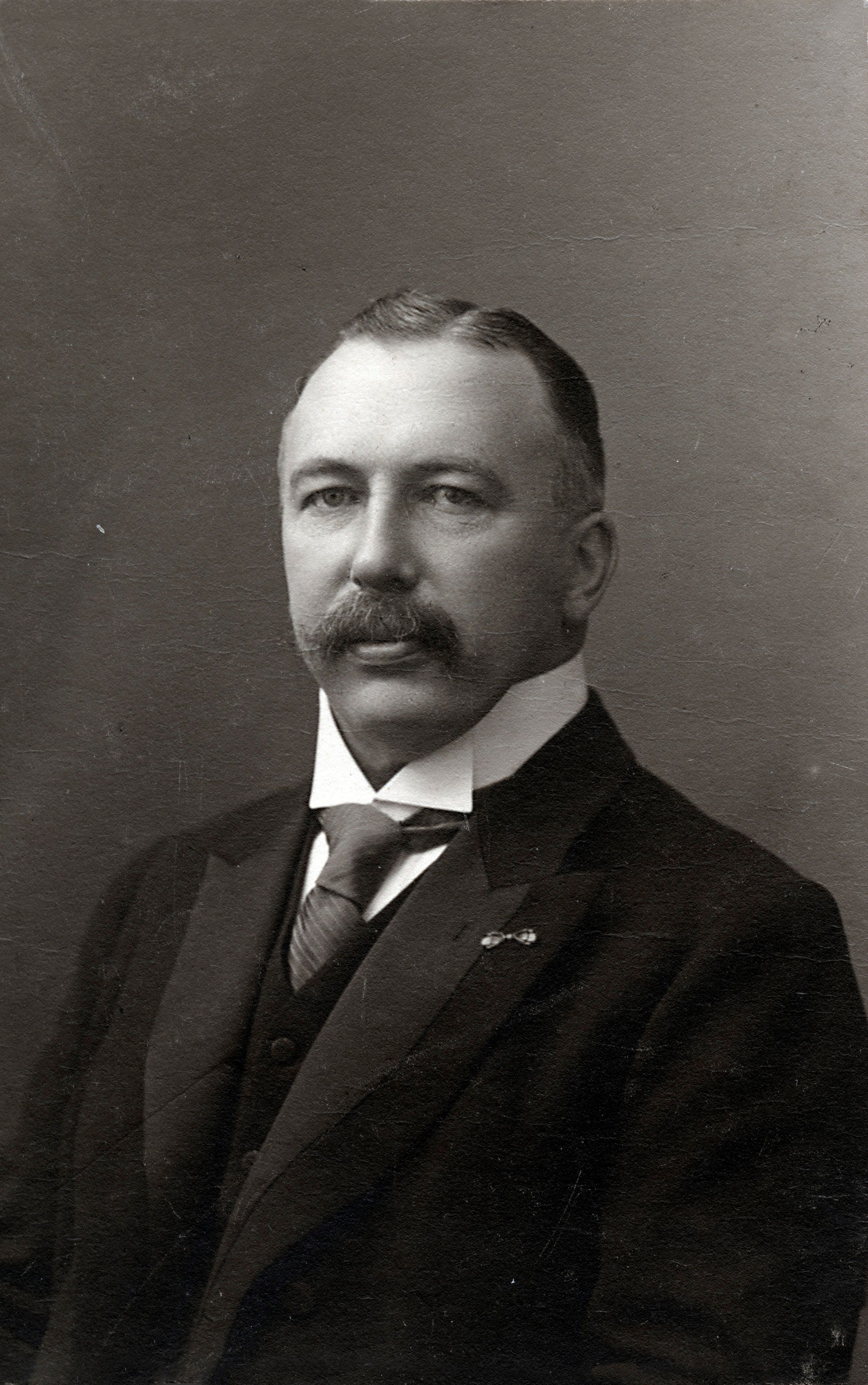
- Lodewijk Duymaer van Twist in 1913

Member of the House of Representatives
- In office 17 September 1901 – 19 June 1905
- Preceded by: Jan Meesters
- In office 15 September 1905 – 4 June 1946
- Constituency: Steenwijk (until 1918)

Personal details
- Born: Lodewijk Franciscus Duymaer van Twist; 9 November 1865 The Hague, Netherlands
- Died: 7 August 1961 (aged 95) The Hague, Netherlands
- Party: ARP
- Spouse: Neeltje Dortland (m. 1903)

Lodewijk Franciscus Duymaer van Twist (9 November 1865 – 7 August 1961) was a Dutch general and politician. He served as a member of the Dutch House of Representatives for the Anti-Revolutionary Party (ARP) from 1901 to 1946, making him the longest serving Dutch member of parliament of all time. He was also a lieutenant general in the Royal Netherlands Army, and the co-founder of the League against Swearing.

== Early life ==
Lodewijk Franciscus Duymaer van Twist was born on 9 November 1865 in The Hague to Willem Lodewijk Franciscus Duymaer van Twist, a pharmacist, and Maria Hendrika Hermanie. After completing his secondary education in The Hague Duymaer van Twist attended an officer's school in Kampen, graduating as second lieutenant in the Dutch army in 1889. He would continue in active service until 1901, and gradually rose in rank until he attained the rank of lieutenant general of infantry in 1930.

While Duymaer van Twist was stationed in Gouda in the 1890s, he became politically active, engaging in public debates with liberals for the Anti-Revolutionary Party (ARP). In 1897, he was chosen by the local Anti-Revolutionary electoral association to run as the ARP candidate in the electoral district of Gouda, but was narrowly defeated by Carel Jan Emilius van Bylandt. On 24 July 1903, he married Neeltje Dortland, a marriage which remained childless.

== Political career ==
In the 1901 Dutch general election, Duymaer van Twist was first elected to the House of Representatives for the ARP in the district of Steenwijk. As an MP, he focused on military affairs and fisheries. Duymaer van Twist was a member of the orthodox Reformed Gereformeerde Bond, and represented the conservative wing of the Anti-Revolutionary Party. He was a staunch supporter of Abraham Kuyper and his ideology, despite their religious disagreements, accepting an order from Kuyper. In 1917, he co-founded the League against Swearing.

In 1910, Duymaer van Twist was considered for the position of minister of defence, but ultimately was passed up. Following the Red Week in 1918, he had ten armed artillery officers placed in the public gallery of the House of Representatives. He led efforts to establish the Bijzondere Vrijwillige Landstorm in May 1919, an organisation made up of conscripts and reservists, meant to protect the established order in case of internal unrest. A strong supporter of the Dutch monarchy, Duymaer van Twist began the tradition of yelling "Long live the Queen!" after the royal speech on Princes' Day.

Duymaer van Twist was known as a humorous debater, with a loud and booming voice. became known for his public outbursts in parliament. In 1919, after a law establishing the eight-hour work day was passed, in response to MPs of the Social Democratic Workers' Party erupting into song, Duymaer van Twist responded by singing the Dutch national anthem at them. When National Socialist Movement (NSB) parliamentary leader Max de Marchant et d'Ansembourg proclaimed in 1937 that the NSB supported freedom, he interrupted him by loudly coughing.

When he decided not to run for reelection in 1946, Duymaer van Twist was the longest serving member of the House of Representatives, a record that still stands. He was also granted honorary membership of the ARP that same year. Aside from his career as MP, Duymaer van Twist also served in the municipal council of The Hague from 1915 to 1935, and treasurer of the ARP from 1916 to 1940.

Lodewijk Duymaer van Twist died on 7 August 1961 in The Hague.
