= Hooidammer =

Dutch organic cheese brand

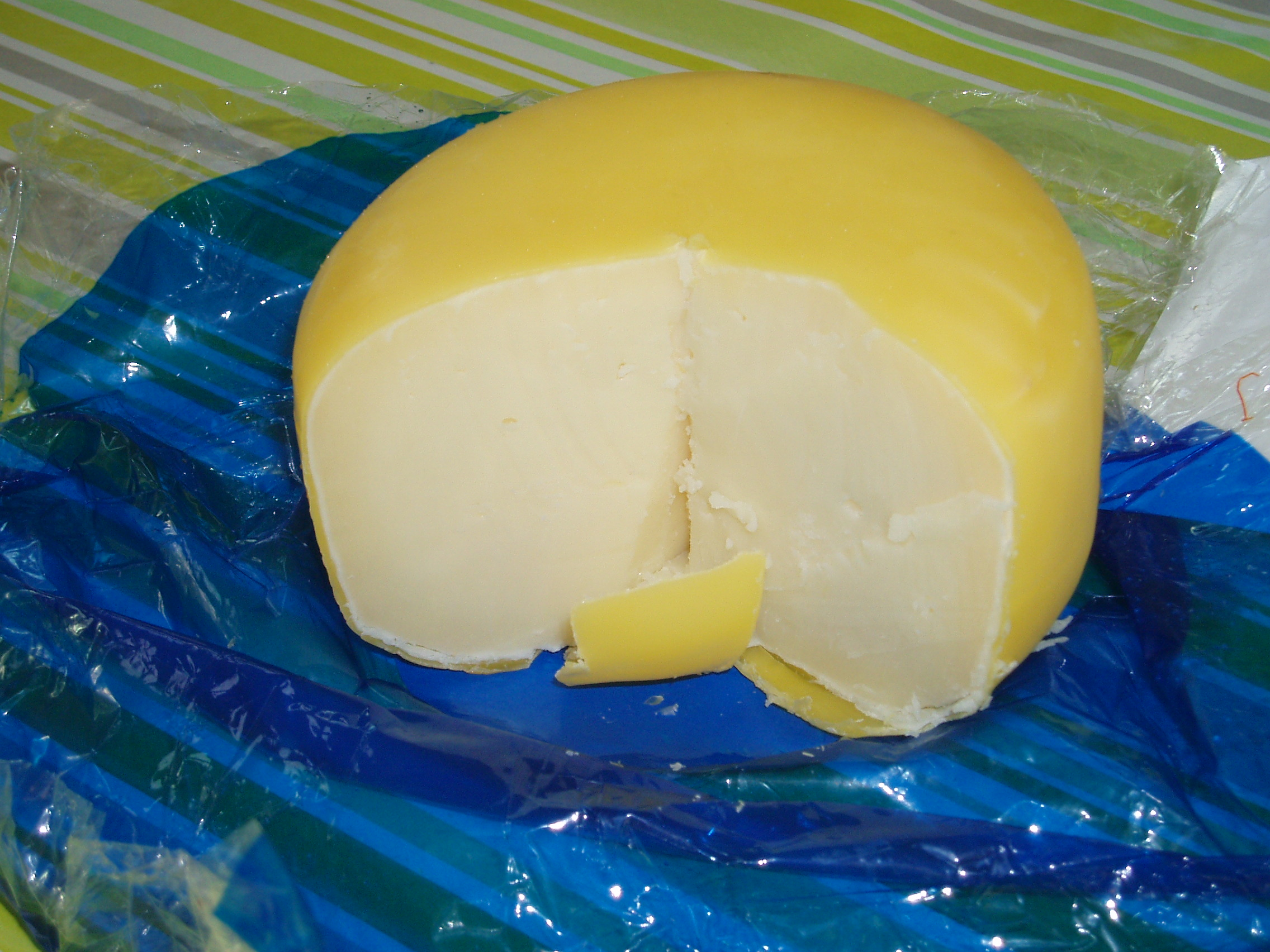
- Hooidammer young sheep's milk cheese
- Country of origin: Netherlands
- Region, town: Heerenveen, Friesland
- Source of milk: Cow, goat and sheep
- Pasteurised: Yes
- Texture: Hard
- Fat content: 50%
- Certification: Organic; some varieties Demeter

Hooidammer is a Dutch brand of organic cheese, produced in Heerenveen, Friesland. The brand began in 1980 at the cheese farm of Jan and Wennie Craens in the Frisian village of Oudega and has been owned by the cheese company Henri Willig since 2000. Cheeses made from cow, goat and sheep milk are sold under the name, mainly through health food shops.

== History ==
=== Origins in Oudega ===
Jan and Wennie Craens, who came from North Brabant, bought an old farmhouse with one and a half hectares of land at Oudega in the late 1970s, because land in their own province was too expensive. Both had previously worked for the environmental foundation De Kleine Aarde in Boxtel. They wanted to run a small dairy making unadulterated products and less common varieties, among them sheep's milk cheese.

Their cows and a flock of Frisian pedigree sheep grazed between Oudega and Eernewoude in an area known as the Hooidam, from which the cheeses took their name. The land, twenty hectares owned by the nature conservation organisation It Fryske Gea, carried ten cows and thirty sheep in 1981, farmed as far as the ground allowed according to biodynamic agriculture. A year later the holding had grown to almost 25 hectares with twenty dairy cows and a flock of Frisian milk sheep, for which rams were bought in East Frisia. The cows were kept in an open shed on straw, no artificial fertiliser was used, and part of the land was leased in the Jan Durks polder. In October 1980 the couple advertised "the first real Hooidammer cheese, made in Oudega" in the village newspaper.

The Craenses made Gouda-style farmhouse cheese from raw milk, without saltpetre, colouring or plastic coating, brined in sea salt and pressed in a wooden vat into cheeses of four kilograms. They also made herb cheeses with celery, thyme, pepper and mustard, garlic, cumin, nettle and clove, and three kinds of sheep's milk cheese: a fresh cheese of drained curd, a semi-hard cheese to an adapted French recipe, and a hard cheese matured for about three months. Wennie Craens made the cheese while Jan Craens sold it two days a week at the markets in Drachten and Groningen; part of the production went to the health food trade. In 1980 the cheeses were added to the cheese board of the Lauswolt hotel and restaurant in Beetsterzwaag.

=== Acquisition by Henri Willig ===
Around 2000 the Craens business, with the De Hooidammer cheese brand, passed to the cheesemaker Henri Willig of Katwoude, who moved production to a new factory in Heerenveen. Jan Craens later started a new artisanal cheese dairy at Veenhuizen.

== Production ==
Hooidammer cheeses are made at the Henri Willig dairy in Heerenveen. The milk comes from organic dairy farmers in the northern Netherlands with whom fixed agreements are made, and the farmers and the dairy meet several times a year. According to the company's anniversary book, Hooidammer works with seventeen organic dairy farmers, most of them in Friesland, and processes about ten million litres of milk a year; the agreements with those farmers cover meadow bird management, fewer mowings and the sowing of flower strips.

All Hooidammer cheeses come from organic farming and carry a vegetarian mark, as they are made with microbial rennet. Sales are aimed mainly at health food shops. The cheeses sold as Hooidammer Demeter are made from cow milk from biodynamic agriculture and carry the Demeter mark.

== Range ==
The range consists of cow, goat and sheep milk cheeses and changes regularly. Cow milk is made into Gouda-style cheeses from young to vintage, alongside herb cheeses with cumin, fenugreek, pesto, nettle and truffle, and a line carrying the Demeter mark. Goat milk is made into young to mature cheeses and herb varieties, and sheep milk into a young cheese and a small baby cheese. The longer matured cheeses are sold as Supreme and can be recognised by their engraved rind.

== Awards ==
Hooidammer cheeses have been awarded at international cheese competitions on several occasions. At the World Cheese Awards the Hooidammer Supreme Cow received a Super Gold in 2023. At the International Cheese Awards in Nantwich the Hooidammer Supreme won gold in the organic hard cheese class in 2019. At the International Cheese & Dairy Awards of 2025 the organic Supreme goat cheese took gold. At the World Championship Cheese Contest in Madison the Hooidammer Bio Supreme Cow and Bio Supreme Goat each took second place in their class in 2026.

== Distribution ==
Hooidammer cheeses are sold in several countries, including Scandinavia, the United States, Belgium and Germany.
