= Had-je-me-maar =

Dutch street performer and political candidate (1856–1931)

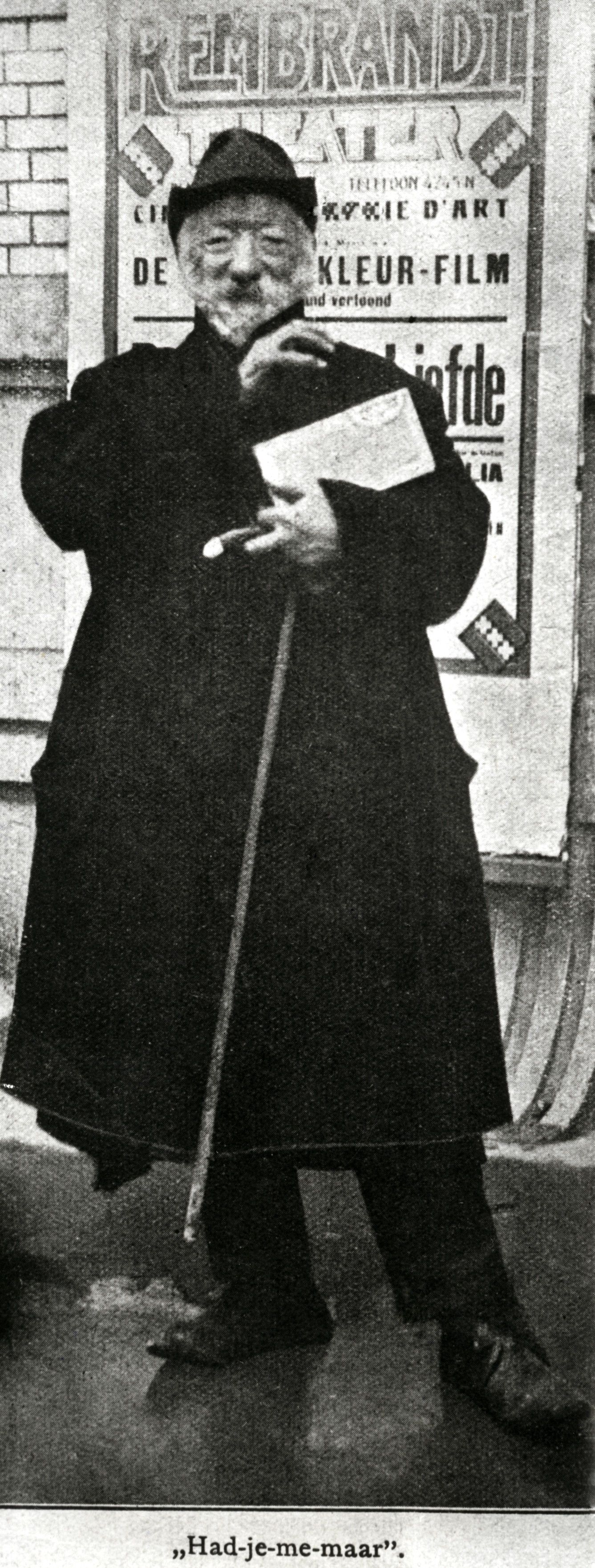
- Had-je-me-maar in 1921
- Born: Cornelis de Gelder; 22 November 1856; Amsterdam, Netherlands
- Died: 30 November 1931 (aged 75); Amsterdam, Netherlands
- Known for: running for office in the 1921 municipal election in Amsterdam, street performing
- Political party: Free Socialist Group; Rapaille Partij
- Other political affiliations: Neutral Party (1918)
- Children: 5

Cornelis "Nelis" de Gelder (22 November 1856 – 30 November 1931), popularly known by his nickname Had-je-me-maar ('If only you had me' in English) was a Dutch homeless person, street performer and political candidate. He became a local celebrity in Amsterdam through his street performances of a 1916 song by Louis Davids, from which he earned his nickname. In 1921, he was picked as the lead candidate for the Free Socialist Group, later the Rapaille Partij, a political party seeking to ridicule the Dutch democratic political system and the electorate by nominating a homeless alcoholic for electoral office. He was successfully elected, though did not take up office.

== Early life ==
Cornelis de Gelder was born on 22 November 1856 in Amsterdam, in the Batavierstraat. Little is known about his early life. De Gelder initially worked as a bricklayer, and later as a pipefitter. De Gelder was arrested for the first time in 1873 and 1874 for stealing a bedsheet and a bottle of liquor, in 1885 he was sentenced to 3 months in prison and a 15 guilders fine for assault.

De Gelder was married three times. His first marriage was to Ludiena Johanna Meijer in 1877, who died shortly after, leaving De Gelder a single father. He remarried a second time to a woman who died in the late 1880s, after which he became responsible for the care of five children. He married another woman in 1889, but that marriage fell apart as well.

Unable to handle the care of his children, De Gelder became homeless and addicted to alcohol. To earn money, he took on various odd jobs, including as a traveling acrobat and performer at local fairs. He would stand in a park in Amsterdam-Noord, where passersby could pay for an attempt to grab a coin out of a bucket filled with electrically-charged water. Later, he found work as an itinerant slipper salesman. From the age of six, De Gelder would take his son to bars where his son was made to perform acrobatic tricks and play the flute for bar patrons.

According to his son, De Gelder was a neglectful parent and an alcoholic of a "vagrant nature", and despite taking his father in for a few months was forced to cut him off after De Gelder had caused disturbances in the neighborhood. His son would later be fired from his job due to the controversy surrounding his father's run for office. De Gelder later spent time in a poorhouse. In 1905, De Gelder was sentenced to 45 days in prison for disorderly conduct, and in 1917 to twelve days in jail for begging. He was frequently convicted for public drunkenness, including six individual times in 1920 alone.

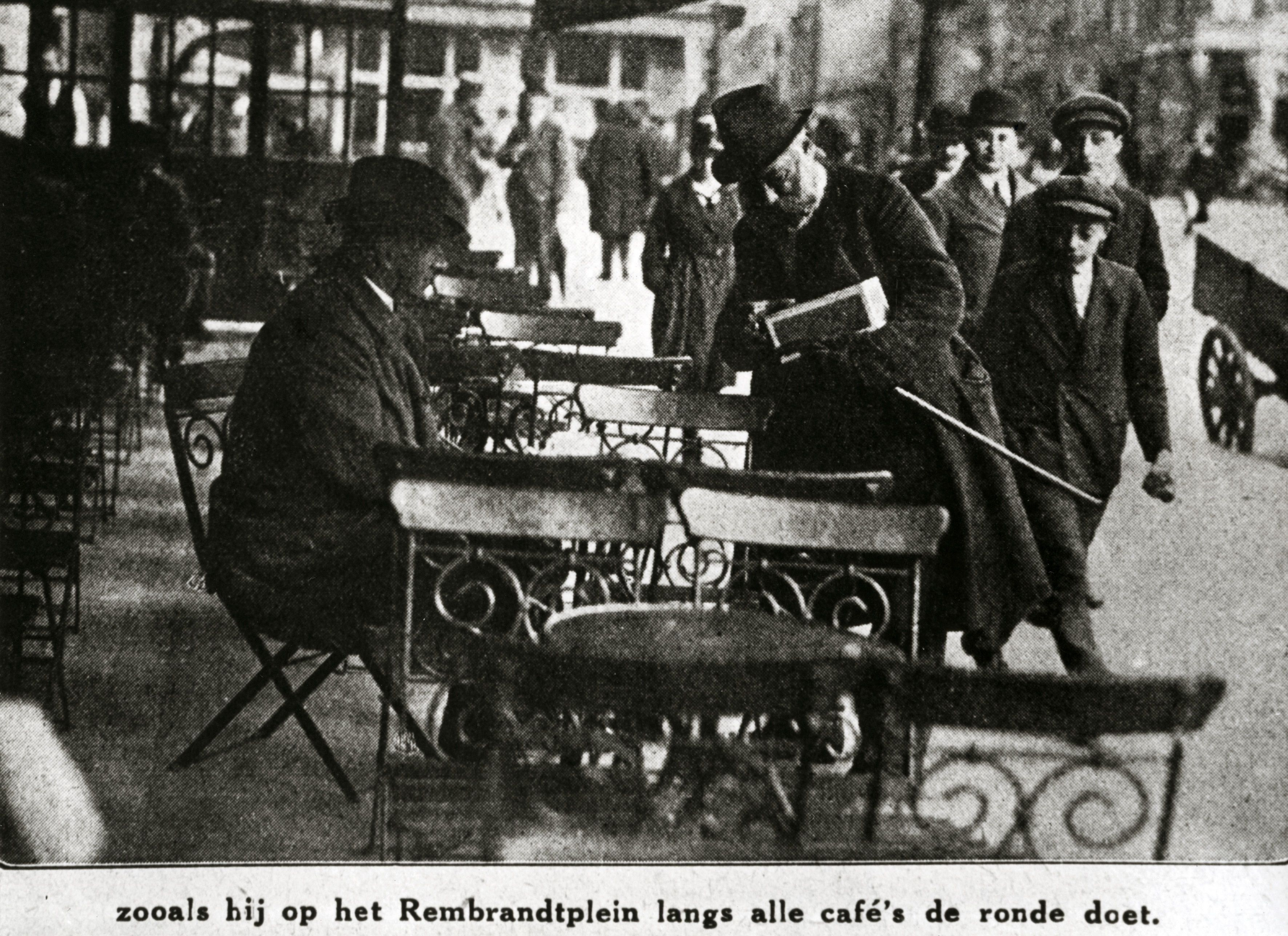
Had-je-me-maar performing for a café patron, ca. 1919

In 1916, the director of the Flora theatre in Amsterdam hired De Gelder to promote a show by Louis Davids titled Had je me maar by singing the eponymous song in public, which earned him his nickname. During this period, Had-je-me-maar frequented the Rembrandtplein, where he would gain the attention of people by yelling "Hap" or "Hapseitie", then entertaining them by singing and dancing the Charleston. He carried a wooden cigar box, in which he kept goods to sell including pencils, condoms and razor blades. Although Had-je-me-maar had access to shelter, he was known to spend his money on alcohol and spend the night sleeping on the streets. He became a local celebrity, being granted a largely sympathetic interview in the weekly De Amsterdammer in 1919, and when Had-je-me-maar dislocated his knee in October that year several newspapers reported on the incident to reassure the public about his well-being. Historian Robin te Slaa characterizes Had-je-me-maar's life during this period as "misery hiding behind the facade of a cheerful hobo", being described by a contemporary journalist as a "drunken old slob" who refused shelter, sleeping in city parks, and appeared physically disheveled, covered in skin rashes and lice.

== Political career ==
Had-je-me-maar first entered politics during the 1918 Dutch general election, when he became involved in the electoral campaign of the Neutral Party led by Henri ter Hall performing various minor tasks.

In February 1921, a group of anarchists in Amsterdam led by Gerhard Rijnders, a protégé of Ferdinand Domela Nieuwenhuis and editor of the newspaper De Vrije Socialist, decided to repudiate the long-standing anarchist refusal to participate in electoral politics by nominating a slate of candidates for that year's local elections by nominating a "ridiculous candidate" to protest compulsory voting and the electoral system in general. After rejecting a proposal to nominate two anarchist dockworkers, on 16 February 1921 an article in De Vrije Socialist by Rijnders first proposed nominating Had-je-me-maar as a candidate, though the plan faced severe criticism from other leftists and anarchists.

The driving force behind Had-je-me-maar's candidature however came from the Artists' Society 'The Others', led by abstract artist Erich Wichman, along with fellow artist Jan Havermans and anarchists Anton Bakels and Henk Eikeboom. They gathered together a broad front of anarchists, Dadaists and other like-minded groups to nominate Had-je-me-maar and anarchist street politician Bertus Zuurbier for the Amsterdam municipal council on 15 March 1921. Wichman, who would later become one of the first Dutch fascists, sought to use Had-je-me-maar's campaign to prove in his eyes the incompetence of the electorate and the failure of democracy as a whole.

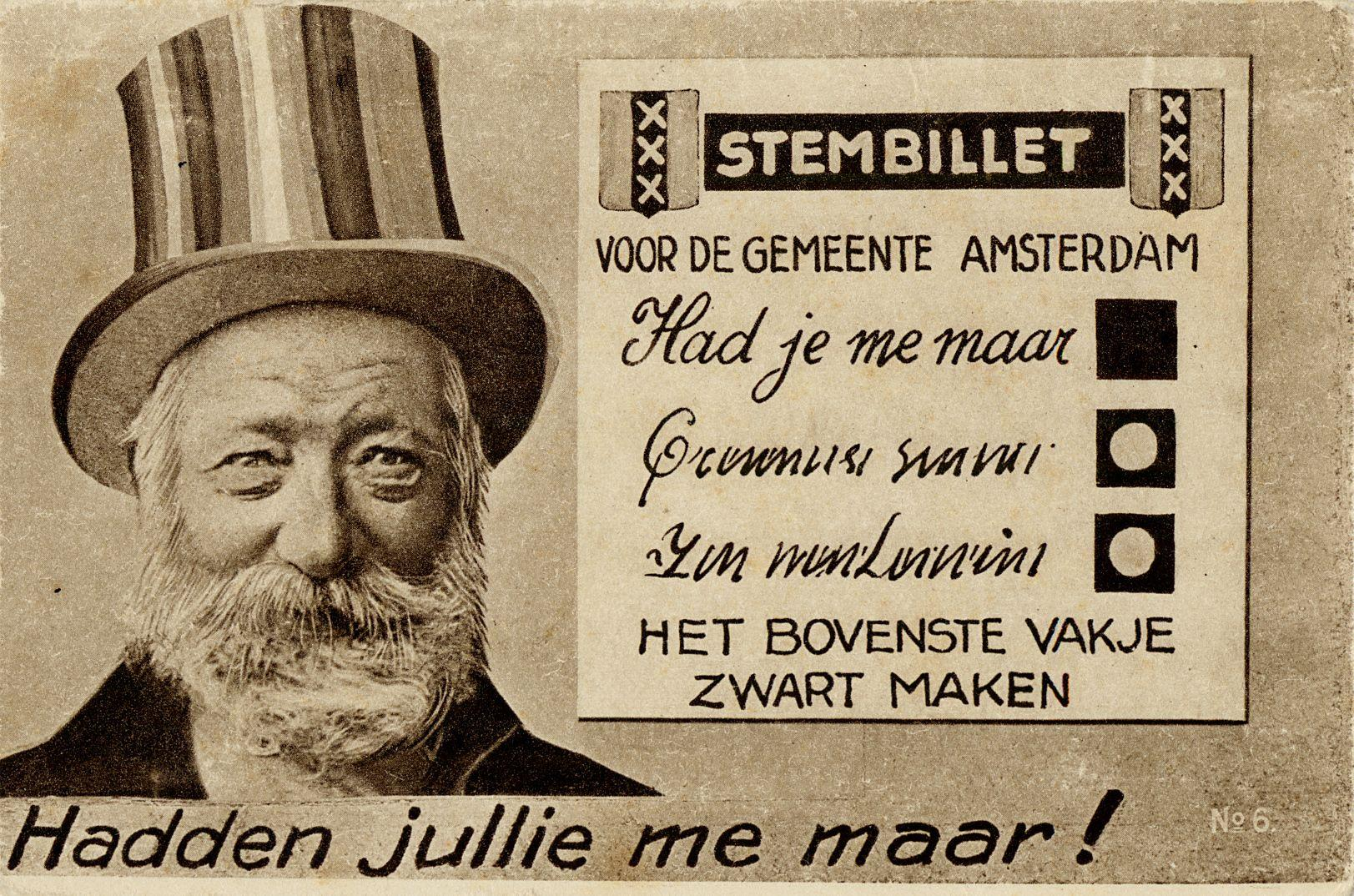
Election advertisement for Had-je-me-maar, 1921

After causing a media frenzy during the registration of his candidacy at Amsterdam city hall, Had-je-me-maar laid out his political platform, which called for lowering the price of gin to five cents per drink, lowering the prices of bread and fat and removing a public urinal from the Rembrandtplein.

Had-je-me-maar's campaign became the source of much discussion in the media, with newspapers from across the political spectrum regarding his candidacy as a joke or an anarchist or Dadaist provocation. He was frequently followed around by mobs of people, which in at least one case caused him so much distress he asked the police to take him into a police station. A campaign film was recorded, titled De droom van Hadt-je-me-maar (Hadt-je-me-maar's dream), and filmed in eight hours. During the film's premiere, Had-je-me-maar aroused more controversy by throwing a cup of unsatisfactory coffee on the floor, drinking from his hip flask, and then leaving.

According to several writers, Had-je-me-maar had to be placed under permanent guard due to his alcoholism, but according to Te Slaa Anton Bakels later stated this story had been fabricated. Had-je-me-maar was arrested several times during the campaign, including on 7 April, after which he spent time in a quarantine facility to be deloused and was freed on 9 April. He was arrested again on 26 April, and on 27 April, Had-je-me-maar was sentenced to 28 days in jail due to "repeated public drunkenness". That same day, the Free Socialist Group won 5.2% of the vote in the local election, which earned Had-je-me-maar and Bertus Zuurbier seats in the Amsterdam municipal council.

Throughout his campaign, bureaucrats within the municipality of Amsterdam had been planning how to stop Had-je-me-maar from entering office. In a letter from 9 April to an Amsterdam municipal offiial the secretary-general at the ministry of foreign affairs Jan Kan wrote that a "Had-je-me-maar law" was being prepared for submittal to the House of Representatives in case he was elected. The day after the Amsterdam municipal election, prime minister Charles Ruijs de Beerenbrouck submitted a proposal to the House of Representatives banning people who "had their right to vote taken away on account of their behaviour", including those convicted of vagrancy and public drunkenness, of being elected to public office. Although Ruijs de Beerenbrouck's initial proposal stalled, it was eventually passed became law in late 1921. A journalist at De Telegraaf wrote Had-je-me-maar had been offered 2000 guilders by "influential Amsterdam council circles" to give up his seat, which he had refused.

On 30 April, the Algemeen Handelsblad announced that Wichman and Bakels, who considered themselves the driving force behind Had-je-me-maar's campaign and Henk Eikeboom had founded the Rapaille Partij. After Had-je-me-maar was freed from jail, he was offered five guilders per night by a promoter to perform as a speaker and public curiosity. After he was turned away from a cafe in Rotterdam on 23 May, Had-je-me-maar gave a performance in a theater in The Hague that same night which ended in a public fight and which was described by a newspaper as a "disgusting display." His career in theater ended due to being taken to the police station in Rotterdam on 26 May and the total refusal of other variety performers to work with him, though Had-je-me-maar refused to return to Amsterdam due to his relative anonymity in Rotterdam.

On 27 May, Had-je-me-maar was arrested again after a drunken cafe performance, and was taken to fhe Amsterdam jail the next day. While in custody on 30 May, Had-je-me-maar signed a form indicating his refusal to accept his election to the Amsterdam municipal council. Due to his illiteracy and opposition from the political establishment, some historians have proposed that Had-je-me-maar was forced to give up his seat under duress, though no direct primary evidence for this exists. Historian Robin Te Slaa also doubts this, arguing that Had-je-me-maar's choice was because of the public ridicule he received as candidate. Because besides him and Bertus Zuurbier no other people had been placed on the candidate list, Had-je-me-maar's seat could not be filled.

== Later life ==
After giving up his council seat, Had-je-me-maar underwent treatment in a rehabilitation clinic in Veenhuizen. He returned to Amsterdam 18 months later, according to newspapers in a sober and well-dressed state, and restarted his previous career as a street salesman. The municipality of Amsterdam provided Had-je-me-maar with housing, sent him money, and kept him under medical supervision. As late as 1928, Had-je-me-maar was still visiting various fairgrounds around North Holland. In late November 1931 Had-je-me-maar was hit by a car while crossing the street at the Leidse Hout park, and died of his wounds in the hospital on 31 November 1931.

In the decades after his run for office, the example of Had-je-me-maar and the Rapaille Partij became used as a warning about new political parties by the media and established political parties. The term "Hadjememaar" became a synonym in the Netherlands for unseriousness and vulgarity in politics.

== Bibliography ==
- Slaa, Robin te (2024). De Rapaille partijen: antipolitieke sentimenten 1918-1931. Amsterdam: Boom. ISBN 978-90-244-6422-7.
- Vossen, Koen (2003). Vrij vissen in het Vondelpark: kleine politieke partijen in Nederland 1918 - 1940. Amsterdam: Wereldbibliotheek. ISBN 978-90-284-2009-0.
