= Neutral Party =

Former political party in the Netherlands

The Neutral Party (Dutch: Neutrale Partij, NP) was a Dutch political party founded in 1918 representing artists' interests. It played only a marginal role in Dutch politics.

== History ==
The NP was founded on 14 February 1918 by Henri ter Hall, a well-known revue artist, who gained fame through his eccentric methods of campaigning. He organised a traveling revue act, titled "Go Ahead and Squeeze!" ("Knijpen maar!"), in which he inveighed against particularist politicians not acting in the public interest and the increasing tax burden, covered large cities in posters of a winking Ter Hall and colourful signage, and enlisted the homeless Hadjememaar, who would be elected to the city council for the Rapaille Partij several years later, as campaign staff in Amsterdam. These methods were novel for its time, but led its opponents to accuse the party of being merely a promotion vehicle for Ter Hall.

The 1918 elections were the first in the Netherlands to use a system of proportional representation. With about 7,000 votes (0,53% of the votes) the NP won one seat, as did several other one or two-person parties. After the elections, the election law became more restrictive. After the elections the NP initiated the formation of a neutral parliamentary group, which united several ones and two-person parties, namely the Neutral Party, Peasants' League, the Economic League, the Middle Class Party and the Alliance to Democratise the Forces. The parliamentary party was led by the former minister Willem Treub. In 1921 several of these parties, including the Neutral Party, merged into the Liberal State Party ("the Freedom League"), together with two larger liberal parties. Until 1929 the party was an independent part in the Liberal State Party, campaigning with its own list.

== Ideology and issues ==
The NP was a typical special-interest party. Its main goal was to represent the interests of artists and people employed in the entertainment sector. Economically, the party opposed higher taxes. In all other questions it sought to supersede partisan and group interests and act in the general interest.

== Leadership and support ==
This table shows the NP's results in elections to the House of Representatives and Senate, as well as the party's political leadership: the fractievoorzitter, is the chair of the parliamentary party and the lijsttrekker is the party's top candidate in the general election, these posts are normally taken by the party's leader.

Year	HoR	S	Lijsttrekker	Fractievoorzitter
1918	1	0	Henri ter Hall	Henri ter Hall
1919	1	0	no elections	Henri ter Hall
1920	1	0	no elections	Henri ter Hall

== Electorate ==
The party drew most of its support from voters who were not aligned with any of the major pillars.
