= Henri Willig =

Dutch cheese company

Kaasmakerij Henri Willig
- Founders Henri and Riet Willig
- Trade name: Henri Willig
- Type: Private company (besloten vennootschap)
- Industry: Dairy
- Founded: 1974; Katwoude, Netherlands
- Founders: Henri and Riet Willig
- Headquarters: Katwoude, Netherlands
- Key people: Wiebe Willig (managing director)
- Products: Cheese
- Revenue: €83 million (2023)
- Number of employees: over 500 (2026)
- Website: henriwillig.com

Henri Willig, formally Kaasmakerij Henri Willig, is a Dutch cheese company based in Katwoude in the municipality of Waterland, North Holland. It was founded in 1974 by Henri Willig and his wife Riet, who took over his parents' farm and began making cheese there. The company produces cheese in Katwoude and Heerenveen and sells it through its own shops, trading as Cheese & More by Henri Willig, in the Netherlands, Germany and Austria.

During the 1980s Willig also built up a goat farm with a cheese dairy near Lelystad, the Nationaal Geitencentrum. From 1990 the company processed goat milk from farmers in Friesland and Groningen and exported cheese to Germany, France and the United States, among other countries. From 2010 it opened cheese shops in city centres and from 2018 abroad; thirteen of them are in Amsterdam. Revenue was €83 million in 2023, and in 2026 the company had more than five hundred employees.

== History ==
=== Foundation ===
Cheese had been made by the Willig family at Hoogedijk 8 in Katwoude since the 1930s, when Henri Willig's grandfather Martien produced Gouda-style cheese there. Henri Willig grew up in Katwoude on his father's dairy farm, the only son in a family of five children. When the Kout family in Edam decided to wind down sales at their cheese farm, he was asked whether he wanted to take over their customers. He and his wife Riet took a cheesemaking course, and in the spring of 1974 they registered the business with the chamber of commerce. They started with 25 cows, and Willig initially made the cheeses himself. According to the company's anniversary book, the first group of tourists arrived on 3 March 1975, sent on by the Kout family, and four years later the farm received 120,000 visitors a year.

The cheese farm soon attracted coaches carrying tourists. In 1983 the farm, on the tourist route to Volendam, received some 180,000 visitors a year. After building a new barn for two hundred cows, Willig bought a herd of a hundred goats in 1979 and housed them in the old cowshed. He then began making goat cheese as well. According to De Telegraaf he was the first to bring a Gouda-style cheese made from goat milk to market. In 1984 the Katwoude business covered 30 hectares with 150 cows, and Willig employed fifteen people.

=== Fire in 1985 ===
On 18 April 1985 a fire destroyed most of the cheese farm. The dairy and the shop were lost and the farmhouse was badly damaged; the damage was estimated at almost four million guilders. Police said the fire had started at the rear of the dairy; the cause was not known at the time. The company's anniversary book attributes it to welding work in the former cowshed; no one was injured. Nine days later a temporary shop opened in a neighbour's stable; the new building was completed in May 1986 and production had fully resumed by the spring of 1987.

=== Nationaal Geitencentrum ===
In 1983 Willig built the Nationaal Geitencentrum on 32 hectares in the 't Gelderse Hout forestry near Lelystad. He invested about one million guilders in it. Like the Katwoude business, the centre was to combine livestock farming, a cheese dairy and a tourist attraction. In preparation Willig attended an international goat congress in the United States and visited goat farms near San Francisco and in France.

Shortly before the opening, in March 1984, a Chinese agricultural delegation led by vice-minister Xiang Chongyang visited the centre, which then had 440 goats. Minister of Agriculture Gerrit Braks opened the centre officially later that year, when it had five hundred goats. Willig was a member of an association of some forty commercially operating goat farmers founded in 1983.

In 1986 the centre kept five hundred dairy goats and collected milk from fifty goat farmers, 30,000 to 35,000 litres a week in total. Half of this was processed into curd for the French market and the rest into hard cheese to a Gouda recipe. Willig developed a spreadable cheese made from melted goat cheese, which was sold under his name.

=== Growth in the 1980s and 1990s ===
The Katwoude dairy, which specialised in small cheeses, employed fourteen people in 1988. Unable to find experienced cheesemakers in its own region, the company recruited staff in Friesland.

In 1989 the goat farmers' cooperative in Leek contracted Kaasmakerij Henri Willig BV to process half of its milk: at least 800,000 kilograms from 1 January 1990. For 1991 this came to about one million kilograms. The Leeuwarder Courant described the company in 1989 as a farmhouse cheesemaker that had grown into a small dairy industry, making mainly small cow and goat milk cheeses for tourists and for corporate gifts. It then employed fifteen people, half of them from Friesland.

Around 1990 Willig sold the goat cheese that his own company and the dairy firm De Zuid-Oost-Hoek in Oosterwolde made from this milk. Together the two produced about 200 tonnes, a third of Dutch goat cheese production. The cheese went mainly to West Germany, France, Spain and Belgium; in the United States it was sold under the brand name Silver Skates. Because demand exceeded the supply of milk in 1993, the company paid goat farmers who increased production a premium on the milk price.

In 1994 the dairy made about 85 tonnes of kosher cheese a year, more than ninety per cent of which was exported, to England, Belgium and Israel among other countries. Since Passover 1994 its Baby Gouda, a cheese weighing under half a kilogram, could carry the designations Halav Israel and Super Kosher, which refer to milk obtained under rabbinical supervision.

=== Zaanse Schans ===
As the Katwoude farm could no longer handle the number of visitors, two further cheese farms were added in the early 1990s: the Alida Hoeve in Volendam in 1990 and the cheese dairy at the Zaanse Schans in 1992. The farm at the Zaanse Schans, called the Catharina Hoeve, is a replica of a traditional farmhouse where cheesemaking is demonstrated in ten languages. In 2019 the company provided sixty full-time jobs there. Henri Willig chaired the Zaanse Schans entrepreneurs' association.

=== Heerenveen and the second generation ===
In 2003 the company opened a second cheese dairy in Heerenveen, after expansion in Katwoude proved impossible; the construction overran in both time and budget. His middle son Wiebe Willig, who had worked at the consultancy Accenture, joined the company in that period to put its finances in order. Wiebe Willig took over as managing director from his father in 2011. His brothers Jacob and Martin also work in the company, Jacob in information technology and Martin as finance director. Henri Willig remained involved after the handover and still visits the cheese farm in Katwoude daily.

In 2013 the company invested seven million euros in expanding the Heerenveen dairy. The building grew from 4,800 to 9,000 square metres, with a capacity of 7,000 tonnes of cheese a year. Two years later the Heerenveen dairy had a new warehouse with robots and a fully automated handling line for the cheeses. The company was then processing 55 million litres of milk a year into 6,000 tonnes of cheese, including 1,200 tonnes of goat cheese. About forty per cent was exported; in the Netherlands its customers included Albert Heijn, Lidl and Jumbo.

=== Retail chain ===
The company had an outlet in the Magna Plaza shopping centre in Amsterdam from 1995. In 2009 that outlet and a counter at a tour operator on the Damrak were its only points of sale in the city. When retail space in central Amsterdam became available after the 2008 financial crisis, the company opened its first cheese gift shop in 2010, modelled on the gift shops of the cosmetics chain Rituals. By January 2013 the chain had sixteen shops in North and South Holland, seven of them in central Amsterdam. The range was later brought entirely under the company's own brand and the shops were named Cheese & More by Henri Willig.

According to RTL Nieuws, revenue grew from €47 million in 2013 to €69 million in 2017. At the end of 2019 the company had 23 shops in the Netherlands. At its fiftieth anniversary in 2024 there were 37 outlets in three countries, together receiving 7.5 million visitors a year, thirteen of them in central Amsterdam. In early 2026 the company had 28 shops in the Netherlands and two restaurants, including a grand café in Giethoorn opened in 2023. A branch in 's-Hertogenbosch was closed after three years.

=== International expansion ===
The first shop outside the Netherlands opened in 2018 on the Kärntner Straße in Vienna. A shop on the Marienplatz in Munich followed a year later. Outlets in Salzburg, Cologne, Berlin and Düsseldorf came after that. In 2023 the company opened a shop in Frankfurt, its first in the state of Hesse; it then had 35 shops of its own, seven of them in Germany. Its ninth German outlet opened on the Königstraße in Stuttgart in May 2025 and its tenth in Freiburg im Breisgau in October 2025. The company then had 38 shops in the Netherlands, Germany and Austria.

== Production ==
The company makes cheese in Katwoude and Heerenveen. About 120 Jersey cows are kept at the Jacobs Hoeve, the cheese farm in Katwoude. Most of the milk comes from around forty other dairy farmers. A machine designed by Henri Willig produces 2,400 small cheeses an hour in Katwoude; the large cheeses come from Heerenveen. The dairy farm in Katwoude has been organic since 1999, and since 2015 the cows have been housed in a deep-litter barn. Besides the Henri Willig name the company owns the organic brands Hooidammer, sold through health food shops, and Polderkaas, sold through ordinary retailers. The Hooidammer brand, which originated in 1979 in the Frisian Hooidammen area, was acquired in 2000; about ten million litres of milk from seventeen organic dairy farmers are processed under it each year. In 2015 about seventy per cent of the organic cheese was exported, to Germany and Scandinavia among other markets. In early 2026 the company exported to 45 countries.

== Tourism ==
The company runs cheese farms with shops in Katwoude, Volendam and at the Zaanse Schans. On an ordinary day about twenty coaches visit the Katwoude farm, twice that number in high season. NRC wrote in 2024 that cheesemaking at the company had changed from craft to mass production over fifty years, while the company continued to present its traditional character. In Edam, Henri Willig had two listed buildings restored and fitted out as a cheese museum.

When the municipality of Zaanstad proposed transferring management of the Zaanse Schans to a foundation in 1993, Henri Willig criticised the lack of consultation with residents and businesses. He also opposed plans for an entrance fee, arguing that the site was public ground and that residents of Zaanstad would have to pay to enter their own city. In 2017 the city of Amsterdam decided to allow no new shops aimed at tourists in the city centre. Wiebe Willig said in response that the company was not alarmed, as the city centre was already well supplied with cheese shops. Writing in the Süddeutsche Zeitung in 2019, columnist Thomas Kirchner noted that the new Munich shop would no longer be permitted in Amsterdam under that policy.

== Awards ==
Cheeses from the company have been awarded at international cheese competitions on several occasions. At the World Championship Cheese Contest in Madison the company won four Best of Class awards in 2024, for Smokey Gouda, Smokey BBQ, Smokey Goat and Sublime Sheep, and in 2026 took second place in two classes with the Hooidammer cheeses Bio Supreme Cow and Bio Supreme Goat. At the World Cheese Awards the Hooidammer Supreme Cow received a Super Gold in 2023, alongside silver and bronze awards in 2022, 2023 and 2024. At the International Cheese & Dairy Awards its Smokey Gouda won the John Davidge Perpetual Trophy for best smoked cheese in 2021, and the company took two gold awards in 2025.

Henri Willig was appointed Knight in the Order of Orange-Nassau in April 2022. In January 2026 Wiebe Willig received the municipality of Waterland's Entrepreneur of the Year award for 2025 on behalf of the company.
