= Rapaille Partij =

Political party in the Netherlands

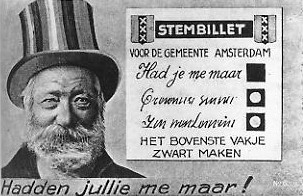
Postal card of the Rapaille Partij with vagabond Hadjememaar

The Vrije Socialistische Groep or Sociaal-Anarchistische Actie in Nederland, nicknamed Rapaille Partij ("Riffraff Party") was a Dutch local political party founded in Amsterdam in the 1920s. Their ideology was strongly against democracy, the parliamentary system and the obligation to vote. In order to ridicule democracy, they tried to have marginal figures elected such as the vagabond and street musician Had-je-me-maar (Cornelis de Gelder) and former anarchist Bertus Zuurbier.

They never succeeded in being voted into Parliament, but they participated successfully in the municipal elections of Amsterdam where they won two seats which were taken by Hadjememaar and Zuurbier. Its platform included free alcoholic beverages for citizens in Amsterdam, the abolition of compulsory voting, and free fishing and hunting in the Vondelpark. However, after the elections the authorities (not coincidentally at a politically opportune moment) arrested Hadjememaar and forced him to follow a detox program. Zuurbier took his seat but it was said that he never participated in discussions. According to minutes of the meeting he actually did participate and ventilated his anarchist beliefs, however his contributions were systematically ignored by the press.

Be it as it may, after a while the party no longer succeeded in raising similar stunts to attract attention. This caused the party to lose popularity, and it soon dissolved.
