= Leidse Hout =

Park in Leiden, Netherlands

Coordinates: 52°10′28″N 4°28′52″E

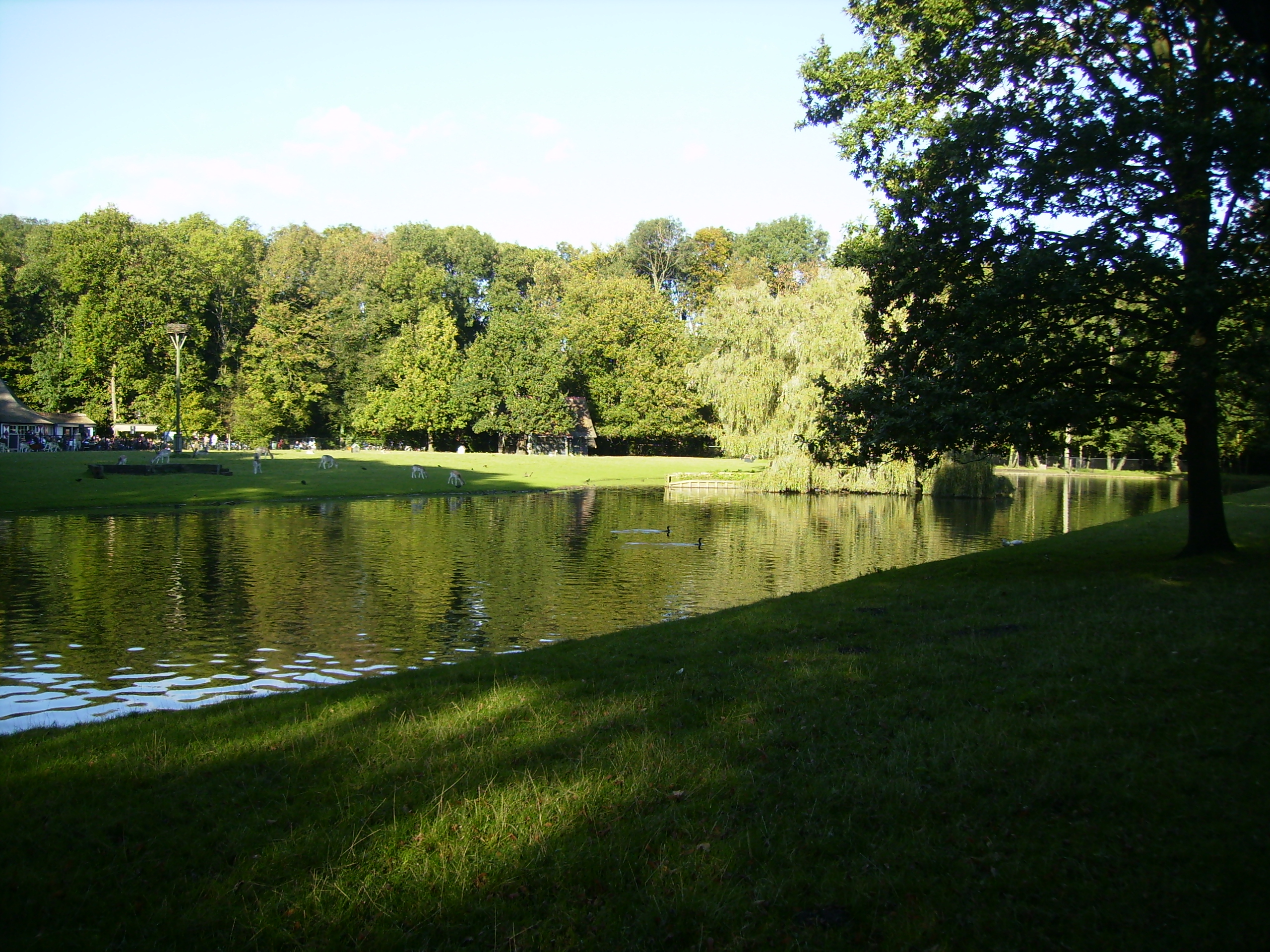
- Leidse Hout deer park and tea house in background
- Interactive map of Leidse Hout
- Type: Urban park
- Location: Leiden, Netherlands
- Created: 1931
- Status: Open all year

The Leidse Hout (English: Leiden Woods) is a public urban park in Leiden, Netherlands. It is located between the border of Oegstgeest, approximately 1.5 kilometers northwest of the Leiden city center, and on the northern border of the Leiden Diaconessenhuis hospital.

The park was opened on June 30, 1931 and was the product of a governmental program that provided work for the unemployed during the Great Depression. A tea house, deer park, and a music pavilion is incorporated into the park. Additionally, there is an adjacent sports park with tennis courts, soccer fields, a track, and a softball field.

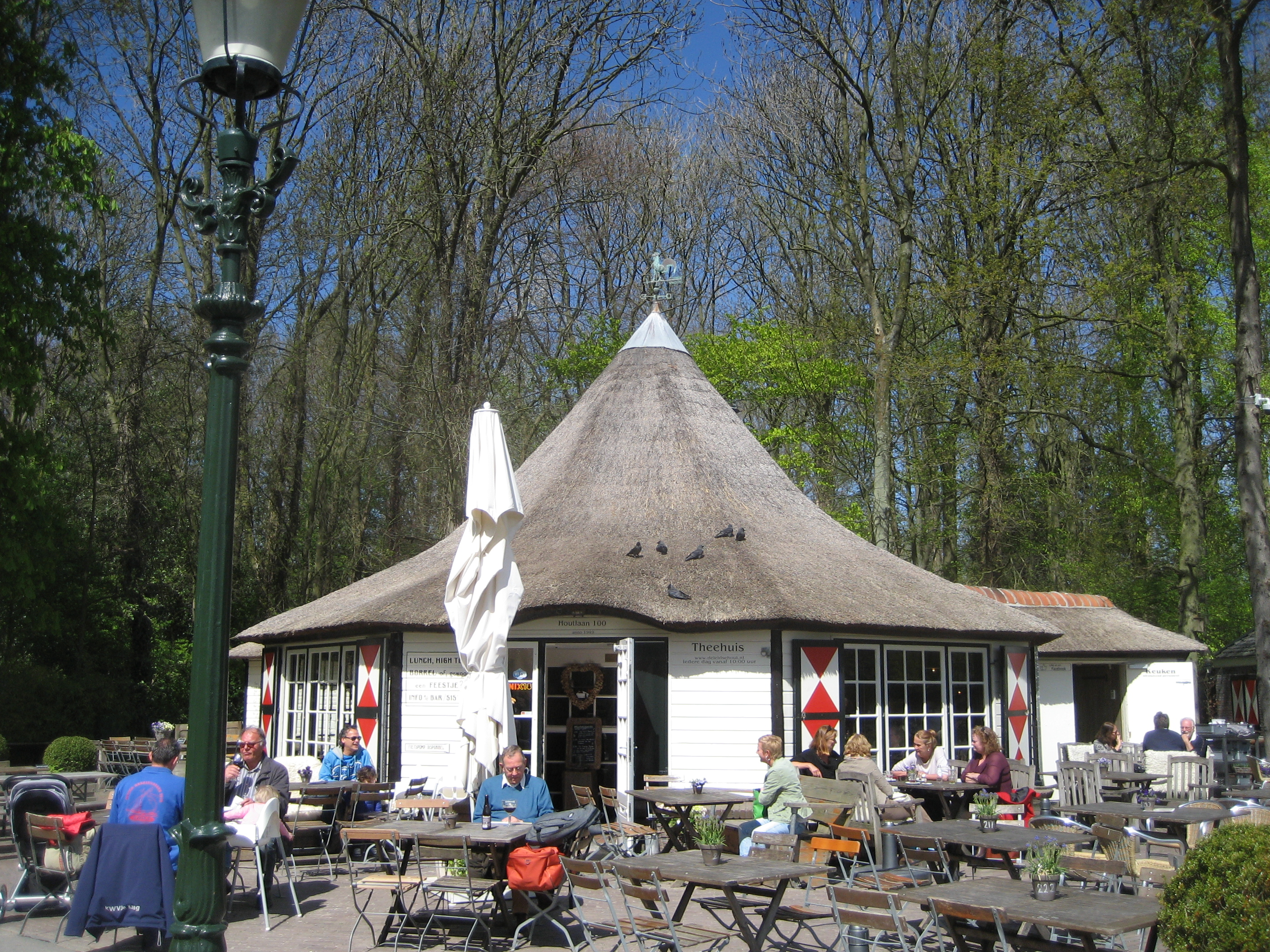
Tea House

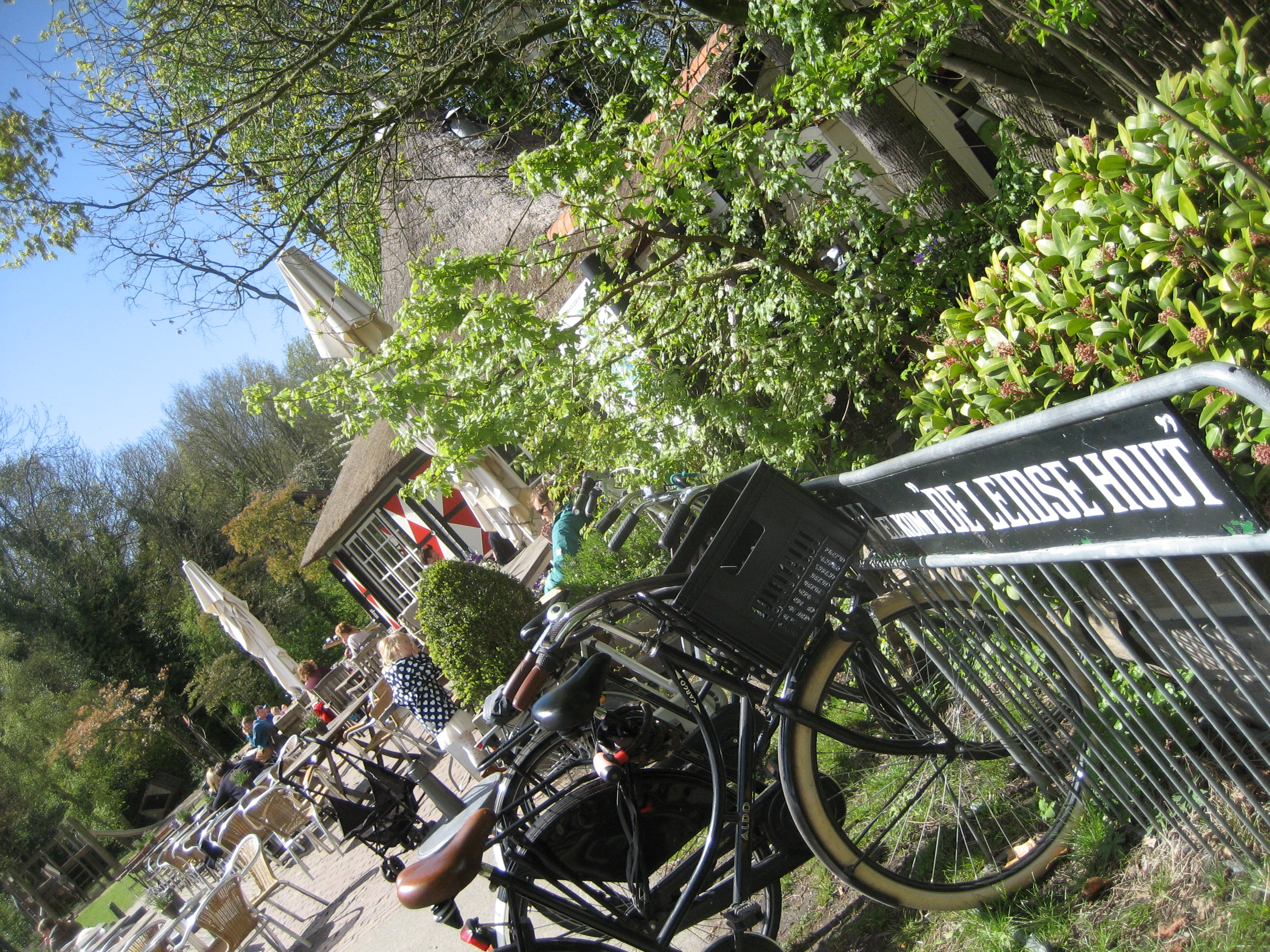

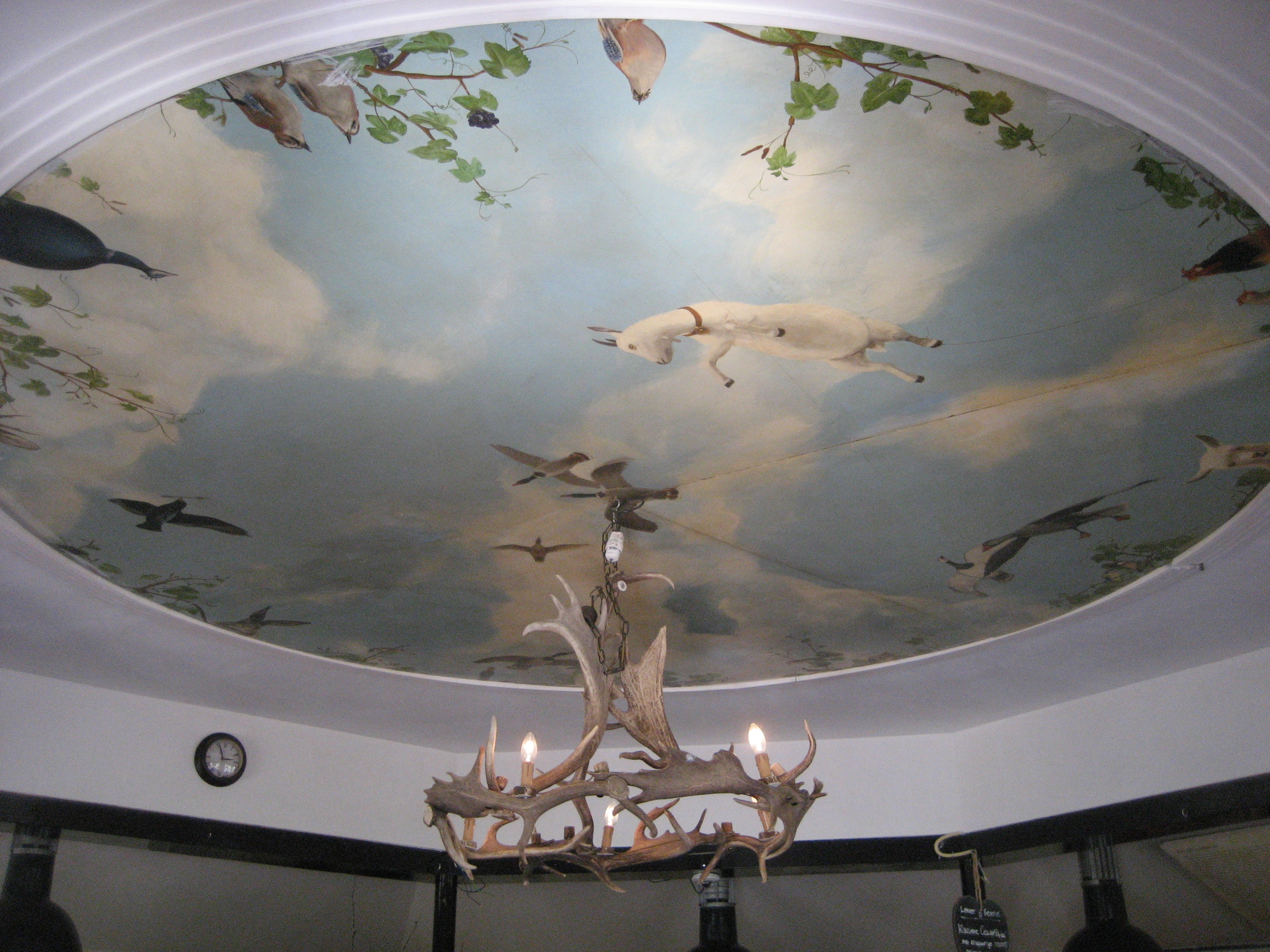
Tea House (ceiling)
