= Katwoude =

- Village
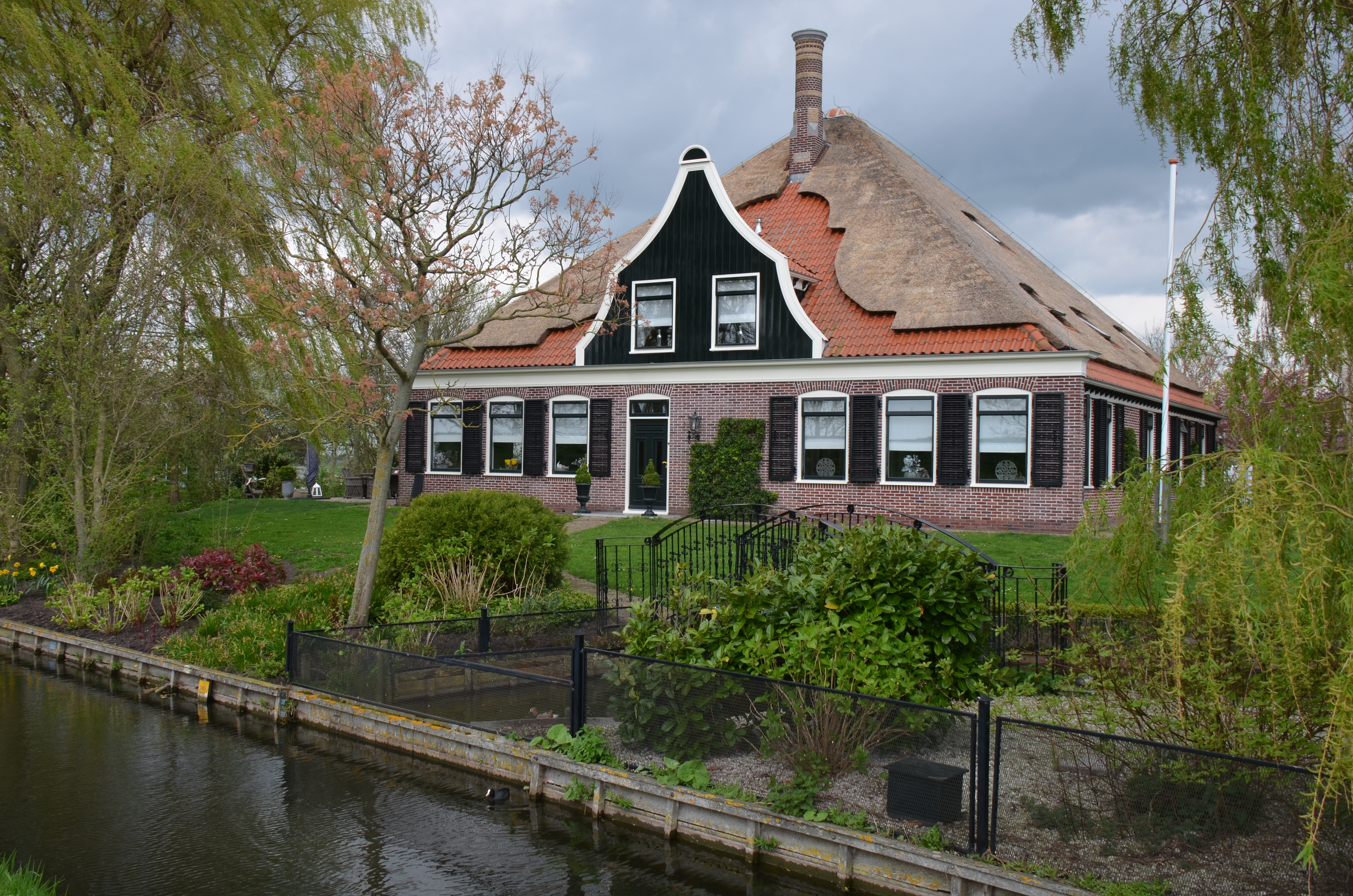

- Coat of arms

- Location in the Netherlands Location in the province of North Holland in the Netherlands
- Coordinates: 52°28′N 5°3′E
- Country: Netherlands
- Province: North Holland
- Municipality: Waterland

Area
  - Total: 7.03 km^{2} (2.71 sq mi)
- Elevation: −1.0 m (−3.3 ft)

Population (2021)
  - Total: 335
  - Density: 47.7/km^{2} (123/sq mi)
- Time zone: UTC+1 (CET)
  - Summer (DST): UTC+2 (CEST)
- Postal code: 1145
- Dialing code: 0299

Katwoude is a village in the province of North Holland, Netherlands. It is a part of the municipality of Waterland, and lies on the coast of the IJsselmeer, about 2 km north of Monnickendam.

The village was first mentioned in 1310 as "lant van Kattwoude". Even though there is a cat in the shield dating from 1566, it is not related to the animal. The name of the village refers to a swamp forest (-woude) that grew on kattige soil. This refers to the poor, lumpy peat soil around Katwoude.

Katwoude was home to 182 people in 1840. It used to be a separate municipality between 1817 and 1991, when it became part of Waterland. Katwoude used to share a mayor with Monnickendam.

The hamlet Zedde is part of Katwoude.

== Gallery ==
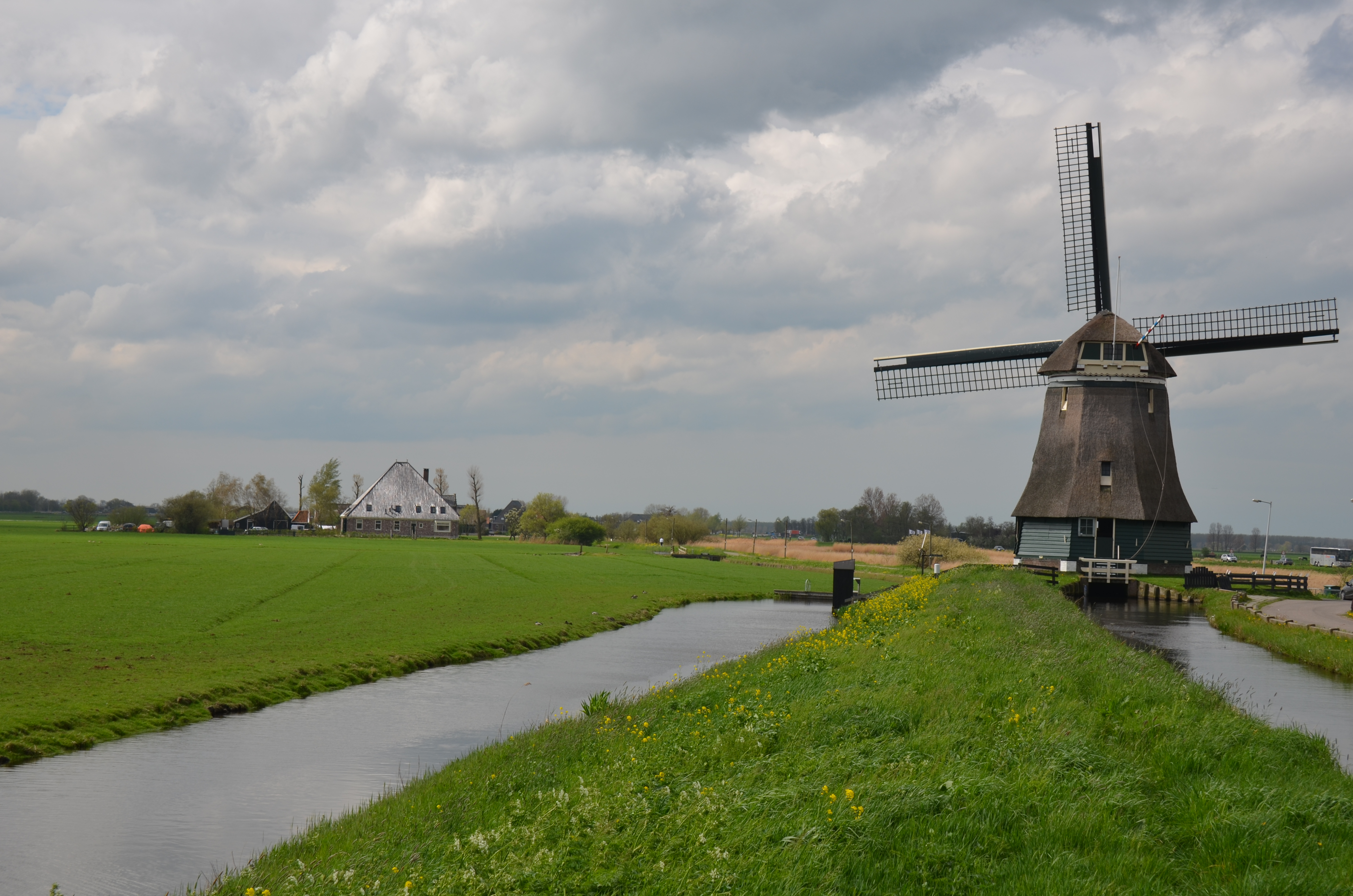
Polder windmill

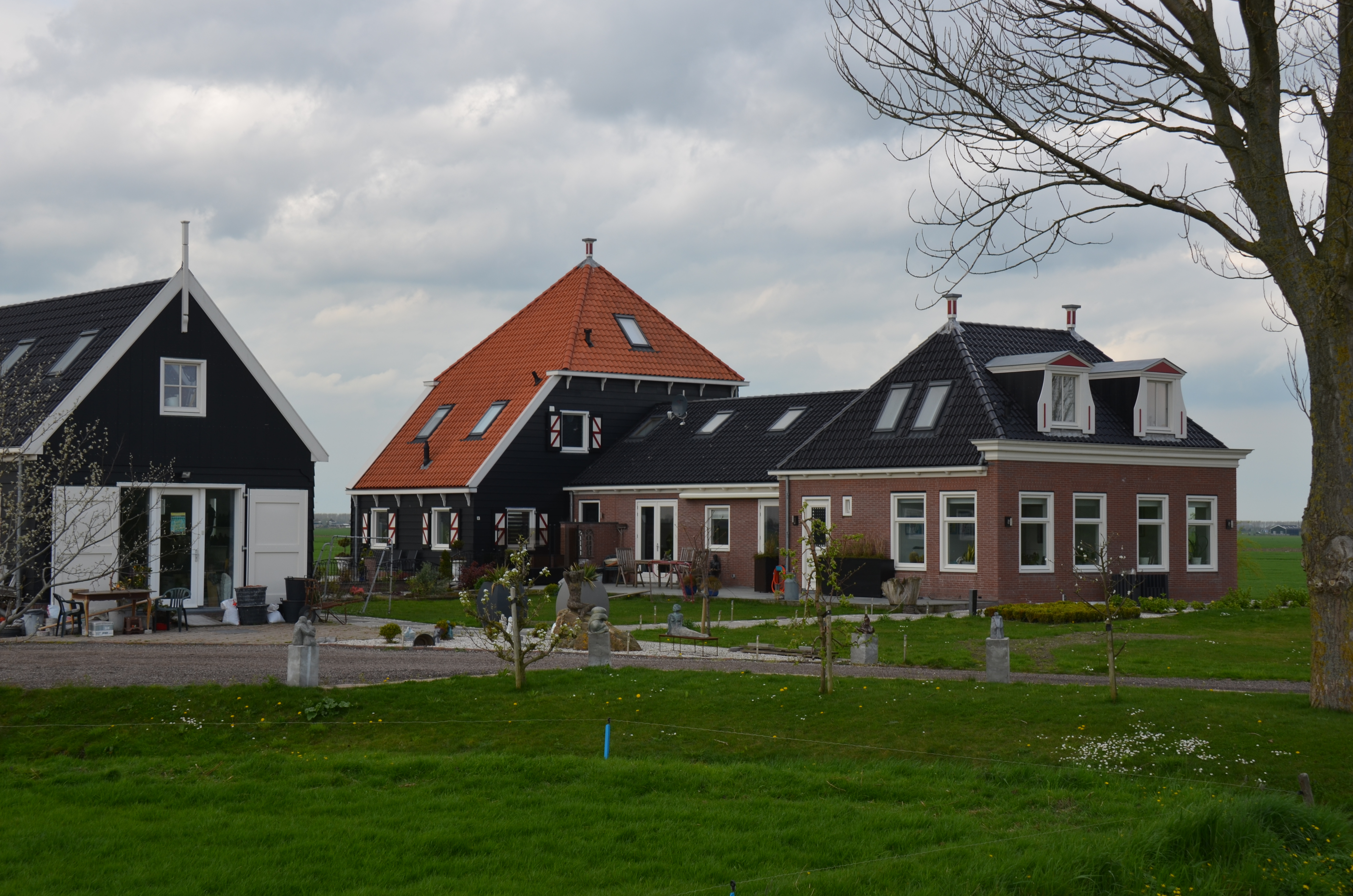
Farm in Katwoude

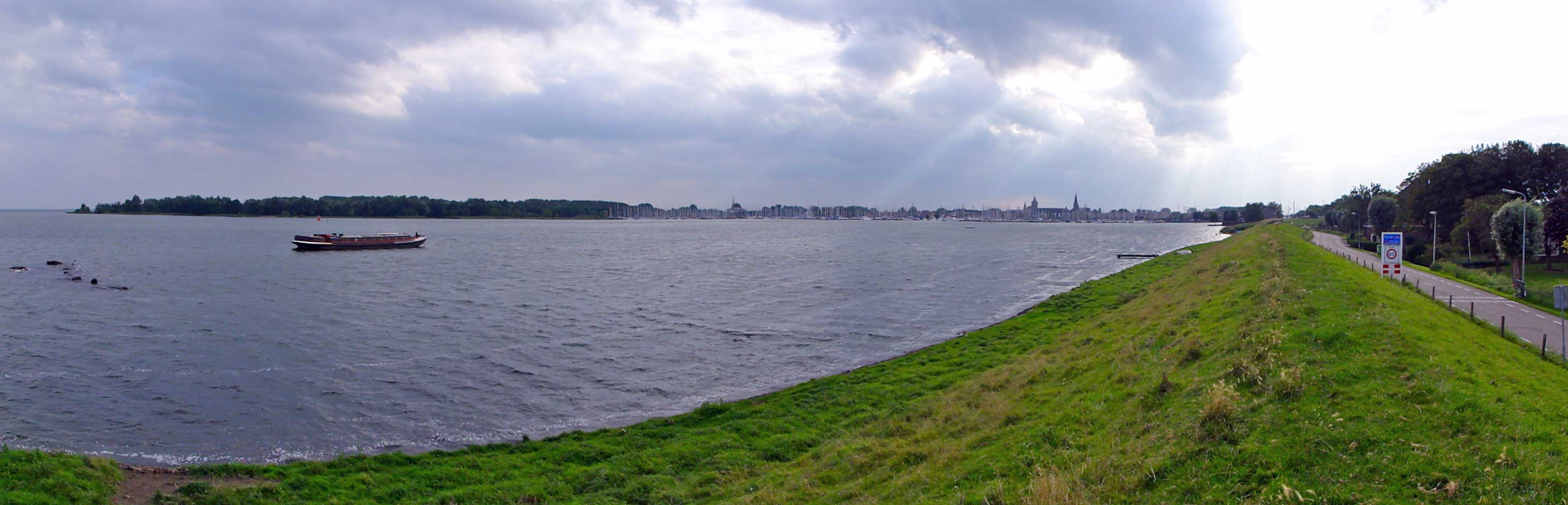
Monnickendam seen from Katwoude

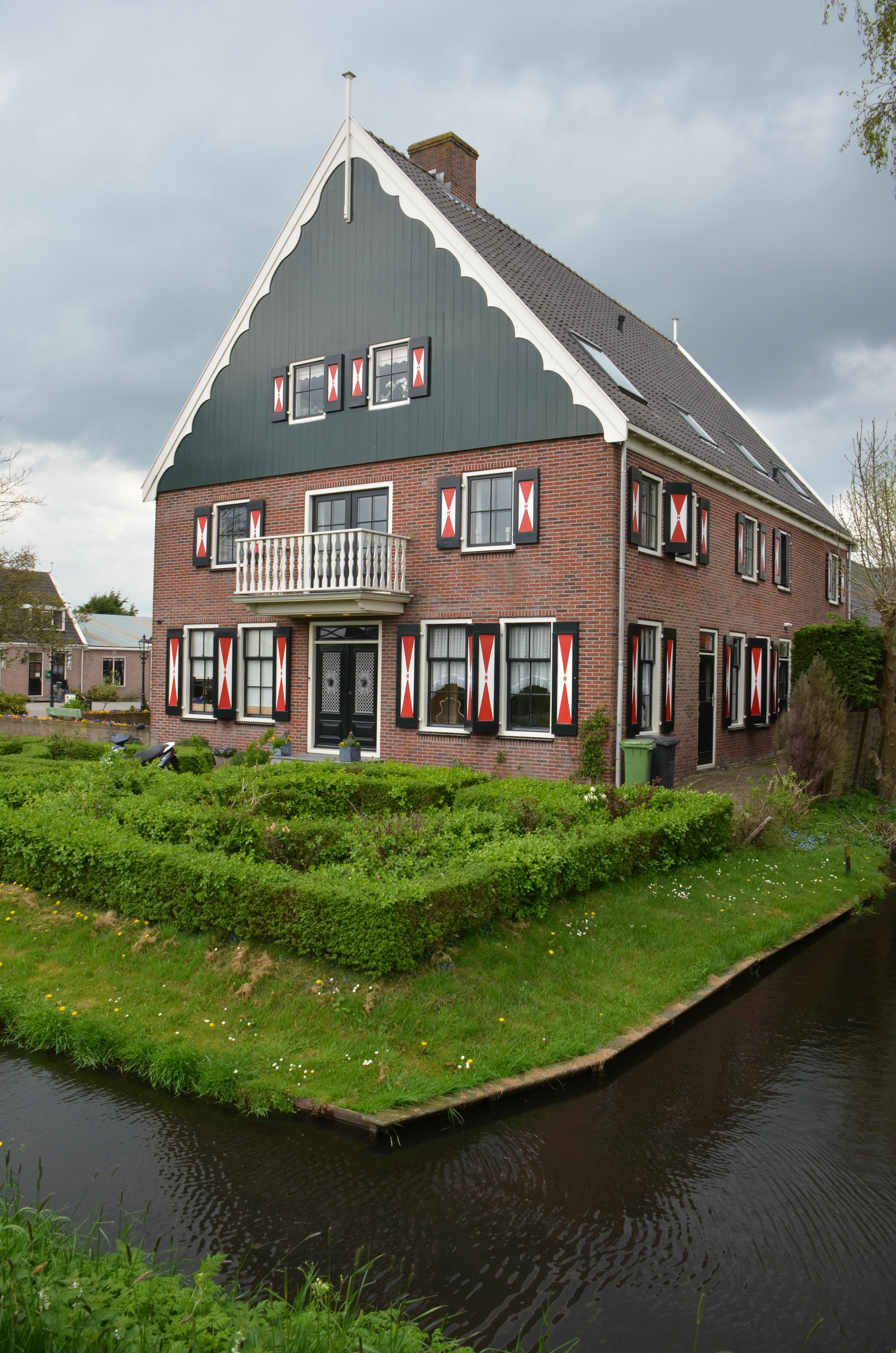
Jacobshoeve cheese factory
