= Veenhuizen =

Veenhuizen may refer to several places:

- Veenhuizen, North Holland
- Veenhuizen, Coevorden in the province of Drenthe
- Veenhuizen, Noordenveld in the province of Drenthe
- Veenhuizen, Menterwolde in the province of Groningen
- Veenhuizen, Stadskanaal in the province of Groningen
