= Mariapolder, Hoeksche Waard =

Mariapolder
- Hamlet
- Location in the province of South Holland in the Netherlands Location in the Netherlands
- Coordinates: 51.7239°N 4.6178°E
- Country: Netherlands
- Province: South Holland
- Municipality: Hoeksche Waard

Mariapolder is a polder and hamlet in the Dutch province of South Holland located near Strijensas and is part of the municipality of Hoeksche Waard.

Mariapolder is not a statistical entity, and considered part of Strijensas. It has a little harbour and World War II bunkers.
