= Maasdam =

- Village
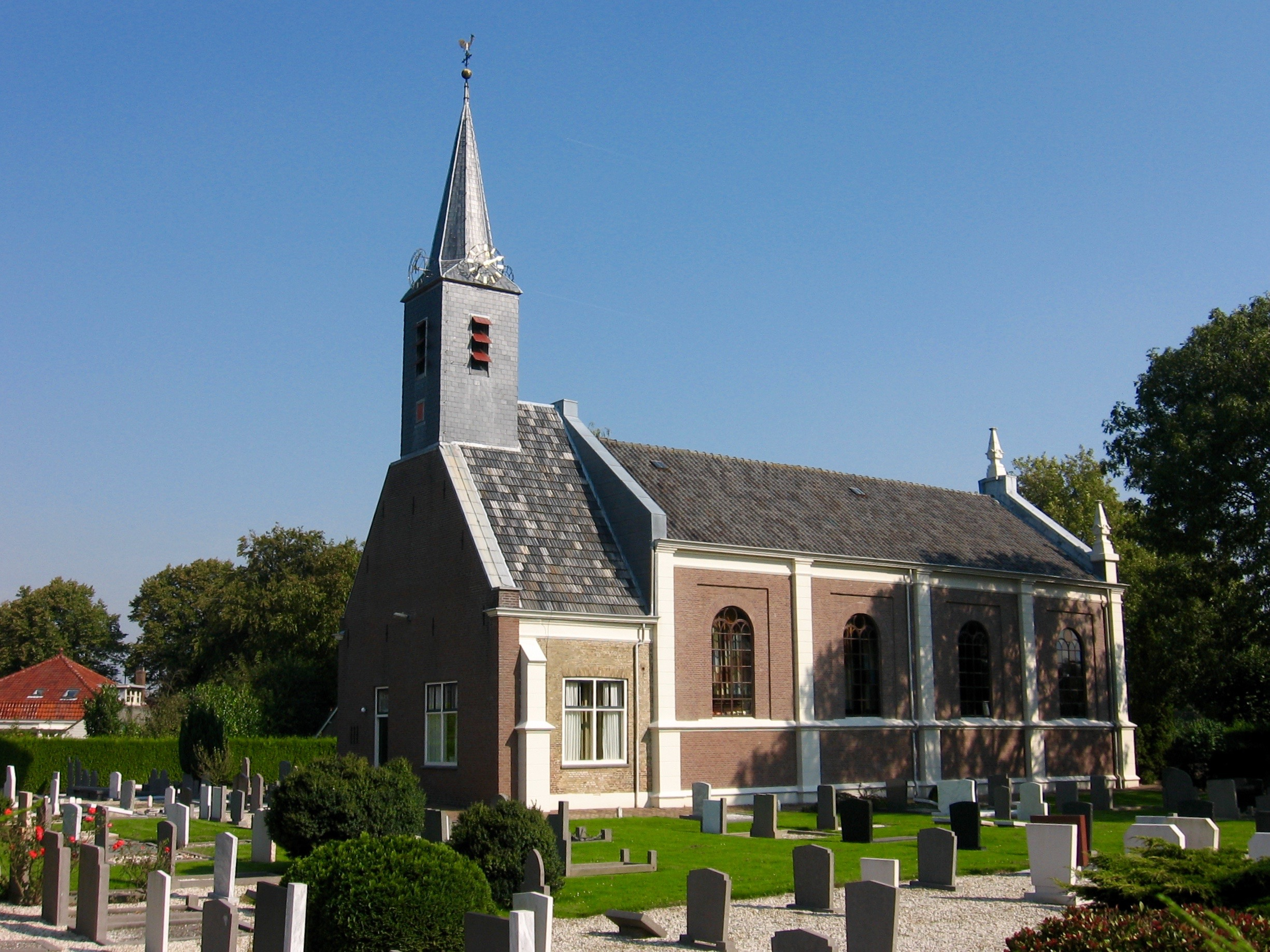
- Dutch Reformed church

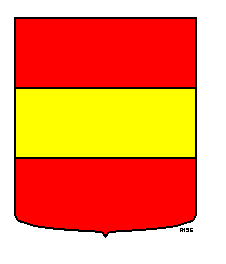
- Coat of arms

- Location in the province of South Holland in the Netherlands Location in the Netherlands
- Coordinates: 51°47′N 4°33′E
- Country: Netherlands
- Province: South Holland
- Municipality: Hoeksche Waard

Area
  - Total: 9.62 km^{2} (3.71 sq mi)
- Elevation: −1.0 m (−3.3 ft)

Population (2021)
  - Total: 3,235
  - Density: 336/km^{2} (871/sq mi)
- Time zone: UTC+1 (CET)
  - Summer (DST): UTC+2 (CEST)
- Postal code: 3299
- Dialing code: 0186

Maasdam is a village in the Dutch province of South Holland. It is located about 14 km south of the city of Rotterdam, in the municipality of Hoeksche Waard, on the rural Hoeksche Waard island. From the 14th Century until around 1800, Maasdam was also the name of the local administrative area, the fief and later the "ambacht".

Subsequently, from 1 January 1812 until 1 January 1984, it became the name of the local municipality, which comprised the village of Maasdam and the surrounding polders. In the periods 1812–1817 and 1832–1984, the hamlet of Cillaarshoek and the hamlet and polder of Sint Anthoniepolder were also part of the municipality of Maasdam.

The municipality of Maasdam was eventually merged with some surrounding municipalities to become part of the new municipality of Binnenmaas. The exception was Cillaarshoek which was split and partly merged into the existing municipality of Strijen. On 1 January 2019 Binnenmaas was merged with Cromstrijen, Korendijk, Oud-Beijerland, and Strijen to form the municipality of Hoeksche Waard.

== History ==
Maasdam was founded in the 13th Century in an area which at the time was part of the County of Holland, a state within the Holy Roman Empire. The current village covers areas that were separated by the river Maas until a permanent dam was built around 1270, from which the village took its name. However, archaeological findings have indicated that the area hosted significant human habitations as early as the start of the Roman Flavian dynasty.

Excavations in several locations have suggested that there was a large Roman settlement in the Maasdam area (on the northern shore of the river) probably from around 70 AD. Remains have been found of Roman roads, a bridge, a burial field, a harbor complex and even a Roman version of a dam in the river Maas suggesting that it was seen as a location of strategic importance on the North Western border of the Roman Empire.

The more permanent foundation of "the Maasdam" around 1270 created a connection between the areas known as Poelwijk in the Tiesselijnswaard (north of the river) and Weede in the Grote Hollandse Waard (south of the river). The establishment of the Maasdam took place during the reign of Floris V. It was part of the establishment of the Grote Hollandse Waard which in itself was part of the long term policy of land reclamation by the Counts of Holland (since the reign of William I) who saw it as a way to strengthen their political and territorial powers in the region.

Maasdam was founded nearby a substantial castle on the banks of the river Maas, the remaining foundations of which were discovered in 1958 in a parcel of land near the road in Maasdam known as "Kromme Elleboog". For a long time, it was assumed that the ruins in Maasdam were those of the castle Duivestein. However, it has more recently been suggested that the ruins could instead be those of a castle that belonged to the Lords of Weede. The area with castle ruins in Maasdam is officially protected as a Rijksmonument.

Most of the village of Maasdam and surrounding areas, including the castle, were destroyed during the second St. Elizabeth's flood (1421), although the main dyke in Maasdam as well as the hamlet and polder of Sint Anthoniepolder and hamlet of Cillaarshoek survived.

Successful restoration was hindered by further floods as well as the Hook and Cod Wars but eventually Maasdam was restored to its former size soon after Philip the Good allowed his treasurer Jan Nemery, who had been the vassal of Maasdam for almost two decades, in 1435 to reclaim the polders next to the surviving dyke in Maasdam from the sea.

Former vassals of Maasdam

- Jan Nemery, 1416–1438
- Jacob Nemery, 1438–1497
- Jacob Heerman, 1497–1505
- Gijsbrecht Heerman, 1505–1541
- Boudewijn Heerman, 1541–1578
- Pieternella van Hooghlande, 1578
- Jonkheer Arent van Dorp, 1578–1600
- Anna van Dorp, 1600
- Philips van den Bossche, 1600–1612
- Jacques Manrycque, 1612–1615
- Anthonie Manrycque, 1615–1653
- Frederik van Dorp, 1653–1700
- Carel Filips van Dorp, 1700–1726
- Anna Maria van Dorp, 1726–1738
- Adam Filips van der Duin, 1738–1739
- Arnold Joost van der Duin, 1739–1793
- Adam François Maximiliaan van der Duyn, 1793–1814
- Frans Adam Jules Armand van der Duyn van Maasdam, 1814–1848

The last vasal of Maasdam, Frans Adam van der Duyn van Maasdam (1771–1848), was one of the three noblemen who briefly formed the provisional government of the Netherlands after its liberation from Napoleonic France by Prussian and Russian troops in 1813. He was part of the Triumvirate of 1813 that declared the Sovereign Principality of the United Netherlands and invited William Frederick, Prince of Orange-Nassau to return from exile in England and accept sovereignty over the principality.

== Notable people ==
Kees Verkerk, Olympic speed skater

== Gallery ==
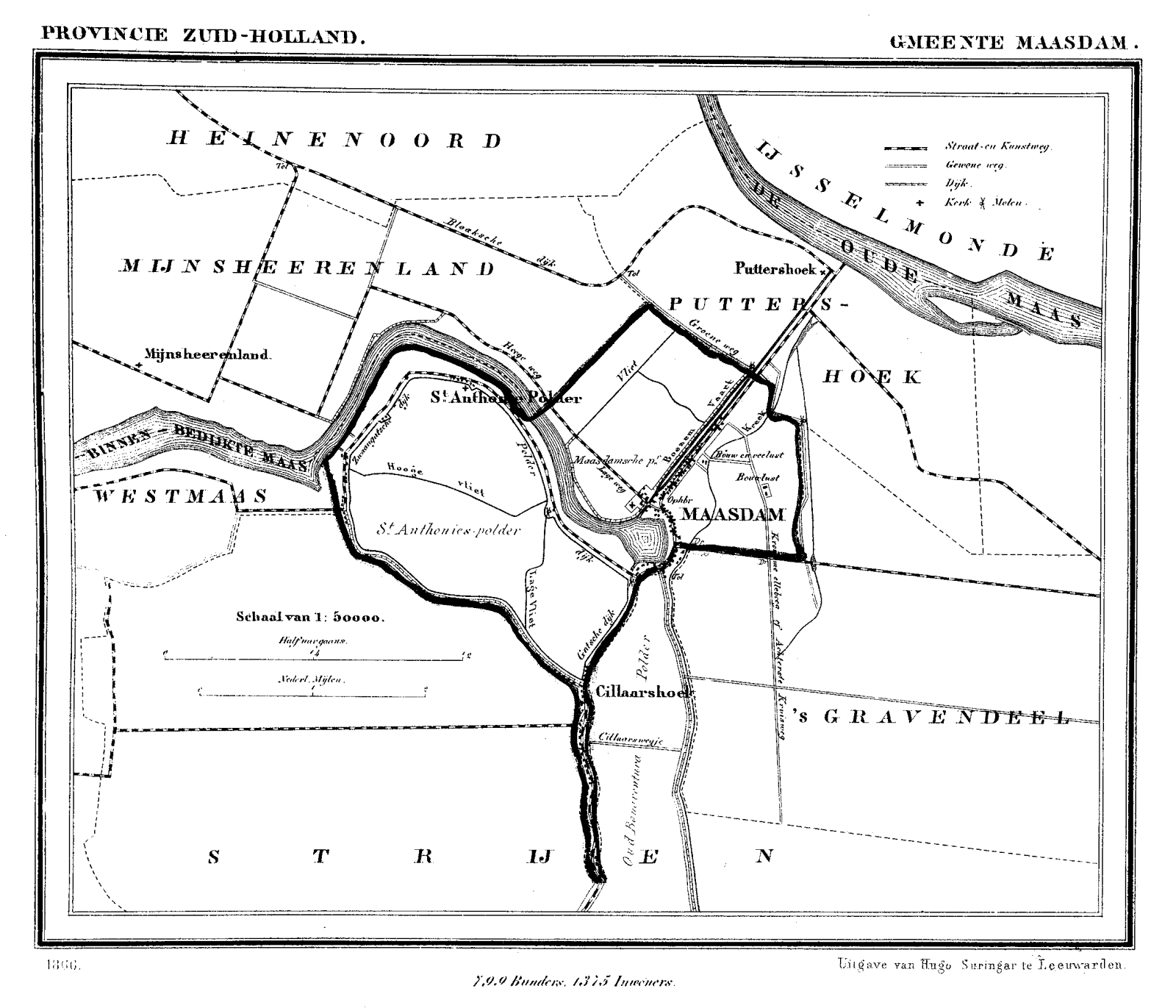
Map of the former municipality of Maasdam around 1871

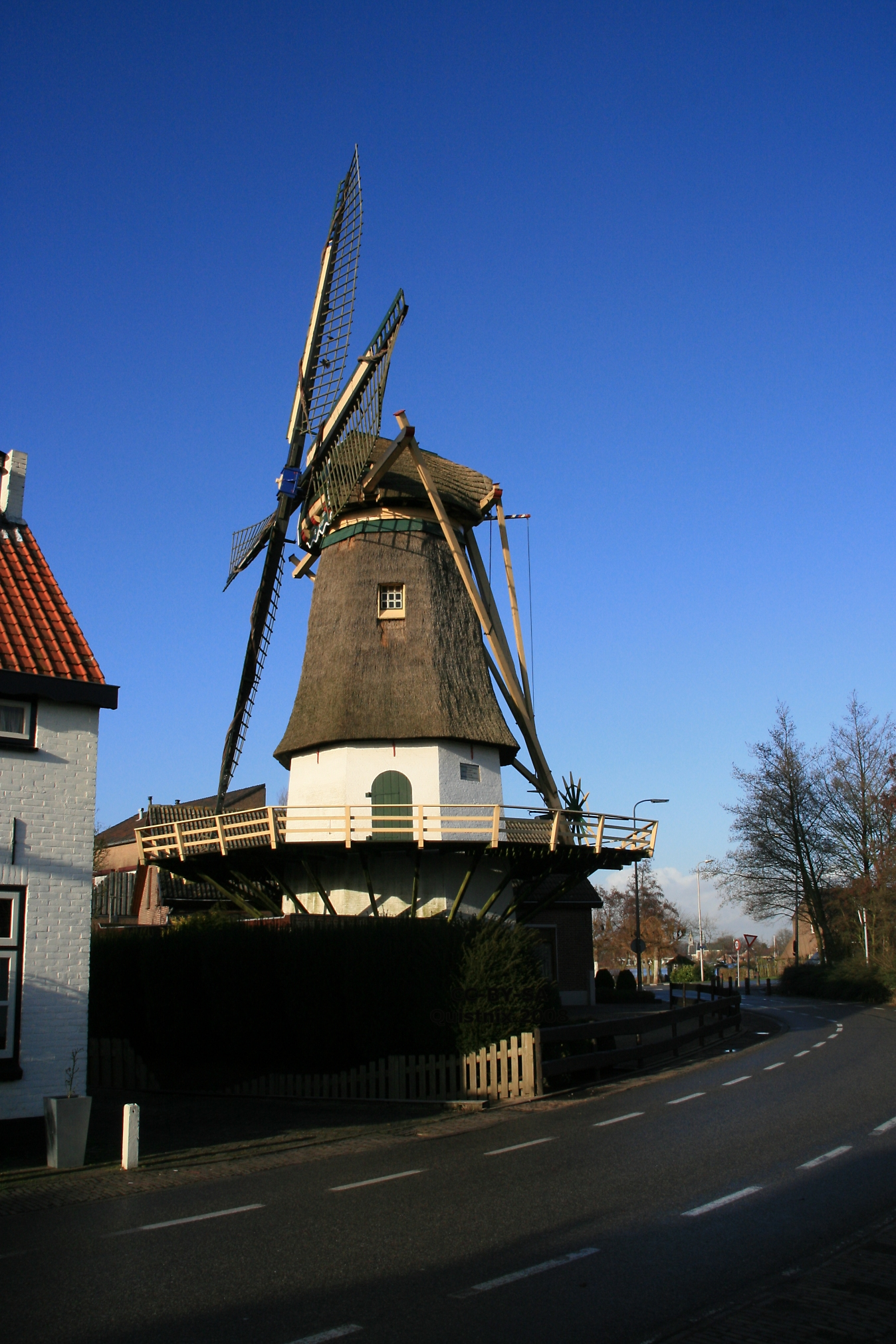
Windmill De Hoop

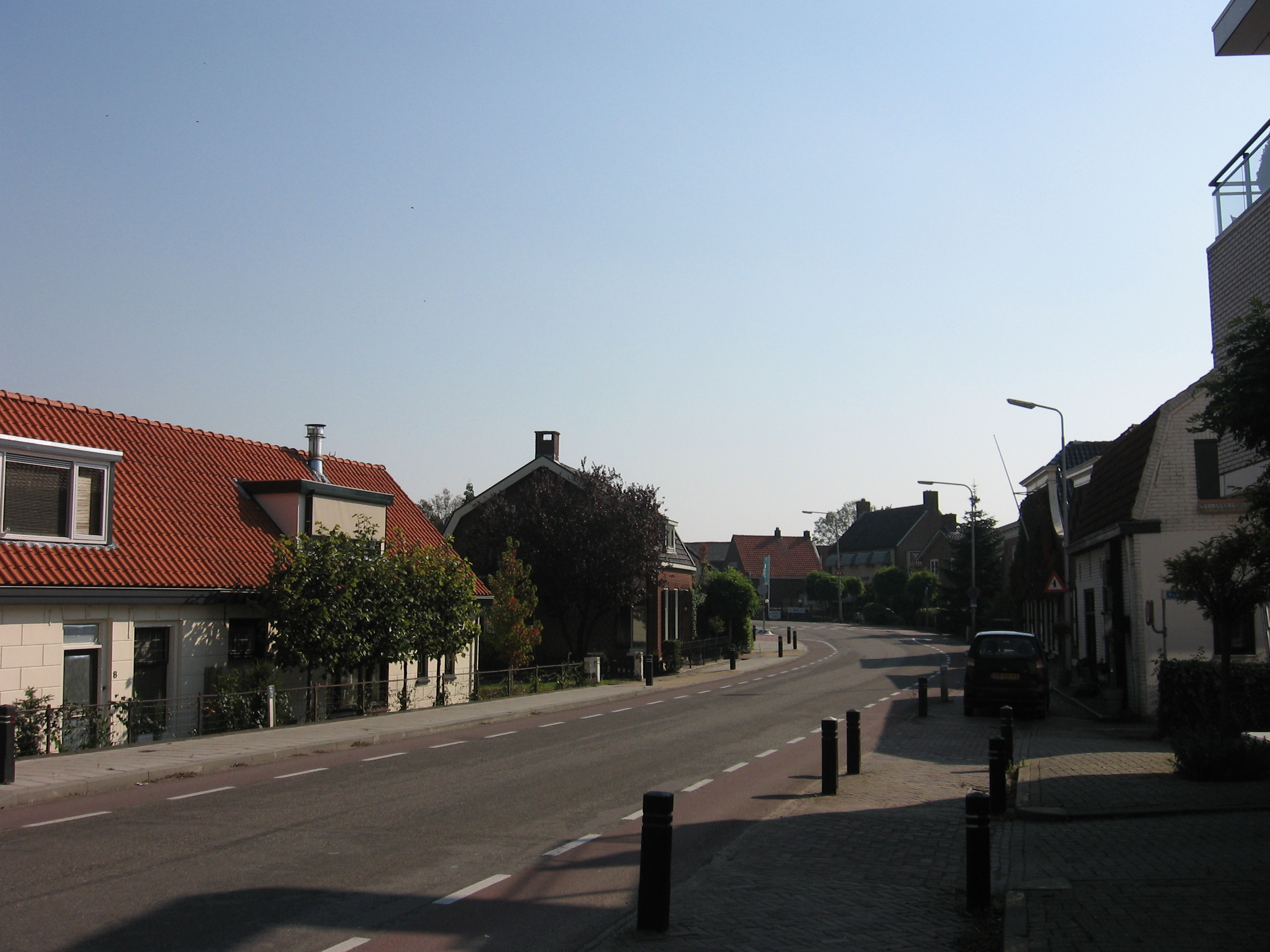
Street view

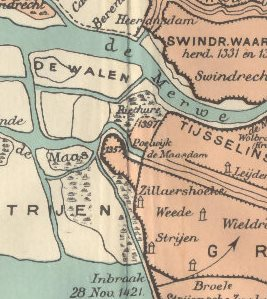
Detail of a 20th-century map of the Grote Hollandse Waard, depicting the geography of Maasdam and surrounding area just before the second St. Elizabeth's flood (1421) which submerged most of the land shown.
