= Suze Groeneweg =

Dutch politician (1875–1940)

Suzanna "Suze" Groeneweg
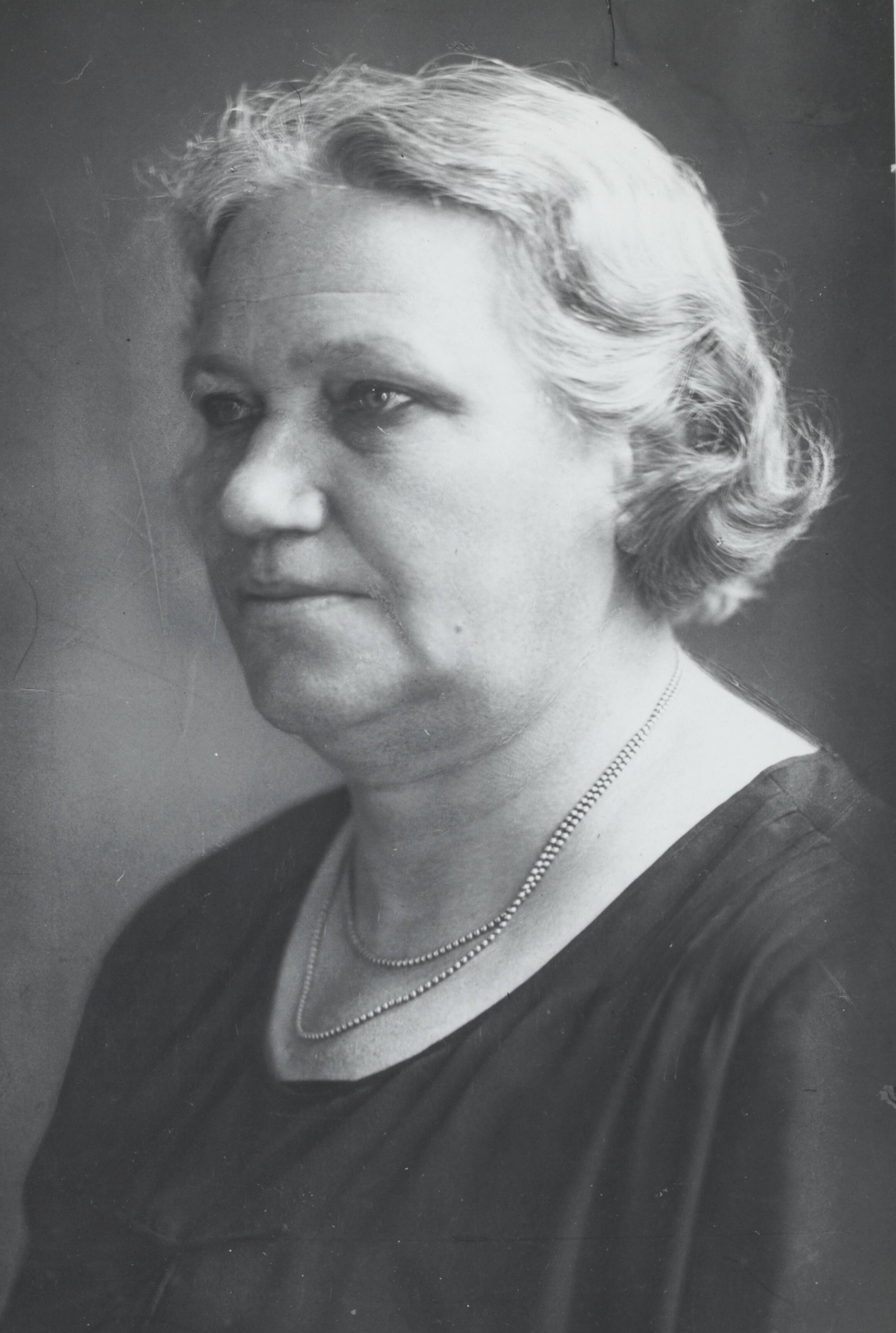
- Born: 4 March 1875; Strijensas, Netherlands
- Died: 19 October 1940 (aged 65); Barendrecht, Netherlands
- Occupation: Member of the House of Representatives of the Netherlands
- Political party: Social Democratic Workers' Party

Suzanna "Suze" Groeneweg (4 March 1875 – 19 October 1940) was a Dutch politician of the Social Democratic Workers' Party (SDAP). She was the first woman to be elected to the Dutch parliament.

Groeneweg was a teacher in Rotterdam. She was active in the work for people's education, and also for gender equality, although she did not participate in separate women's groups but preferred to work from within the party. She was also active within the temperance union and the pacifist movement.

Groeneweg was a member of the central committee of the social democratic party, SDAP, in 1917, when passive women's suffrage was introduced: women could be voted into office, but could not vote themselves. In 1918, the first election after women were allowed to run for office, she was elected to parliament as the first woman and sat in the chamber alongside 99 men.

On 1 January 1920, women in the Netherlands got the right to vote as well (which right they first used at the 1922 elections). Suze Groeneweg was re-elected in 1922, and, in part due to the proportional representation system in use, six other women joined her in the House of Representatives - Johanna Westerman, Betsy Bakker-Nort, Elisabeth van Dorp, Sophie Bronsveld-Vitringa, Frida Mackay-Kayz and Agnes de Vries-Bruins.

Groeneweg remained a member of the House of Representatives until June 1937. She was also member of the municipal council of Rotterdam between 1919 and 1931, and the Provincial Council of South Holland between 1919 and 1937.

== Decorations ==
- In 1937 she was awarded Knight of the Order of the Netherlands Lion.

== See also ==
- List of peace activists
