= Johanna Westerman =

Dutch politician (1866–1943)

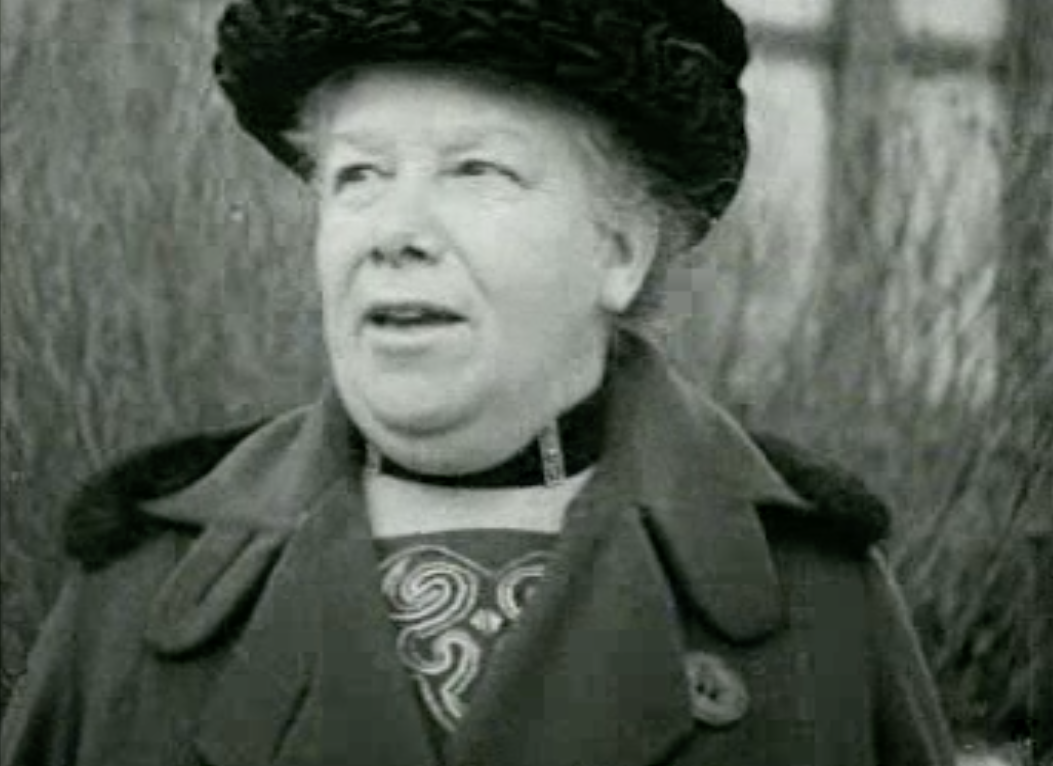
- Westerman in 1923

Member of the House of Representatives
- In office 1921–1933

Personal details
- Born: 15 December 1866 Amsterdam, Netherlands
- Died: 2 July 1943 (aged 76) Amsterdam, Netherlands
- Party: Free-thinking Democratic League (until 1917) Economic League (1917–1921) Liberal State Party (from 1921)
- Occupation: Teacher; politician

Johanna "Jo" Westerman (15 December 1866 – 2 July 1943) was a Dutch teacher, politician, and feminist. She became the second female member of the Dutch House of Representatives in 1921.

== Early life and education ==
Westerman was the daughter of bookseller, publisher, and linguist William Marten Westerman and Johanna Frederica Smaale. The later banker Willem Westerman was her older brother. She attended the three-year Hogere Burgerschool and the kweekschool and obtained various teaching certificates.

== Career ==
From 1886 she worked in various positions in education and published occasionally columns in De Sumatra Post. From 1909 she held board positions in the Dutch Association for Women's Suffrage.

From 1921 to 1933, Westerman was a member of the House of Representatives, initially for the Economic League, and from 1925 for the Liberal State Party. As an education expert, she was well known among her male colleagues and the parliamentary press. She was also committed to women's emancipation in general, for example through an amendment regarding the eligibility of women as mayor or municipal secretary, proposed together with Suze Groeneweg (it was not until 1946 that Truus Smulders-Beliën was appointed the first female mayor). After 1933, Westerman was still a board member, and ultimately president of the Dutch Women's Council.

== Decorations ==
Honours
Ribbon bar	Honour	Country	Date	Source
	Knight of the Order of the Netherlands Lion	Netherlands	1929	
