= Sint Anthoniepolder =

- Hamlet
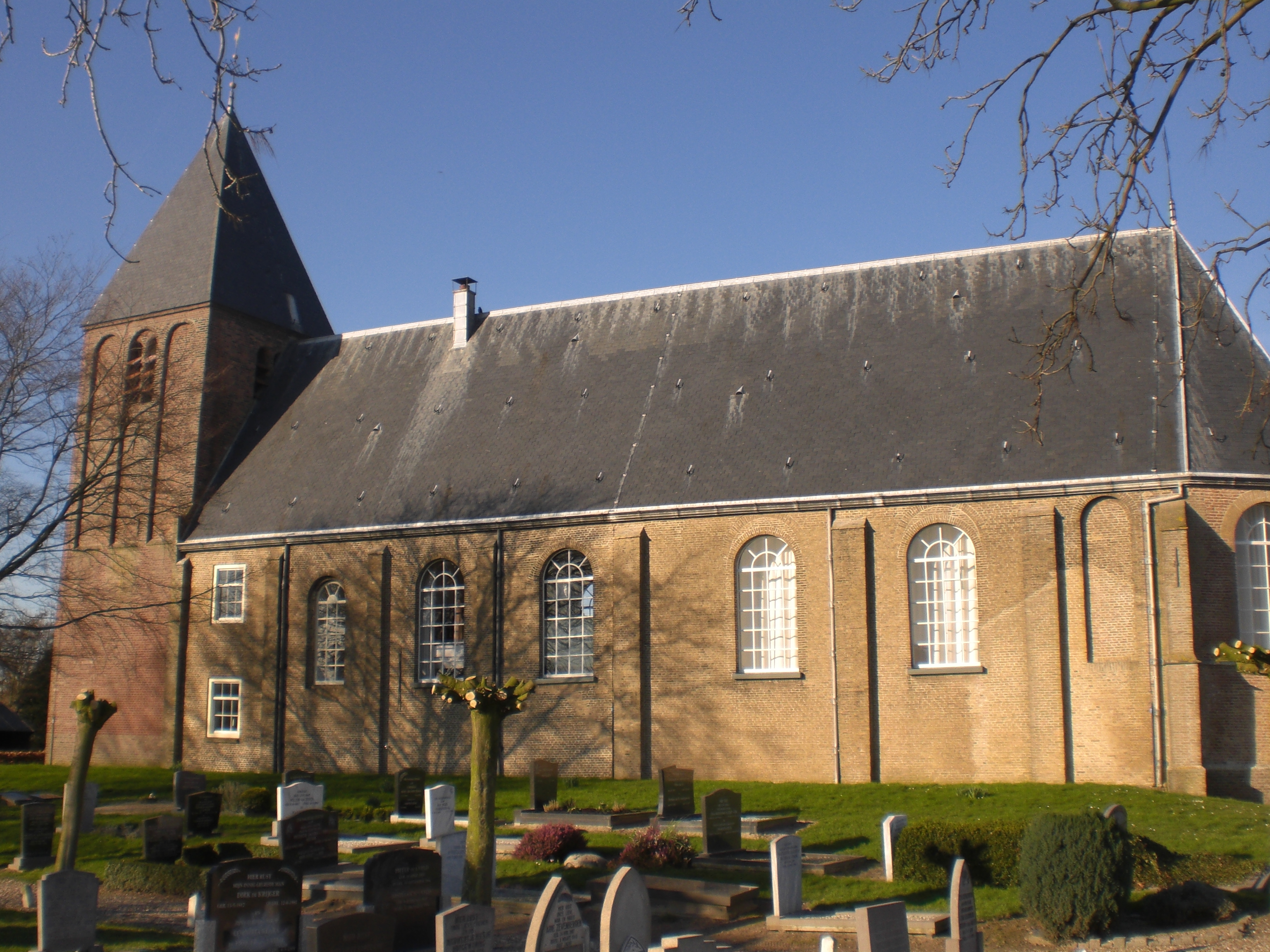
- Dutch Reformed church

- Location in the province of South Holland in the Netherlands Location in the Netherlands
- Coordinates: 51°47′50″N 4°32′0″E
- Country: Netherlands
- Province: South Holland
- Municipality: Hoeksche Waard

Sint Anthoniepolder is a hamlet in the Dutch province of South Holland. It is located about 14 km south of the city of Rotterdam, in the municipality of Hoeksche Waard.

The Dutch Reformed church dates from the 16th century, but has a tower from before 1358. The Poldersche Molen is a polder mill from 1749. In 1935, a pumping station was installed, but the windmill remained in service until c. 1957. Between 1974 and 1977, it was restored and is regularly in service, because during a storm the windmill can drain more than twice as much water than the pumping station.

Sint Anthoniepolder was a separate municipality from 1817 to 1839, when it became part of Maasdam.

Sint Anthoniepolder is not a statistical entity, and considered part of Klaaswaal. It has place name signs, however there is a directional sign to Sint Anthoniepolder. The hamlet consists of about 60 houses.

== Gallery ==
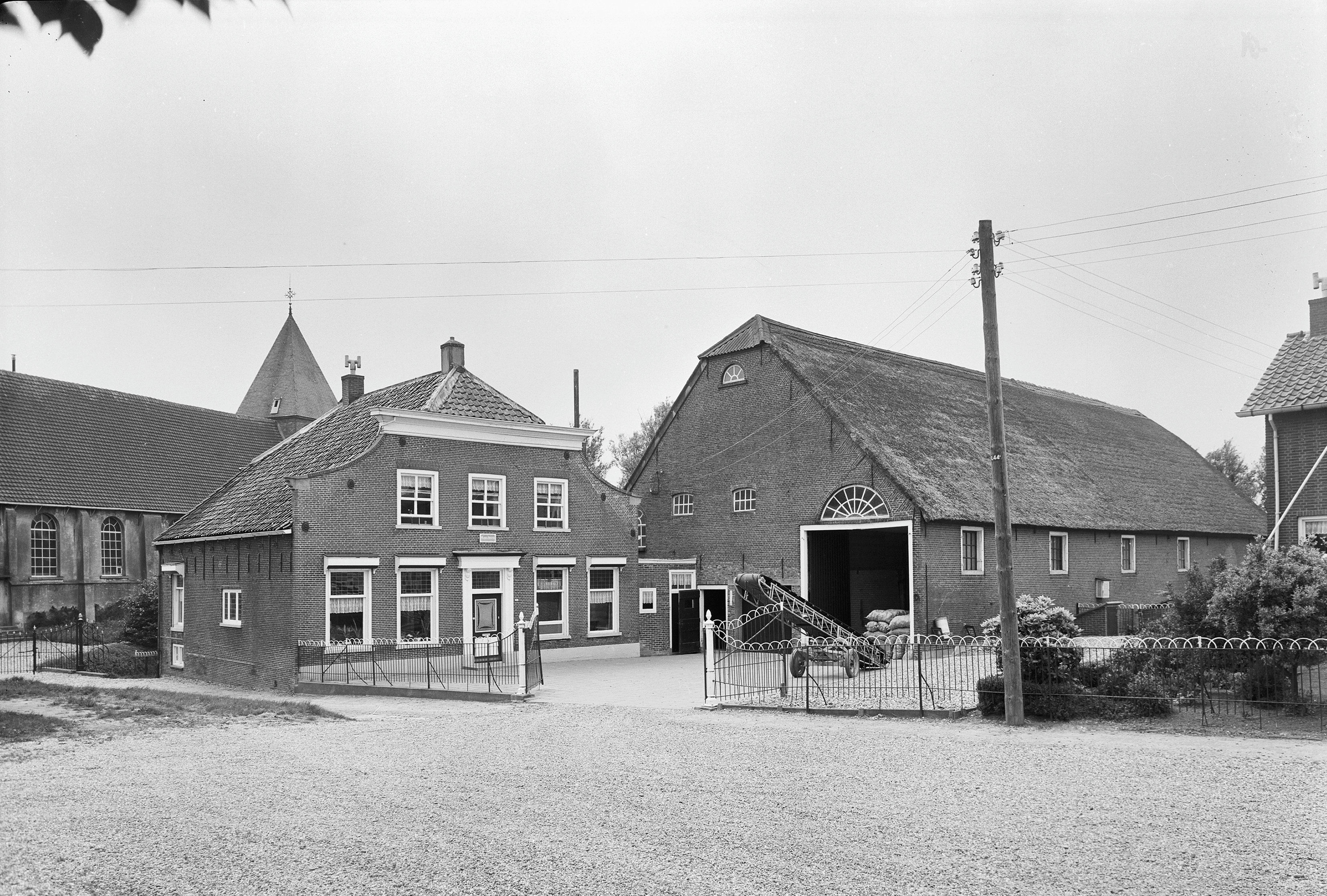
Farm Mariahoeve and view on Sint-Anthoniepolder

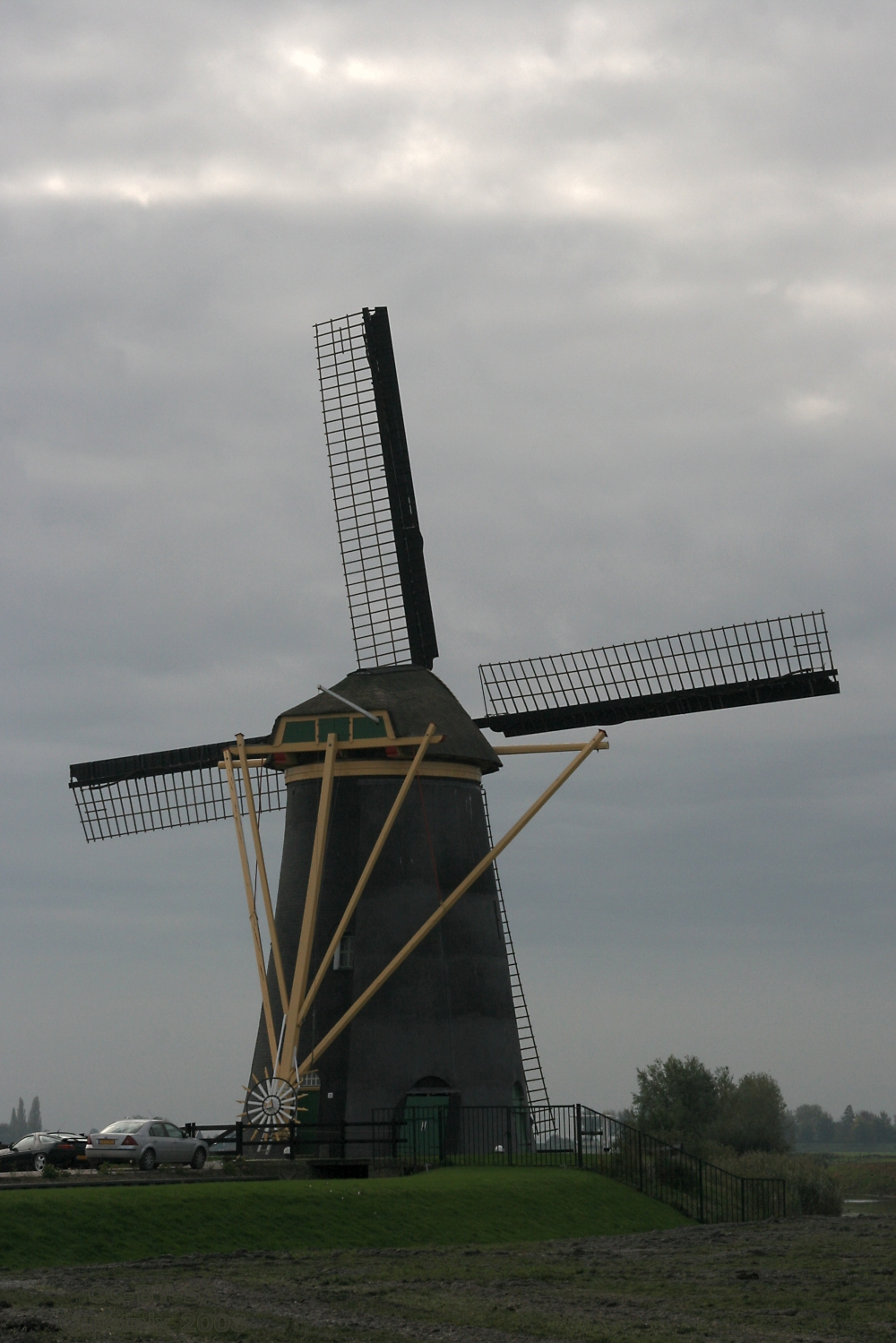
St Anthonymolen
