= Cillaarshoek =

Cillarshoek
- Hamlet
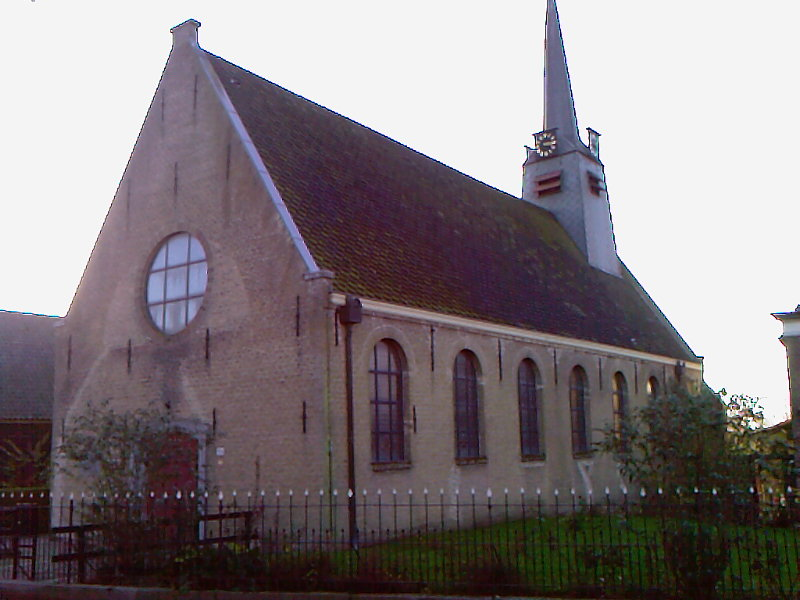
- Dutch Reformed church

- Location in the province of South Holland in the Netherlands Location in the Netherlands
- Coordinates: 51°46′14″N 4°32′46″E
- Country: Netherlands
- Province: South Holland
- Municipality: Hoeksche Waard

Cillaarshoek is a hamlet in the western Netherlands. It is located in the municipality of Hoeksche Waard, South Holland, about 15 km south of Rotterdam.

Cillaarshoek was a separate municipality between 1817 and 1832, when it became part of the municipality of Maasdam. In 1984, it became a part of the existing municipality of Strijen while the rest of the municipality of Maasdam was merged into the new municipality of Binnenmaas

The Dutch Reformed church is an aisleless with a little wooden tower which was built shortly after its predecessor was demolished in 1838.

Cillaarshoek is not a statistical entity, and considered part of Klaaswaal. It has place name signs, and consists of about 150 houses.
