= Oudendijk, Strijen =

Oudendijk
- Hamlet
- Location in the province of South Holland in the Netherlands Location in the Netherlands
- Coordinates: 51°46′28″N 4°29′16″E
- Country: Netherlands
- Province: South Holland
- Municipality: Hoeksche Waard

Oudendijk is a hamlet in the Dutch province of South Holland and is part of the municipality of Hoeksche Waard. Oudendijk lies 3 km south east from Westmaas.

Oudendijk is not a statistical entity, and considered part of Strijen. It has no place name signs, and consists of about 50 houses.
