= De Klem =

Mookhoek
- Hamlet
- Location in the province of South Holland in the Netherlands Location in the Netherlands
- Coordinates: 51°44′11″N 4°30′45″E
- Country: Netherlands
- Province: South Holland
- Municipality: Hoeksche Waard

De Klem is a hamlet in the Dutch province of South Holland and is part of the municipality of Hoeksche Waard. De Klem lies 3 km from the town of Strijen.

De Klem is not a statistical entity, and considered part of Strijen and Numansdorp. It has place name signs, and consists of about 30 houses.
