= Strijen =

Town in the Netherlands

- Town
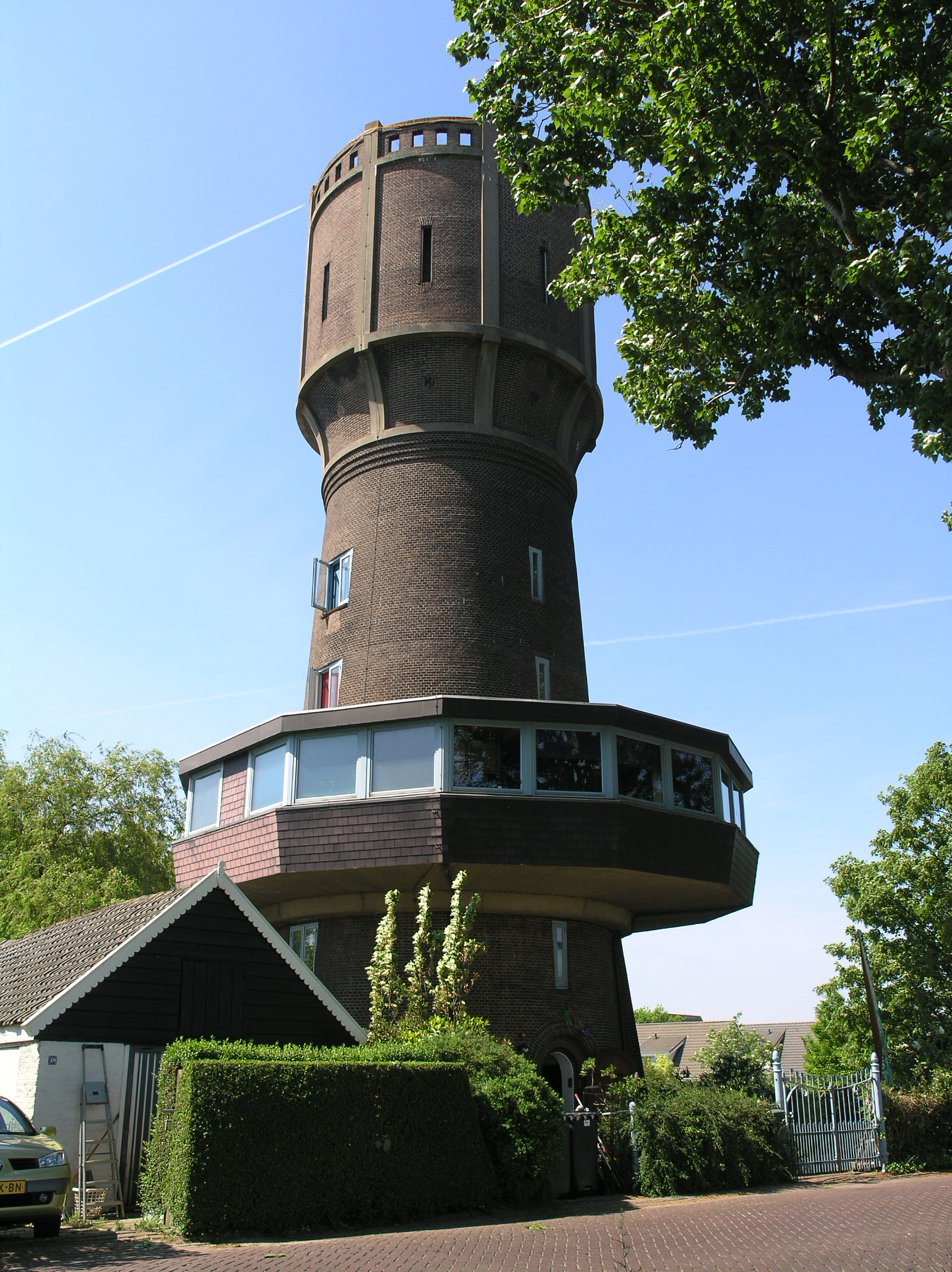
- Water tower of Strijen

- Flag Coat of arms

- Location in the province of South Holland in the Netherlands Location in the Netherlands
- Coordinates: 51°45′N 4°33′E
- Country: Netherlands
- Province: South Holland
- Municipality: Hoeksche Waard
- Merged: 2019

Area
  - Total: 57.70 km^{2} (22.28 sq mi)
  - Land: 50.85 km^{2} (19.63 sq mi)
  - Water: 6.85 km^{2} (2.64 sq mi)
- Elevation: 0 m (0 ft)

Population (January 2021)
  - Total: data missing
- Demonym: Strijenaar
- Time zone: UTC+1 (CET)
  - Summer (DST): UTC+2 (CEST)
- Postcode: 3290–3293
- Area code: 078
- Website: www.strijen.nl

Strijen (Dutch pronunciation: [ˈstrɛiə(n)]) is a town and former municipality in the western Netherlands, in the province of South Holland. The municipality, covering an area of 57.70 km^{2} (22.28 sq mi) of which 6.85 km^{2} (2.64 sq mi) is water, is located on the Hoeksche Waard island along the Hollands Diep estuary. On 1 January 2019 it was merged with the municipalities of Binnenmaas, Cromstrijen, Korendijk, and Oud-Beijerland to form the municipality of Hoeksche Waard.

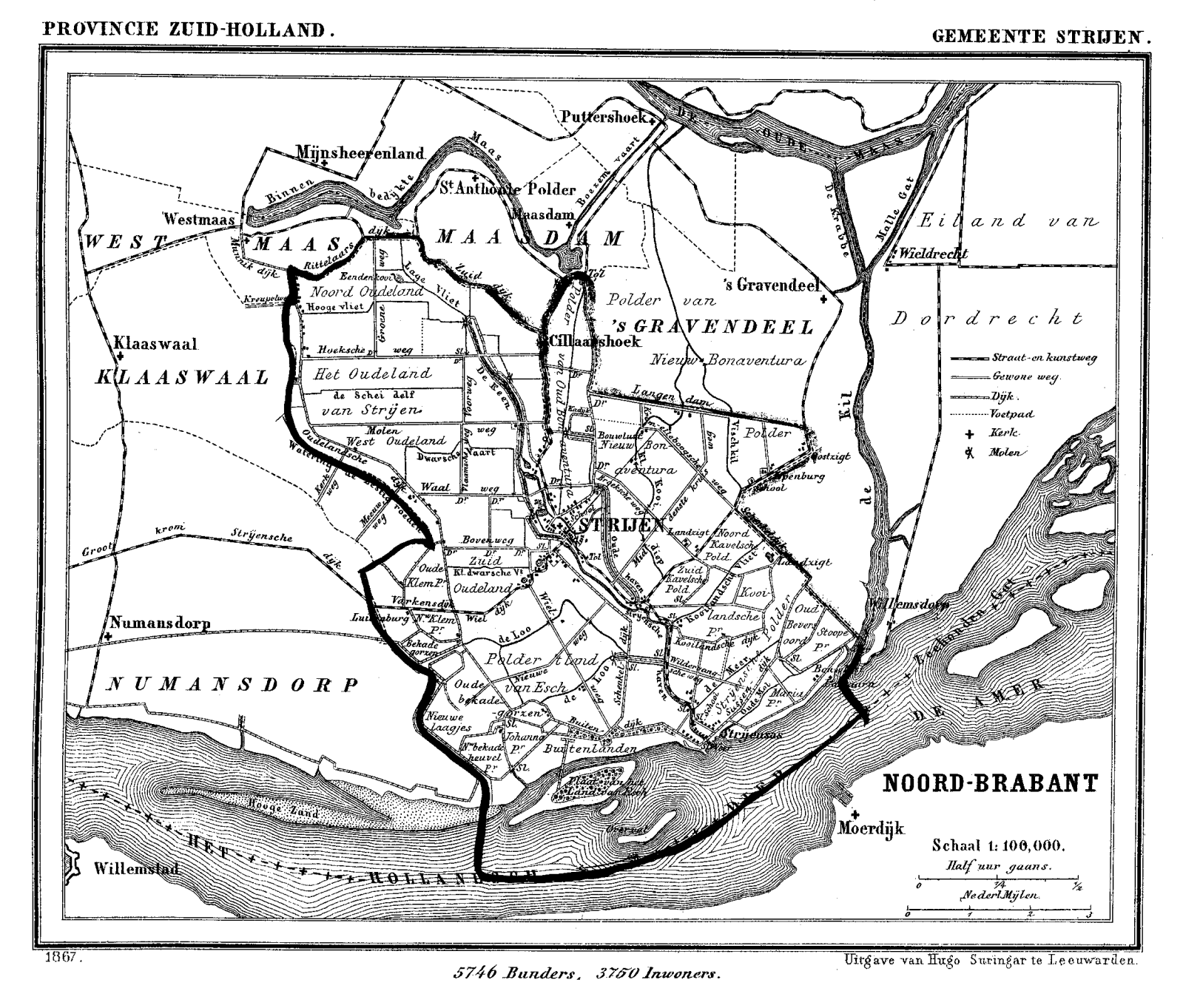
Strijen in 1867

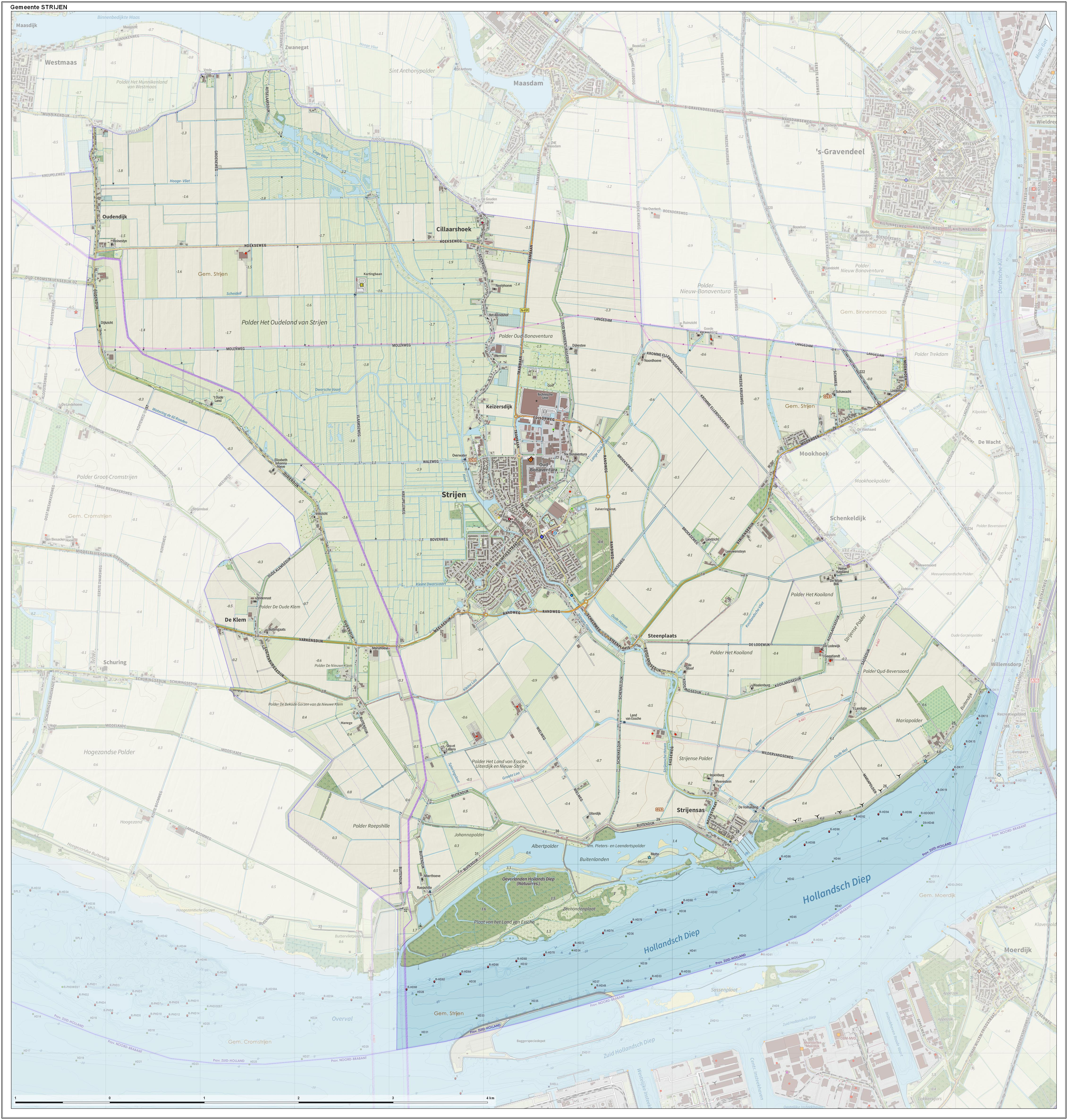
Strijen in 2015

Strijen hosts a public library, swimming pool, a small shopping centre and a local museum.

Furthermore, Strijen is home to an important and welcome resting stop for migrating birds, especially geese. During winter, the endangered Eurasian spoonbill uses this area as a foraging ground.

The municipality of Strijen also included the population centres of Cillaarshoek, De Klem, Mookhoek, Oudendijk, and Strijensas.

== Notable people ==
- Anton Corbijn (born 1955), photographer, music video director and film director.
