= Strijensas =

- Village
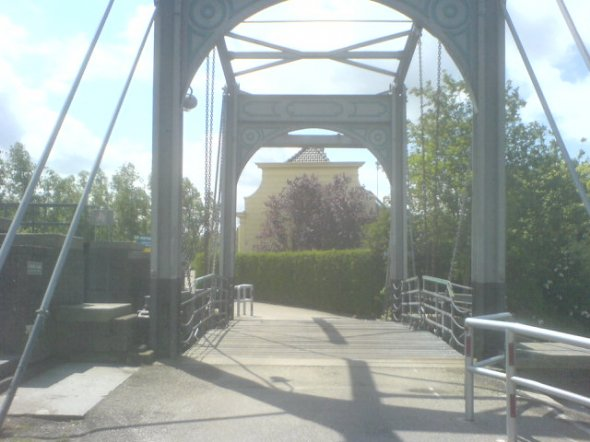
- The bridge crossing the Lock in Strijensas

- Location in the province of South Holland in the Netherlands Location in the Netherlands
- Coordinates: 51°42′57″N 4°35′10″E
- Country: Netherlands
- Province: South Holland
- Municipality: Hoeksche Waard

Strijensas is a village in the Dutch province of South Holland. It is located about 12 km southwest of the city of Dordrecht, and 9km north of Moerdijk in the municipality of Hoeksche Waard.

The village was first mentioned in 1617 as "'t Sas van Stryen", and means "the sluice of Strijen". Strijensas developed after 1650 at the mouth of the harbour canal of Strijen.

The first Dutch Reformed church was built in 1879. In February 1945, it was destroyed by war and replaced in 1952.

Strijensas was home to 301 people in 1840. Nowadays, it consists of about 180 houses. It was a separate municipality between 1817 and 1855, when it became part of Strijen. In 2019, it became part of the municipality of Hoeksche Waard.
