= 1891 Dutch general election =

- 9 June 1891 (first round); 23 June 1891 (second round)
- All 100 seats in the House of Representatives; 51 seats needed for a majority
- Turnout: 71.64% (▼9.77pp)
Party	Leader	Vote %	Seats	+/–
LU	Hendrik Goeman Borgesius	47.44	54	+9
ARP	Abraham Kuyper	23.08	20	−7
Catholic		19.44	25	−1
Radicals	Boelo Luitjen Tijdens	0.85	1	+1
This lists parties that won seats. See the complete results below.
Results by constituency
Cabinet before	Cabinet after
Mackay cabinet Coalition	Van Tienhoven cabinet Liberal

General elections were held in the Netherlands on 9 June 1891, with a second round in 25 constituencies on 23 June. The Liberal Union emerged as the largest party, winning 54 of the 100 seats in the House of Representatives.

== Electoral system ==
Of the 100 seats in the House of Representatives, 79 were elected in single-member constituencies using the two-round system.

The other 21 were elected using two-round plurality block voting in 5 constituencies from 2 to 9 seats. To be elected in the first round, a candidate had to reach an electoral threshold of 50% of the number of valid votes cast, divided by the number of seats up for election in the district.

== Results ==
Party	First round			Second round			Total seats	+/–
Party	Votes	%	Seats	Votes	%	Seats	Total seats	+/–
Liberal Union	167,611	47.44	41	31,606	41.88	13	54	+9
Anti-Revolutionary Party	81,529	23.08	12	22,019	29.18	8	20	–7
Catholics	68,695	19.44	21	16,428	21.77	4	25	–1
Radicals	3,003	0.85	0	2,627	3.48	1	1	+1
Social Democratic League	931	0.26	0	919	1.22	0	0	–1
Other parties	31,514	8.92	0	1,869	2.48	0	0	–1
Total	353,283	100.00	74	75,468	100.00	26	100	0
Valid votes	212,559	99.06		75,468	98.79			
Invalid votes	397	0.19		171	0.22			
Blank votes	1,610	0.75		751	0.98			
Total votes	214,566	100.00		76,390	100.00			
Registered voters/turnout	299,519	71.64		91,010	83.94			
Source: Kiesraad, Huygens

=== By district ===
Social Democratic Radical Liberal Conservative Anti-Revolutionary Catholic

District results for the Dutch general election, 1891
District	Incumbent	Winner	Ref.
Alkmaar	Willem van der Kaay		
Almelo	Willem Cremers		
Amersfoort	Jan Schimmelpenninck van der Oye		
Amsterdam	Willem Hendrik de Beaufort		
Amsterdam	Jacob Theodoor Cremer		
Amsterdam	Johan George Gleichman		
Amsterdam	Abraham Hartogh		
Amsterdam	Bernardus Hermanus Heldt		
Amsterdam	Arnold Kerdijk		
Amsterdam	Adriaan Gildemeester	Isaäc Abraham Levy	
Amsterdam	Jan Rutgers van Rozenburg		
Amsterdam	Johannes Tak van Poortvliet		
Apeldoorn	Frederik van Bylandt		
Appingedam	Jan Schepel		
Arnhem	Willem Rooseboom	Pieter Rink	
Assen	Warmold Albertinus van der Feltz		
Bergen op Zoom	Lambert de Ram		
Bergum	Okke Tietes Bosgra	Hubert Philippus de Kanter	
Beverwijk	Jacob Boreel van Hogelanden		
Bodegraven	Simon van Velzen		
Breda	Louis Michiels van Verduynen		
Breukelen	Willem Jan Roijaards van den Ham		
Brielle	Gerardus Jacobus Goekoop		
Delft	Henri Adolphe van de Velde		
Den Bosch	Pierre Guillaume Jean van der Schrieck		
Den Haag	Lodewijk van Kempen	Jan Conrad	
Den Haag	Henri Daniel Guyot		
Den Haag	Rutger Jan Schimmelpenninck	Jacobus Pijnacker Hordijk	
Den Helder	Simon Taco Land		
Deventer	Albertus van Delden		
Doetinchem	Jean Gustave Stanislas Bevers		
Dokkum	Ulrich Herman Huber		
Dordrecht	Hugo van Gijn		
Druten	Jacobus Travaglino		
Ede	Constant van Löben Sels		
Eindhoven	Willem Mutsaers	Josephus Smits van Oyen	
Elst	Godert Willem van Dedem		
Emmen	Hendrik Jan Smidt		
Enkhuizen	Jan Zijp		
Enschede	Willem Jacob Geertsema		
Franeker	Franciscus Lieftinck		
Goes	Levinus Keuchenius		
Gorinchem	Hendrik Seret		
Gouda	Otto van Wassenaer van Catwijck	Meindert Boogaerdt	
Grave	Jan Harte van Tecklenburg		
Groningen	Samuel van Houten		
Groningen	Jacob Dirk Veegens		
Gulpen	Leonard Ruland	Iwan de Marchant et d'Ansembourg	
Haarlem	Antonie Farncombe Sanders		
Haarlemmermeer	Frederic Reekers		
Harlingen	Walle Melis Oppedijk		
Helmond	Petrus Vermeulen		
Hilversum	Theodoor Philip Mackay		
Hontenisse	Felix Walter		
Hoorn	Willem Karel van Dedem	Petrus Boele Jacobus Ferf	
Kampen	Titus van Asch van Wijck	Maarten Noordtzij	
Katwijk	Johannes Hendricus Donner		
Leeuwarden	Johannis Zaaijer		
Leiden	Hendrik Johannes Bool		
Lochem	Carel Marie Brantsen	Egbert Broer Kielstra	
Loosduinen	Arnoldus van Berckel		
Maastricht	Jan Hubert Joseph Schreinemacher		
Meppel	Harm Smeenge		
Middelburg	Christiaan Lucasse		
Nijmegen	Franciscus Dobbelmann		
Ommen	Jan van Alphen		
Oostburg	Nicolaas Glinderman	Pieter Hennequin	
Oosterhout	Theodorus Borret	Isaäc van den Berch van Heemstede	
Rheden	Maximilien Kolkman		
Ridderkerk	Theo Heemskerk	Arie Smit	
Roermond	George Diepen		
Rotterdam	George Hermann Hintzen		
Rotterdam	Abraham van Karnebeek		
Rotterdam	Henry David Levyssohn Norman		
Rotterdam	Rudolf Pieter Mees		
Rotterdam	Willem Adriaan Viruly Verbrugge		
Schiedam	Allard van der Borch van Verwolde		
Schoterland	Ferdinand Domela Nieuwenhuis	Hendrik Pyttersen	
Sittard	Jerôme Lambrechts		
Sliedrecht	Barthold de Geer van Jutphaas		
Sneek	Willem Gerard Brantsen van de Zijp		
Steenwijk	Gerard Beelaerts van Blokland		
Tiel	Herman Jacob Dijckmeester		
Tilburg	Bernardus Marie Bahlmann		
Utrecht	August Seyffardt	Hendrik Adriaan van Beuningen	
Utrecht	Joan Röell		
Veendam	Hendrik Goeman Borgesius	Adriaan Louis Poelman	
Veghel	Bernardus van Vlijmen		
Venlo	Leopold Haffmans		
Waalwijk	Antonius Franciscus Vos de Wael	Willem Mutsaers	
Weert	Jean Clercx		
Wijk bij Duurstede	Herman Schaepman	Willem Hendrik de Beaufort	
Winschoten	Derk de Ruiter Zijlker	Boelo Luitjen Tijdens	
Wolvega	Ruurd Klazer Okma	Wesselius Marcus Houwing	
Zaandam	Willem de Meijier		
Zevenbergen	Joannes van Nunen		
Zierikzee	Jacob Johan van Kerkwijk		
Zuidhorn	Geuchien Zijlma		
Zutphen	Derck Engelberts	Hendrik Goeman Borgesius	
Zwolle	Alexander van Dedem		
