= Boelo Luitjen Tijdens =

Dutch farmer and politician (1858–1904)

- Boelo Luitjen Tijdens

Member of the House of Representatives
- In office 15 September 1891 – 17 September 1901
- Preceded by: Derk de Ruiter Zijlker
- Succeeded by: Dirk Bos
- Constituency: Winschoten

Personal details
- Born: 7 October 1858 Nieuw-Beerta, Netherlands
- Died: 28 May 1904 (aged 45) Nieuw-Beerta, Netherlands
- Other political affiliations: Volkspartij (1886–1891)
- Spouse: Jantje Geessiena Ebbens (m. 1881)
- Children: 4

Boelo Luitjen Tijdens (7 October 1858 – 28 May 1904) was a Dutch farmer and politician. The son of a wealthy "gentleman farmer" (herenboer) in Nieuw-Beerta, Tijdens grew alienated from the liberalism of his fellow farmers in the 1880s and became attracted to progressive, radical ideas. He was first elected to the Dutch House of Representatives in 1891 in the Winschoten electoral district as a "radical", but would increasingly move rightward throughout his time as MP, becoming known as a staunch protectionist, until his retirement as MP in 1901.

== Early life ==
Boelo Luitjen Tijdens was born on 7 October 1858 in Nieuw-Beerta to Jan Jacobs Tijdens Janszoon, a farmer, and Lucretia Boelema. His grandfather Jacob Tijdens was the son of a blacksmith from Nieuw-Beerta, who in 1827 had bought a farm on the tip of a land spit on the Dollard bay named the Stocksterhorn. Under Jacob Tijdens and his son Jan, the Tijdens family had worked themselves up and become wealthy "gentlemen farmers" (herenboeren).

Boelo Luitjen Tijdens attended primary school in Nieuw-Beerta and secondary school in Winschoten. In 1881, Tijdens took over the Stocksterhorn farm from his father.

Tijdens soon became active in local civic life. Initially politically liberal like the other gentlemen farmers in the area, in 1885 Tijdens had publicly debated the socialist Eelko Brader at a meeting and advocated for a limited electoral franchise. By 1886, Tijdens had quickly radicalized, becoming friends with socialist farmer Derk Roelfs Mansholt and being increasingly attracted to the ideas of figures such as Multatuli and Karl Marx. In February, he had spoken out in favor of universal male suffrage and a united front of workers, the bourgeoisie and farmers against capitalists, bankers and speculators. He was opposed to a revolution, seeking instead a decrease in taxation on wealth and excise taxes.

== Political career ==
In October 1886, Tijdens joined the People's Party (Volkspartij), a broad coalition of radical liberals and socialists, the last of which supported land collectivization and an end to private property. For the 1891 Dutch general election, the party failed to nominate a single candidate for the Winschoten electoral district. As a consequence, Tijdens ran against his old friend Derk Mansholt, with Tijdens being seen as the moderate versus the "socialist" Mansholt. Tijdens faced increasing suspicion from the left and many workers, but as many of them were unable to vote this had little impact. Tijdens was ultimately victorious, defeating the incumbent Derk de Ruiter Zijlker. His victory led to the withdrawal of Willem Treub, who had won in the Schoterland electoral district, after Treub had promised not to take up his seat should another radical candidate win a seat in order to allow Domela Nieuwenhuis to win in a by-election.

As an MP, Tijdens spoke mainly on agriculture, military affairs, and taxation. He was not a very influential MP, being rumored to spend much of his time at brothels in The Hague in his first years as MP. Though he had questioned ministers several times in 1892 and 1893, after 1894 Tijdens rarely spoke on the House floor.

In 1892, Tijdens submitted a motion in which he requested the Van Tienhoven cabinet to create a plan for expansion of the electorate within the year. He faced opposition from other left-liberals, such as Arnold Kerdijk, who saw the motion as amounting to a vote of no-confidence in the government, and Tijdens was the only MP who ended up voting in favor of his motion.

That year also saw significant violent unrest in the Oldambt region, in part caused by the revolutionary sentiment aroused by socialist figures such as Ferdinand Domela Nieuwenhuis and Tjerk Luitjes. In response, Tijdens held an emotional speech on the House floor about the "rabble threatening to take over" the region, and requested military assistance. This led to the army being sent into eastern Groningen, and martial law being declared in the region for three months, and his intervention helped Tijdens reconcile with his fellow "gentlemen farmers." In 1893, Tijdens founded the League of Order through Reform (Bond van Orde door Hervorming), which condemned the "terrorism, brought forth by a bunch of socialists", and provided loyal workers with subsidized milk and housing.

Tijdens participated in the commission which founded the Radical League in 1892, but did not become a member. Tijdens instead sat in the House of Representatives as an independent.

In the 1897 Dutch general election, Tijdens was initially defeated by both the progressive liberal Dirk Bos and the socialist Pieter Jelles Troelstra, but after Troelstra took up the seat of Tietjerkstradeel Tijdens won a subsequent by-election. By this time, Tijdens had become increasingly less radical, and had become a staunch protectionist.

Tijdens was an advocate for building canals in the Westerwolde region, founding an association to promote the cause and managing to have a plan on the subject passed unanimously through the House of Representatives. He continued supporting universal suffrage, being one of 20 MPs to vote in favor of a motion by Troelstra in support of it in 1901.

Tijdens chose not to run for reelection in the 1901 Dutch general election.

== Later life ==
After leaving politics, Tijdens bought a farm in Vlagtwedde and focused on lobbying politicians in support of his canal building plans. He also helped found several factories, including two dairy factories and a factory producing strawboard. Tijdens remained strongly opposed to socialism, arguing in favor of banning supporters of Ferdinand Domela Nieuwenhuis from being teachers.

Boelo Luitjen Tijdens died on 28 May 1904 of a heart attack, leaving the Stocksterhorn farm to his son Jan Jacob Tijdens.

The B.L. Tijdens Canal, on which construction began a year after his death, in eastern Groningen is named after Tijdens. In 1913, a monument dedicated to Tijdens was placed overlooking the canal.

== Personal life ==
Tijdens married Jantje Geessiena Ebbens in 1881. The couple had four children together. His descendants continued to run the Stocksterhorn farm until at least the 1990s. Tijdens belonged to the Dutch Reformed Church.

Tijdens was a knight in the Order of the Netherlands Lion.

== Bibliography ==
- Klijnsma, Meine Henk (2007). Om de Democratie: de Geschiedenis van de Vrijzinnig-Democratische Bond, 1901-1946 [About Democracy: the History of the Free-thinking Democratic League, 1901-1946] (in Dutch). Amsterdam: Bert Bakker. ISBN 978-90-351-3239-9.
- Taal, Gerrit (1980). Liberalen en radicalen in Nederland 1872-1901 (in Dutch). The Hague: Nijhoff.
- Westerman, Frank (2013-10-14). De graanrepubliek (in Dutch). Singel Uitgeverijen. ISBN 978-90-234-7947-5.
