= Bernardus Marie Bahlmann =

Dutch politician (1848–1898)

- Bernardus Marie Bahlmann ca. 1890

Member of the House of Representatives
- In office 13 December 1880 – 13 May 1898
- Preceded by: Ferdinand Hendrik Hubert Borret
- Succeeded by: Johannes Franciscus Jansen
- Constituency: Tilburg

Personal details
- Born: 20 August 1848 Groesbeek, Netherlands
- Died: 13 May 1898 (aged 49) Nijmegen, Netherlands
- Party: Roman Catholic (Bahlmannian)
- Education: Leiden University

Bernardus Marie Bahlmann (20 August 1848 – 13 May 1898) was a Dutch politician. He was a member of the Dutch House of Representatives from the Tilburg electoral district from 1880 until his sudden death in 1898. A conservative Roman Catholic politician, he was the leader of the informal Bahlmannian political group in the House of Representatives, in opposition to the smaller, more progressive Catholic parliamentary group led by Herman Schaepman.

== Early life ==
Bernardus Marie Bahlmann was born on 20 August 1848 in Groesbeek to Bernardus Johannes Josephus Franciscus, who was of German origin, and Maria Agnes Elisabeth Biederlack. In 1863, Bahlmann began attending secondary school in Münster, graduating in 1867. From 1867 to 1872, Bahlmann worked as a trader in manufactured goods, first in Nijmegen and later in Manchester. In 1872, he enrolled at Leiden University to study law, graduating cum laude in 1878. Bahlmann subsequently began working as a lawyer in Rotterdam.

== Political career ==
Bahlmann was first elected to the House of Representatives in December 1880 for the Tilburg electoral district. As an MP, Bahlmann spoke on various issues, including foreign and Dutch East Indies affairs, justice, taxation and trade, labor and water infrastructure. Throughout the 1880s, Bahlmann was re-elected with increasingly large margins, and was re-elected unopposed in the 1888 and 1891 Dutch general elections.

Ideologically, Bahlmann was a conservative Catholic MP, and he became the leader of the informal conservative "Bahlmannians" in the House of Representatives, which was also called "Centrum" after the German Zentrum party. This group was opposed by the smaller and relatively more progressive Schaepmannians, led by fellow Catholic MP Herman Schaepman, though most Catholic MPs were Bahlmannians. Although both sides agreed on support for the Catholic Church, including the abolition of the procession ban and equal status for religious and public schools, the faction led by Bahlmann opposed conscription, social legislation and universal suffrage.

In 1882, Bahlmann was one of 12 MPs a motion to begin parliamentary discussion on a bill to lower the qualifications to vote which led to the fall of the Van Lynden van Sandenburg cabinet, but in the 1890s was an opponent of both Johannes Tak van Poortvliet and Samuel van Houten's proposals to expand the franchise. In 1893, he was one of four Catholic MPs to vote in favor of establishing a tax on income. In 1896, Bahlmann was part of a commission aimed at establishing a formal Catholic political program, which was used by Schaepman to influence the resulting program in his favor and unite the two factions. Bahlmann also served as editor-in-chief of the newspaper De Maasbode.

In 1898, while giving a speech in the House of Representatives, Bahlmann suddenly collapsed, hitting his head on a bench behind him. A military doctor sitting in the public gallery was called in, but Bahlmann was eventually declared dead. Bahlmann died on 18 May 1898.
