= Geert van der Zwaag =

Dutch politician (1858-1923)

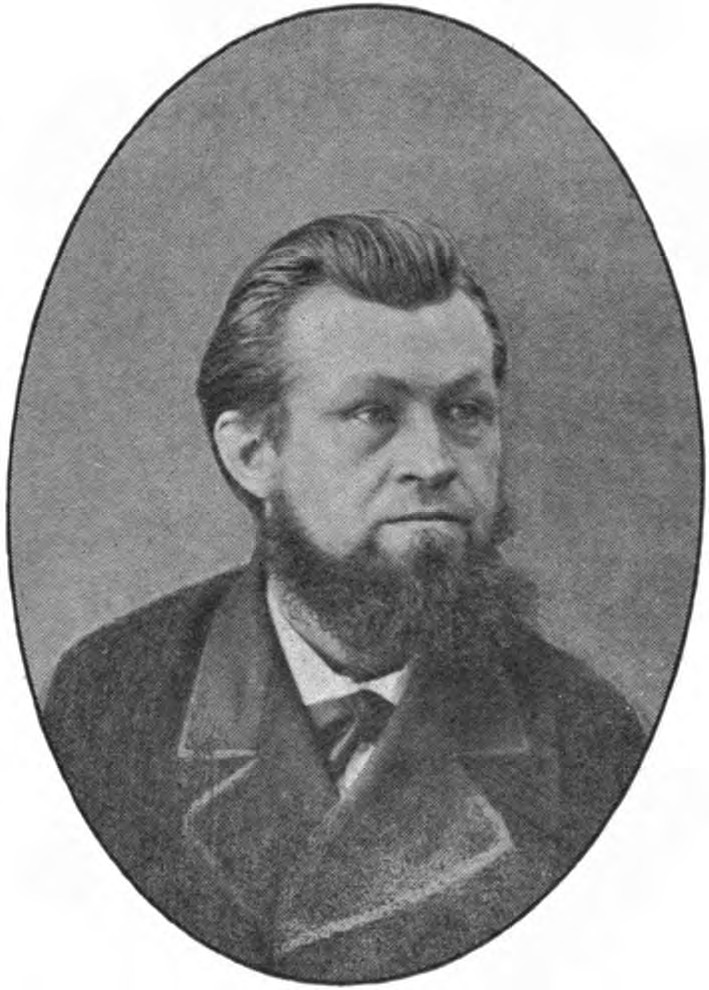
- Geert van der Zwaag

Member of the House of Representatives
- In office 21 September 1897 – 21 September 1909
- Preceded by: Hendrik Pyttersen
- Succeeded by: Joseph Limburg
- Constituency: Schoterland

Personal details
- Born: Geert Lourens van der Zwaag; 4 May 1858 Wolvega
- Died: 22 April 1923 (aged 64) Gorredijk
- Party: SDB (1891-1897); Free Socialists (1897-1901); Communist League (1902, 1908); Van der Zwaag List (1918)
- Spouse: Catharina Faber (m. 1880)
- Children: 5

Geert Lourens van der Zwaag (4 May 1858 – 22 April 1923) was a Dutch socialist politician. He served in the House of Representatives from 1897 to 1909 as an independent candidate in the district of Schoterland.

== Early life ==
Geert van der Zwaag was born on 4 May 1858 in Wolvega to Lourens Geerts van der Zwaag and Harmentje Josephs Houwman, both of whom died when Geert was very young. He was raised by his stepfather in Gorredijk, who pushed Geert to become a butcher against his wishes.

A liberal in his younger years, Van der Zwaag became a socialist after hearing Ferdinand Domela Nieuwenhuis speak in 1882 and engaging in a debate with him. He also became involved in the movement for universal suffrage during this period.

During Domela Nieuwenhuis' successful election campaign in the 1888 Dutch general election, Van der Zwaag was highly active in campaigning and would eventually join the Social Democratic League (SDB) in 1891. He founded the local socialist weekly newspaper for Schoterland and Wolvega districts De Klok in 1888, which he would be head editor of until 1913.

== Political career ==
Van der Zwaag was first elected to the House of Representatives in the Schoterland district in the 1897 Dutch general election. Politically, he was highly similar in views to his predecessor Ferdinand Domela Nieuwenhuis, supporting class struggle, a revolution, and the abolition of private ownership. He was also a staunch antimilitarist, anti-clericalist, and a temperance advocate. He was known as a fierce debater. He was occasionally supported in elections by the more moderate Social Democratic Workers' Party (SDAP), but never became a full member. He attempted to found an independent "Communist League" in 1902 and 1908, but was unable to as a result of his lack of organisational skills.

In 1899 Van der Zwaag was elected to the Opsterland municipal council, and in 1901 he was elected to the Friesland provincial council, serving in both offices until his death in 1923. In 1907, he was chosen as a member of the provincial executive of Friesland with the help of the liberals, who did not want an SDAP member and saw Van der Zwaag as a pliable alternative. In the 1918 Dutch general election, Van der Zwaag participated on an independent party list and gained 2600 votes, mostly in southeast Friesland, not enough for a seat in the House of Representatives.

Geert van der Zwaag died on 22 April 1923 in Gorredijk.
