= Beverwijk (electoral district) =

Beverwijk was an electoral district of the House of Representatives in the Netherlands from 1888 to 1918.

== Profile ==
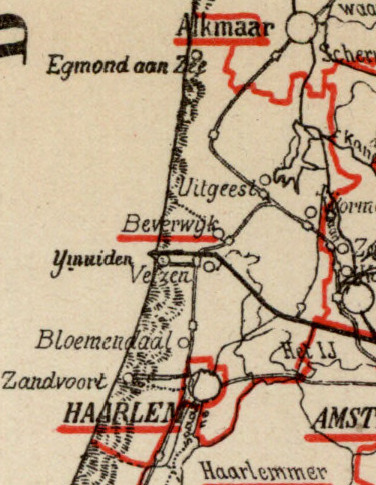
The district of Beverwijk in 1888

The electoral district of Beverwijk was created in 1888 out of parts of the Alkmaar and Haarlem districts, which were reduced from two seats to one. Fully located in the province of North Holland, it was centred on the city of Beverwijk and corresponded roughly to the Kennemerland region, running along the province's west coast, including the surroundings of Haarlem. Aside from Beverwijk, it included the municipalities of Akersloot, Assendelft, Bloemendaal, Castricum, Egmond aan Zee, Egmond-Binnen, Haarlemmerliede, Heemskerk, Krommenie, Limmen, Schoten, Spaarndam, Uitgeest, Velsen, Westzaan, Wijk aan Zee en Duin and Zandvoort. While it did not contain any large cities, it was a predominantly urban district.

The district's population increased considerably during its existence, from 45,363 in 1888 to 78,739 in 1909. A plurality of the population was Catholic, though its share of the population dropped slightly from 45% in 1888 to 41% in 1909. Members of the Dutch Reformed Church made up some 43% of the population in 1888, which also dropped to 37% to 1909. Gereformeerden made up a small minority in the district, though growing from 2% to 6%. The share of "Others" rose from 10% in 1888 to 16% in 1909, including 6% belonging to no denomination.

The district of Beverwijk was abolished upon the introduction of party-list proportional representation in 1918.

== Members ==
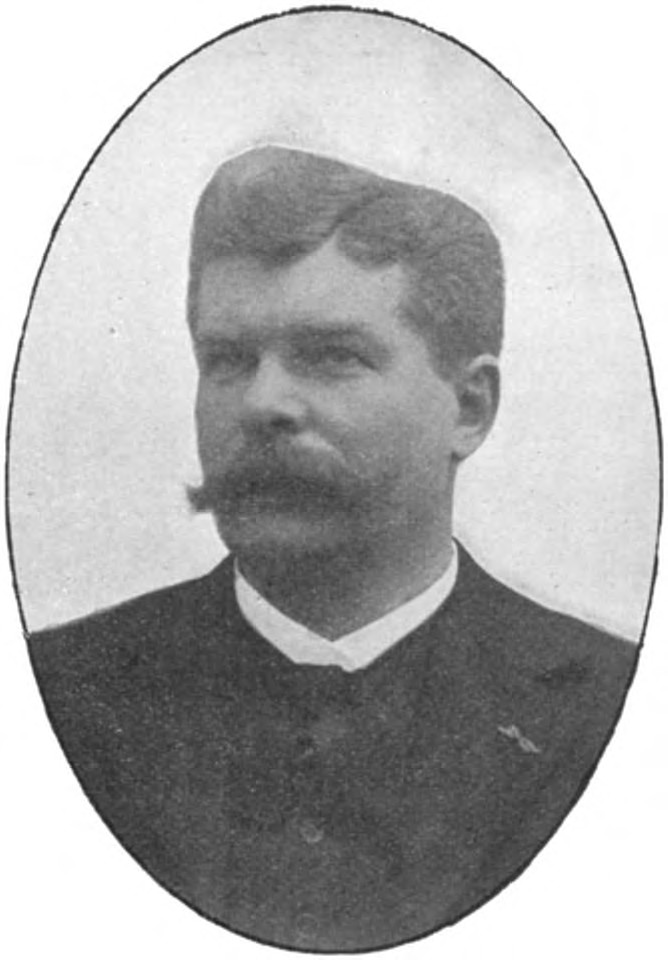
Willem Passtoors

Beverwijk was a highly contested district, with control alternating between the Liberals and Free-thinking Democrats (VD) on the parliamentary left and the Catholics (Ka) on the parliamentary right. The district's most notable representative was the Liberal interior minister Johannes Tak van Poortvliet, who was elected in 1897 but resigned his seat in 1901 after his election to the Senate. The subsequent by-election was won by the Catholic Willem Passtoors, who would go on to represent Beverwijk for the following twelve years, becoming its longest-serving representative.

Election	Member	Party	Ref
1888	J. W. G. Boreel van Hogelanden	Lib	
1891	J. W. G. Boreel van Hogelanden	Lib	
1893	T.L.M.H. Borret	Ka	
1894	T.L.M.H. Borret	Ka	
1897	Johannes Tak van Poortvliet	Lib	
1901	Willem Passtoors	Ka	
1901	Willem Passtoors	Ka	
1905	Willem Passtoors	Ka	
1909	Willem Passtoors	Ka	
1913	Leendert Nicolaas Roodenburg	VD	
1917	Leendert Nicolaas Roodenburg	VD	

== Election results ==
=== Elections in the 1880s ===
1888 general election: Beverwijk
Candidate	Party	First round		Second round	
Candidate	Party	Votes	%	Votes	%
J. A. N. Travaglino	Ka	1,456	46.40	1,592	47.71
J. W. G. Boreel van Hogelanden	Lib	1,454	46.34	1,745	52.29
Willem Hovy	AR	168	5.35		
Others		60	1.91		
Total		3,138	100.00	3,337	100.00
Valid votes		3,138	99.37	3,337	99.46
Invalid/blank votes		20	0.63	18	0.54
Total votes		3,158	100.00	3,355	100.00
Registered voters/turnout		3,500	90.23	3,500	95.86
Liberal gain					
Source: Kiesraad, Huygens Instituut

=== Elections in the 1890s ===
1891 general election: Beverwijk
Candidate	Party	First round		Second round	
Candidate	Party	Votes	%	Votes	%
J. W. G. Boreel van Hogelanden	Lib	778	26.07	1,733	53.21
W. Bos	Ka	753	25.23	1,524	46.79
Klaas de Boer	Rad	688	23.06		
J.J.H. Kervel	Ka	618	20.71		
Hendrik Waller	AR	78	2.61		
P.N. Engelberts	C	62	2.08		
Others		7	0.23		
Total		2,984	100.00	3,257	100.00
Valid votes		2,984	99.60	3,257	99.45
Invalid/blank votes		12	0.40	18	0.55
Total votes		2,996	100.00	3,275	100.00
Registered voters/turnout		3,640	82.31	3,640	89.97
Liberal hold					
Source: Kiesraad, Huygens Instituut

1893 Beverwijk by-election
Candidate	Party	First round		Second round	
Candidate	Party	Votes	%	Votes	%
J. van Loenen Martinet	Lib	698	26.91	1,277	48.44
T.L.M.H. Borret	Ka	691	26.64	1,359	51.56
Cornelis Hartsen	C	622	23.98		
Klaas de Boer	Rad	335	12.91		
Hendrik Waller	AR	229	8.83		
Others		19	0.73		
Total		2,594	100.00	2,636	100.00
Valid votes		2,594	98.93	2,636	98.54
Invalid/blank votes		28	1.07	39	1.46
Total votes		2,622	100.00	2,675	100.00
Registered voters/turnout		3,718	70.52	3,718	71.95
Catholic gain					
Source: Kiesraad, Huygens Instituut

1894 general election: Beverwijk
Candidate	Party	First round		Second round	
Candidate	Party	Votes	%	Votes	%
T.L.M.H. Borret	Ka	1,261	48.33	1,510	50.05
J. van Loenen Martinet	Lib	1,043	39.98	1,507	49.95
F.W.C.H. van Tuyll van Serooskerken	Lib	270	10.35		
Others		35	1.34		
Total		2,609	100.00	3,017	100.00
Valid votes		2,609	98.86	3,017	98.40
Invalid/blank votes		30	1.14	49	1.60
Total votes		2,639	100.00	3,066	100.00
Registered voters/turnout		3,718	70.98	3,718	82.46
Catholic hold					
Source: Kiesraad, Huygens Instituut

1897 general election: Beverwijk
Candidate	Party	First round		Second round	
Candidate	Party	Votes	%	Votes	%
T.L.M.H. Borret	Ka	2,905	48.54	3,137	49.15
Johannes Tak van Poortvliet	Lib	2,537	42.39	3,246	50.85
P. Vermeulen	AR	344	5.75		
W. Bax	SDAP	199	3.32		
Total		5,985	100.00	6,383	100.00
Valid votes		5,985	98.89	6,383	99.50
Invalid/blank votes		67	1.11	32	0.50
Total votes		6,052	100.00	6,415	100.00
Registered voters/turnout		6,719	90.07	6,719	95.48
Liberal gain					
Source: Kiesraad, Huygens Instituut

=== Elections in the 1900s ===
1901 Beverwijk by-election
Candidate	Party	Votes	%
Willem Passtoors	Ka	2,977	51.42
Jacob Theodoor Cremer	Lib	2,549	44.02
D. de Clercq		264	4.56
Total		5,790	100.00
Valid votes		5,790	98.60
Invalid/blank votes		82	1.40
Total votes		5,872	100.00
Registered voters/turnout		7,104	82.66
Catholic gain			
Source: Kiesraad, Huygens Instituut

1901 general election: Beverwijk
Candidate	Party	Votes	%
Willem Passtoors	Ka	3,885	50.46
Jacob Theodoor Cremer	VD	3,814	49.54
Total		7,699	100.00
Valid votes		7,699	99.28
Invalid/blank votes		56	0.72
Total votes		7,755	100.00
Registered voters/turnout		8,381	92.53
Catholic hold			
Source: Kiesraad, Huygens Instituut

1905 general election: Beverwijk
Candidate	Party	Votes	%
Willem Passtoors	Ka	5,374	53.41
Joseph Limburg	VD	3,889	38.65
Jan Gerritzen	SDAP	490	4.87
O. Kamerlingh Onnes	VL	191	1.90
Andries Staalman	CD	118	1.17
Total		10,062	100.00
Valid votes		10,062	98.69
Invalid/blank votes		134	1.31
Total votes		10,196	100.00
Registered voters/turnout		11,021	92.51
Catholic hold			
Source: Kiesraad, Huygens Instituut

1909 general election: Beverwijk
Candidate	Party	Votes	%
Willem Passtoors	Ka	6,228	55.53
A. Schucking Kool	VD	2,744	24.47
J.H.W.Q. ter Spill	VL	1,443	12.87
Jan van Leeuwen	SDAP	800	7.13
Total		11,215	100.00
Valid votes		11,215	98.67
Invalid/blank votes		151	1.33
Total votes		11,366	100.00
Registered voters/turnout		13,306	85.42
Catholic hold			
Source: Kiesraad, Huygens Instituut

=== Elections in the 1910s ===
1913 general election: Beverwijk
Candidate	Party	First round		Second round	
Candidate	Party	Votes	%	Votes	%
Willem Passtoors	Ka	6,875	46.47	6,973	46.93
L.N. Roodenburg	VD	5,888	39.80	7,885	53.07
A. Nagtzaam	SDAP	1,812	12.25		
A. van der Flier G.Jzn.	CS	218	1.47		
Total		14,793	100.00	14,858	100.00
Valid votes		14,793	99.29	14,858	99.62
Invalid/blank votes		106	0.71	56	0.38
Total votes		14,899	100.00	14,914	100.00
Registered voters/turnout		15,864	93.92	15,864	94.01
Free-thinking Democratic gain					
Source: Kiesraad, Huygens Instituut

1917 general election: Beverwijk
Candidate	Party	Votes	%
L.N. Roodenburg	VD	5,145	85.78
Louis de Visser	SDP	853	14.22
Total		5,998	100.00
Valid votes		5,998	97.56
Invalid/blank votes		150	2.44
Total votes		6,148	100.00
Registered voters/turnout		18,099	33.97
Free-thinking Democratic hold			
Source: Kiesraad, Huygens Instituut
