= Schoterland (electoral district) =

Extinct electoral district in the Netherlands

Schoterland was an electoral district of the House of Representatives in the Netherlands from 1888 to 1918.

== Profile ==
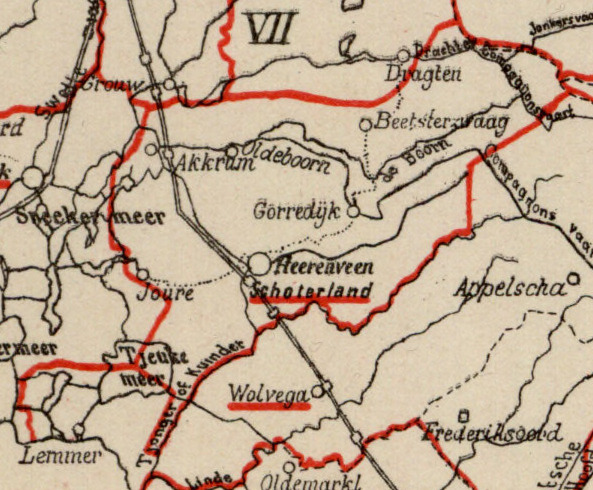
Schoterland in 1888

The electoral district of Schoterland was created in 1888 out of part of the Sneek district, which was reduced from three seats to one. Schoterland's boundaries remained the same throughout the electoral district's existence. Fully located in the province of Friesland, it included the rural municipalities of Aengwirden, Haskerland, Opsterland, Schoterland and Utingeradeel. It was a predominantly agricultural district.

The district's population increased slightly during its existence, from 45,522 in 1888 to 49,011 in 1909. A majority ranging from 59% to 68% of the population was Reformed, with around 10 to 12% being Gereformeerd. The proportion of Mennonites dropped from 8.7% in 1888 to 6.5% in 1909. Catholics made up just 3% of the population. A substantial minority of the population was nondenominational, peaking at 19.6% in 1909.

The district of Schoterland was abolished upon the introduction of party-list proportional representation in 1918.

== Members ==
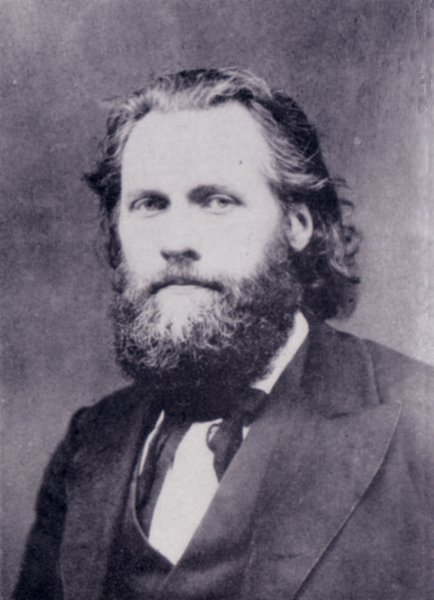
Ferdinand Domela Nieuwenhuis

Schoterland was a left-wing, so-called "red district", electing only candidates from the parliamentary left throughout its existence. In its first election, the district elected Ferdinand Domela Nieuwenhuis, the first socialist member of the House of Representatives. In 1891, the radical Liberal Willem Treub defeated Domela Nieuwenhuis, but did not take his seat because another radical was elected in a different district, and Treub believed the socialists should be represented in parliament as well. Nevertheless, the subsequent by-election was won by another Liberal, Hendrik Pyttersen. In 1897, Pyttersen was defeated by the independent socialist candidate Geert van der Zwaag, who was reelected in 1901 and 1905 with the support of the Social Democratic Workers' Party (SDAP), although he never became a member of the SDAP.

In 1909, Theo de Meester won the district of Schoterland as well as the district of Den Helder. He opted to represent Den Helder, thus triggering another by-election in Schoterland.

Election	Member	Party	Ref
1888	Ferdinand Domela Nieuwenhuis	Soc	
1891	Willem Treub	Lib	
1891	Hendrik Pyttersen	Lib	
1894	Hendrik Pyttersen	Lib	
1897	Geert van der Zwaag	Ind.	
1901	Geert van der Zwaag	Ind.	
1905	Geert van der Zwaag	Ind.	
1909	Theo de Meester	Lib	
1909	Joseph Limburg	VD	
1913	Maup Mendels	SDAP	
1917	Maup Mendels	SDAP	

== Election results ==
=== Elections in the 1880s ===
1888 general election: Schoterland
Candidate	Party	First round		Second round	
Candidate	Party	Votes	%	Votes	%
Bernardus Hermanus Heldt	Lib	1,062	43.61	1,036	47.03
Ferdinand Domela Nieuwenhuis	Soc	769	31.58	1,167	52.97
Luutzen de Vries	AR	587	24.11		
Others		17	0.70		
Total		2,435	100.00	2,203	100.00
Valid votes		2,435	99.59	2,203	99.06
Invalid/blank votes		10	0.41	21	0.94
Total votes		2,445	100.00	2,224	100.00
Registered voters/turnout		2,959	82.63	2,959	75.16
Socialist gain					
Source: Kiesraad, Huygens Instituut

=== Elections in the 1890s ===
1891 general election: Schoterland
Candidate	Party	First round		Second round	
Candidate	Party	Votes	%	Votes	%
Ferdinand Domela Nieuwenhuis	Soc	748	33.42	919	45.20
Willem Treub	Lib	607	27.12	1,114	54.80
Ulrich Herman Huber	AR	587	26.23		
J.C. van den Berg	Lib	294	13.14		
Others		2	0.09		
Total		2,238	100.00	2,033	100.00
Valid votes		2,238	98.98	2,033	97.55
Invalid/blank votes		23	1.02	51	2.45
Total votes		2,261	100.00	2,084	100.00
Registered voters/turnout		2,861	79.03	2,861	72.84
Liberal gain					
Source: Kiesraad, Huygens Instituut (1, 2)

1891 Schoterland by-election
Candidate	Party	First round		Second round	
Candidate	Party	Votes	%	Votes	%
Hendrik Pyttersen	Lib	800	44.74	1,106	51.01
Pieter van Vliet	AR	771	43.12	1,062	48.99
Ferdinand Domela Nieuwenhuis	Soc	215	12.02		
Others		2	0.11		
Total		1,788	100.00	2,168	100.00
Valid votes		1,788	99.33	2,168	98.59
Invalid/blank votes		12	0.67	31	1.41
Total votes		1,800	100.00	2,199	100.00
Registered voters/turnout		2,861	62.92	2,861	76.86
Liberal hold					
Source: Kiesraad, Huygens Instituut (1, 2)

1894 general election: Schoterland
Candidate	Party	Votes	%
Hendrik Pyttersen	Lib	834	91.65
Geert van der Zwaag	Rad	76	8.35
Total		910	100.00
Valid votes		910	95.29
Invalid/blank votes		45	4.71
Total votes		955	100.00
Registered voters/turnout		2,832	33.72
Liberal hold			
Source: Kiesraad, Huygens Instituut

1897 general election: Schoterland
Candidate	Party	First round		Second round	
Candidate	Party	Votes	%	Votes	%
Geert van der Zwaag	Independent	1,344	39.15	1,941	54.04
Hendrik Pyttersen	Lib	994	28.95	1,651	45.96
Abraham Kuyper	AR	861	25.08		
Herman Verkouteren	CHK	234	6.82		
Total		3,433	100.00	3,592	100.00
Valid votes		3,433	98.23	3,592	98.93
Invalid/blank votes		62	1.77	39	1.07
Total votes		3,495	100.00	3,631	100.00
Registered voters/turnout		5,584	62.59	5,584	65.03
Independent gain					
Source: Kiesraad, Huygens Instituut (1, 2)

=== Elections in the 1900s ===
1901 general election: Schoterland
Candidate	Party	First round		Second round	
Candidate	Party	Votes	%	Votes	%
Geert van der Zwaag	Independent	1,704	46.68	2,168	59.94
Jan Schokking	FCH	1,012	27.73	1,449	40.06
J.P. Engelman	Lib	934	25.59		
Total		3,650	100.00	3,617	100.00
Valid votes		3,650	97.99	3,617	99.10
Invalid/blank votes		75	2.01	33	0.90
Total votes		3,725	100.00	3,650	100.00
Registered voters/turnout		5,184	71.86	5,184	70.41
Independent hold					
Source: Kiesraad, Huygens Instituut (1, 2)

1905 general election: Schoterland
Candidate	Party	First round		Second round	
Candidate	Party	Votes	%	Votes	%
Geert van der Zwaag	Independent	2,085	43.83	3,172	63.89
J. Huizinga	AR	1,342	28.21	1,793	36.11
Carel Victor Gerritsen	VD	1,330	27.96		
Total		4,757	100.00	4,965	100.00
Valid votes		4,757	98.75	4,965	99.12
Invalid/blank votes		60	1.25	44	0.88
Total votes		4,817	100.00	5,009	100.00
Registered voters/turnout		6,365	75.68	6,365	78.70
Independent hold					
Source: Kiesraad, Huygens Instituut (1, 2)

1909 general election: Schoterland
Candidate	Party	First round		Second round	
Candidate	Party	Votes	%	Votes	%
J.A. Bergmeyer	SDAP	1,756	36.46	2,125	45.31
Theo de Meester	Lib	1,547	32.12	2,565	54.69
Jan Ankerman	CHU	1,513	31.42		
Total		4,816	100.00	4,690	100.00
Valid votes		4,816	99.65	4,690	99.77
Invalid/blank votes		17	0.35	11	0.23
Total votes		4,833	100.00	4,701	100.00
Registered voters/turnout		6,707	72.06	6,707	70.09
Liberal gain					
Source: Kiesraad, Huygens Instituut (1, 2)

1909 Schoterland by-election
Candidate	Party	Votes	%
Joseph Limburg	VD	2,467	52.65
J.A. Bergmeyer	SDAP	2,219	47.35
Total		4,686	100.00
Valid votes		4,686	99.81
Invalid/blank votes		9	0.19
Total votes		4,695	100.00
Registered voters/turnout		6,707	70.00
Free-thinking Democratic gain			
Source: Kiesraad, Huygens Instituut

=== Elections in the 1910s ===
1913 general election: Schoterland
Candidate	Party	First round		Second round	
Candidate	Party	Votes	%	Votes	%
Maup Mendels	SDAP	2,859	47.22	3,200	58.76
Joseph Limburg	VD	1,733	28.62	2,246	41.24
Chris Smeenk	AR	1,463	24.16		
Total		6,055	100.00	5,446	100.00
Valid votes		6,055	99.26	5,446	99.45
Invalid/blank votes		45	0.74	30	0.55
Total votes		6,100	100.00	5,476	100.00
Registered voters/turnout		7,812	78.08	7,812	70.10
SDAP gain					
Source: Kiesraad, Huygens Instituut (1, 2)

1917 general election: Schoterland
Candidate	Party	Votes	%
Maup Mendels	SDAP	2,135	78.75
H.J. Rijsewijk	SDP	576	21.25
Total		2,711	100.00
Valid votes		2,711	98.73
Invalid/blank votes		35	1.27
Total votes		2,746	100.00
Registered voters/turnout		8,751	31.38
SDAP hold			
Source: Kiesraad, Huygens Instituut
