= Van Tienhoven cabinet =

Cabinet of the Netherlands, 1891 to 1894

- Cabinet of the Netherlands
- Date formed: 21 August 1891
- Date dissolved: 9 May 1894 (Demissionary from 24 April 1894)

People and organisations
- Head of state: Queen Wilhelmina
- Head of government: Gijsbert van Tienhoven
- Deputy head of government: Johannes Tak van Poortvliet (Unofficially)
- No. of ministers: 8
- Ministers removed: 1
- Member party: Liberal Union (LU); Independent Liberals (I)
- Status in legislature: Right-wing Majority government

History
- Election: 1891 election
- Outgoing election: 1894 election
- Legislature terms: 1891–1894
- Predecessor: Mackay cabinet
- Successor: Röell cabinet

The Van Tienhoven cabinet was the cabinet of the Netherlands from 21 August 1891 until 9 May 1894. The cabinet was formed by the Liberal Union (LU) and Independent Liberals (I) after the election of 1891. The right-wing cabinet was a majority government in the House of Representatives. Independent Classical Liberal Gijsbert van Tienhoven was chairman of the Council of Ministers.

== Cabinet Members ==
Ministers		Title/Ministry		Term of office	Party
Gijsbert van Tienhoven	Gijsbert van Tienhoven (1841–1914)	Prime Minister		21 August 1891 – 21 March 1894^{[Res]}	Independent; Liberal (Classical Liberal)
Gijsbert van Tienhoven	Gijsbert van Tienhoven (1841–1914)	Minister	Foreign Affairs	21 August 1891 – 21 March 1894^{[Res]}	Independent; Liberal (Classical Liberal)
Joannes Coenraad Jansen	Joannes Coenraad; Jansen (1840–1925)	Minister	Foreign Affairs	21 March 1894 – 9 May 1894^{[Ad interim]}	Liberal Union
Johannes Tak van Poortvliet	Johannes Tak van Poortvliet (1839–1904)	Minister	Interior	21 August 1891 – 9 May 1894	Liberal Union
Nicolaas Pierson	Nicolaas Pierson (1836–1909)	Minister	Finance	21 August 1891 – 9 May 1894	Liberal Union
Hendrik Jan Smidt	Hendrik Jan Smidt (1831–1917)	Minister	Justice	21 August 1891 – 9 May 1894	Liberal Union
Cornelis Lely	Cornelis Lely (1860–1945)	Minister	Water Management, Commerce and Industry	21 August 1891 – 9 May 1894	Liberal Union
Lodewijk Seyffardt	Colonel; Lodewijk Seyffardt (1840–1909)	Minister	War	21 August 1891 – 9 May 1894	Independent; Liberal (Social Liberal)
Joannes Coenraad Jansen	Joannes Coenraad; Jansen (1840–1925)	Minister	Navy	21 August 1891 – 9 May 1894	Liberal Union
Willem van Dedem	Baron; Willem van Dedem (1839–1895)	Minister	Colonial Affairs	21 August 1891 – 9 May 1894	Liberal Union
