= 1888 Dutch general election =

- 6 March 1888 (first round); 20 March 1888 (second round)
- All 100 seats in the House of Representatives; 51 seats needed for a majority
- Turnout: 81.41% (▲26.27pp)
Party	Leader	Vote %	Seats	+/–
LU	Hendrik Goeman Borgesius	40.72	45	−3
ARP	Abraham Kuyper	30.43	27	+8
Catholic		21.55	26	+7
SDB	Ferdinand Domela Nieuwenhuis	0.68	1	+1
Conservative	Rutger Jan Schimmelpenninck van Nijenhuis		1	+1
This lists parties that won seats. See the complete results below.
Results by constituency
Cabinet before	Cabinet after
Jan Heemskerk cabinet Conservative–Liberal	Mackay cabinet Coalition

General elections were held in the Netherlands on 6 March 1888, with a second round in 25 constituencies on 20 March. The Liberal Union emerged as the largest party, winning 46 of the 100 seats in the House of Representatives.

== Background ==
This was the first election held after the constitutional revision of 1887, achieved by Minister of the Interior Jan Heemskerk, which had several effects on the parliamentary system. Firstly, this revision fixed the number of seats in the House of Representatives at 100. Secondly, it abolished multi-seat electoral districts except in large cities in favour of single-seat districts, thus allowing for better representation of geographically concentrated political minorities. Thirdly, the revision ensured all members of the House of Representatives would be elected simultaneously every four years, replacing the previous system of staggered elections. Finally, the change greatly extended suffrage and allowed for gradual further extension by law.

The election was won by the confessional parties, leading to the first Coalition government, combining Anti-Revolutionaries and Catholics, led by Æneas, Baron Mackay, thus heralding a period of Antithesis as championed by Abraham Kuyper, in which government alternated between secular liberals on the left and confessional Anti-Revolutionaries and Catholics on the right. The election also saw the first socialist elected into the House of Representatives, with Ferdinand Domela Nieuwenhuis, leader of the Social Democratic League, being elected in a rural Frisian district.

== Electoral system ==
Of the 100 seats in the House of Representatives, 79 were elected in single-member constituencies using the two-round system.

The other 21 were elected using two-round plurality block voting in 5 constituencies from 2 to 9 seats. To be elected in the first round, a candidate had to reach an electoral threshold of 50% of the number of valid votes cast, divided by the number of seats up for election in the district.

== Results ==
Party	First round			Second round			Total seats	+/–
Party	Votes	%	Seats	Votes	%	Seats	Total seats	+/–
Liberal Union	195,322	48.93	33	44,662	49.48	12	45	–3
Anti-Revolutionary Party	97,848	24.51	20	22,400	24.81	7	27	+8
Catholics	76,521	19.17	20	20,138	22.31	6	26	+7
Radicals	11,313	2.83	0				0	0
Social Democratic League	4,016	1.01	0	1,167	1.29	1	1	+1
Other parties	14,149	3.54	1	1,901	2.11	0	1	+1
Total	399,169	100.00	74	90,268	100.00	26	100	0
Valid votes	236,310	98.95		83,845	99.13			
Invalid votes	441	0.18		134	0.16			
Blank votes	2,059	0.86		599	0.71			
Total votes	238,810	100.00		84,578	100.00			
Registered voters/turnout	293,339	81.41		110,430	76.59			
Source: Kiesraad, Huygens

=== By district ===
Social Democratic Liberal Conservative Anti-Revolutionary Catholic

District results for the Dutch general election, 1888
District	Winner	Ref.
Alkmaar	Willem van der Kaay	
Almelo	Willem Cremers	
Amersfoort	Jan Schimmelpenninck van der Oye	
Amsterdam	Jacob Theodoor Cremer	
Amsterdam	Adriaan Gildemeester	
Amsterdam	Johan George Gleichman	
Amsterdam	Abraham Hartogh	
Amsterdam	Bernardus Hermanus Heldt	
Amsterdam	Arnold Kerdijk	
Amsterdam	Jan Rutgers van Rozenburg	
Amsterdam	Johannes Tak van Poortvliet	
Amsterdam	Willem Hendrik de Beaufort	
Apeldoorn	Frederik van Bylandt	
Appingedam	Jan Schepel	
Arnhem	Willem Rooseboom	
Assen	Warmold Albertinus van der Feltz	
Bergen op Zoom	Lambert de Ram	
Bergum	Okke Tietes Bosgra	
Beverwijk	Jacob Boreel van Hogelanden	
Bodegraven	Simon van Velzen	
Breda	Louis Michiels van Verduynen	
Breukelen	Willem Jan Roijaards van den Ham	
Brielle	Gerardus Jacobus Goekoop	
Delft	Jan Christiaan Fabius	
Den Bosch	Pierre Guillaume Jean van der Schrieck	
Den Haag	Lodewijk Gerard Greeve	
Den Haag	Lodewijk van Kempen	
Den Haag	Rutger Jan Schimmelpenninck	
Den Helder	Simon Taco Land	
Deventer	Albertus van Delden	
Doetinchem	Jean Gustave Stanislas Bevers	
Dokkum	Ulrich Herman Huber	
Dordrecht	Johannes Barendinus van Osenbruggen	
Druten	Frederic Reekers	
Ede	Levinus Keuchenius	
Eindhoven	Antonius van Baar	
Elst	Godert Willem van Dedem	
Emmen	Hendrik Jan Smidt	
Enkhuizen	Dirk Visser van Hazerswoude	
Enschede	Willem Jacob Geertsema	
Franeker	Franciscus Lieftinck	
Goes	Alexander de Savornin Lohman	
Gorinchem	Hendrik Seret	
Gouda	Karel Antonie Godin de Beaufort	
Grave	Jan Harte van Tecklenburg	
Groningen	Samuel van Houten	
Groningen	Jacob Dirk Veegens	
Gulpen	Leonard Ruland	
Haarlem	Antonie Farncombe Sanders	
Haarlemmermeer	Frederic Reekers	
Harlingen	Walle Melis Oppedijk	
Helmond	Petrus Vermeulen	
Hilversum	Theodoor Philip Mackay	
Hontenisse	Felix Walter	
Hoorn	Willem Karel van Dedem	
Kampen	Titus van Asch van Wijck	
Katwijk	Johannes Hendricus Donner	
Leeuwarden	Johannis Zaaijer	
Leiden	Hendrik Johannes Bool	
Lochem	Alex Schimmelpenninck van der Oye	
Loosduinen	Arnoldus van Berckel	
Maastricht	Gustave Ruijs van Beerenbroek	
Meppel	Harm Smeenge	
Middelburg	Christiaan Lucasse	
Nijmegen	Anthonie Ernst Reuther	
Ommen	Jan van Alphen	
Oostburg	Nicolaas Glinderman	
Oosterhout	Theodorus Borret	
Rheden	Maximilien Kolkman	
Ridderkerk	Theo Heemskerk	
Roermond	Hubert Joachim Brouwers	
Rotterdam	Henry David Levyssohn Norman	
Rotterdam	Rudolf Pieter Mees	
Rotterdam	George Hermann Hintzen	
Rotterdam	Herman Cornelis Verniers van der Loeff	
Rotterdam	Willem Adriaan Viruly Verbrugge	
Schiedam	Jacob Gerard Patijn	
Schoterland	Ferdinand Domela Nieuwenhuis	
Sittard	Jerôme Lambrechts	
Sliedrecht	Barthold de Geer van Jutphaas	
Sneek	Willem Gerard Brantsen van de Zijp	
Steenwijk	Gerard Beelaerts van Blokland	
Tiel	Herman Jacob Dijckmeester	
Tilburg	Bernardus Marie Bahlmann	
Utrecht	Joan Röell	
Utrecht	August Seyffardt	
Veendam	Hendrik Goeman Borgesius	
Veghel	Bernardus van Vlijmen	
Venlo	Leopold Haffmans	
Waalwijk	Antonius Franciscus Vos de Wael	
Weert	Jean Clercx	
Wijk bij Duurstede	Herman Schaepman	
Winschoten	Derk de Ruiter Zijlker	
Wolvega	Ruurd Klazer Okma	
Zaandam	Willem de Meijier	
Zevenbergen	Joannes van Nunen	
Zierikzee	Jacob Johan van Kerkwijk	
Zuidhorn	Eppo Cremers	
Zutphen	Derck Engelberts	
Zwolle	Alexander van Dedem	
