= Kornelis ter Laan =

Dutch politician and linguist

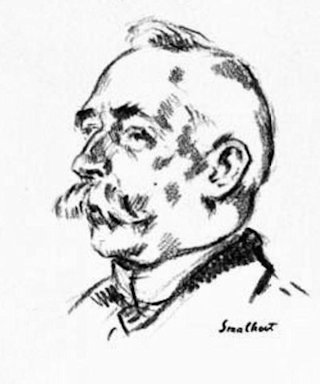
- Portrait of K. ter Laan by Elie Smalhout

Member of the House of Representatives for Hoogezand
- In office 1901–1909
- Preceded by: Jacob Dirk Veegens
- Succeeded by: Pieter Rink

Member of the House of Representatives for The Hague I
- In office 1909–1918
- Preceded by: Joseph Limburg
- Succeeded by: District abolished

Personal details
- Born: 8 July 1871; Slochteren, Netherlands
- Died: 6 March 1963 (aged 91); Utrecht, Netherlands
- Political party: Social Democratic Workers' Party
- Relatives: Jan ter Laan (brother)

Kornelis ter Laan (Gronings: Knelis ter Loan) (8 July 1871 – 6 March 1963), also referred to as Kees ter Laan and Klaas ter Laan, was a Dutch politician and linguist. He published as K. ter Laan.

== Biography ==
Ter Laan was born on 8 July 1871 in Slochteren as the son of Remco ter Laan and his wife Metje Buurman. Jan ter Laan was his younger brother. His father used to be a day laborer, but had managed to get his own farm. Their income was just high enough to pay for his education at the Hogere burgerschool in Sappemeer. After additional lessons, he was able to become teacher at a school in Noordbroek.

At a young age, Ter Laan became interested in socialism. He joined the Social Democratic League, but left when the league chose an anti-parliamentary way. He joined the Social Democratic Workers' Party. In 1901, he was elected member of the House of Representatives of the Netherlands by the district of Hoogezand. He would stay member of the House of Representatives until 1937. From 1905 to 1918, he was also a councillor in The Hague and was the first socialist of The Hague's city council. He was appointed the first social democrat mayor of Zaandam in 1914 by the Cabinet Cort van der Linden. he would remain mayor until 1937.

He married Ida Groen on 27 April 1895. They had two sons and a daughter together. Ter Laan died on 6 March 1963 in Utrecht.

== Bibliography ==
Ter Laan is known for his books about the dialect of Groningen, Gronings.

- De riekdom van de Grunneger toal (1924)
- Groninger overleveringen (2 delen, 1928, 1930)
- Nederlandse overleveringen (2 delen, 1930)
- Nieuw Groninger Woordenboek (1929)
- Encyclopedisch woordenboek voor Groot-Nederland (1937)
- Groningen voor honderd jaar (1937)
- Joodse overleveringen (1937)
- Woordenboek van de vaderlandse geschiedenis (1939)
- Beknopte Nederlandse Encyclopedie (1941, 1947, 1949)
- Letterkundig woordenboek (1941)
- Aardrijkskundig woordenboek van Nederland (1942, 1948)
- Folkloristisch woordenboek (1949)
- Nederlandse spreekwoorden, spreuken en zegswijzen (1950)
- Hoezen van Gruindiek (1951)
- K. ter Laan's Multatuli-Encyclopedie (ed. Chantal Keijsper, posthumously published in 1995)

House of Representatives of the Netherlands
Preceded by Jacob Dirk Veegens	Member for Hoogezand; 1901–1909	Succeeded by Pieter Rink
Preceded by Joseph Limburg	Member for The Hague I 1909–1918	District abolished
