= The Hague I =

The Hague I was an electoral district of the House of Representatives in the Netherlands from 1848 to 1850, and again from 1897 to 1918.

== Profile ==
The Hague I was created as a provisional single-member district in 1848, and included the neighbourhoods A through K and a part of the neighbourhood S in the municipality of The Hague, as well as the neighbouring municipalities of 's-Gravenzande, Loosduinen and Monster. It was abolished again in 1850, when it merged with the district of The Hague II to form the two-member district of The Hague. The district was reconstituted in 1897, when The Hague was split into three single-member districts. This district comprised the southeastern third of what was then the municipality of The Hague, including what is today the southern half of Centrum and small parts of Laak and Escamp.

Due to the area's urban development in the late 19th and early 20th century, The Hague I's electorate grew substantially during its second iteration, from 5,025 in 1897 to 16,470 to 1917.

The district of The Hague I was abolished upon the introduction of party-list proportional representation in 1918.

== Members ==
=== First creation ===
Willem Boreel van Hogelanden was elected in the district of The Hague I in the inaugural 1848 election. Though political parties did not exist at this time, Boreel is classified as a "pragmatic" liberal.

Election	Member	Party	Ref.
1848	Willem Boreel van Hogelanden	Independent	

=== Second creation ===
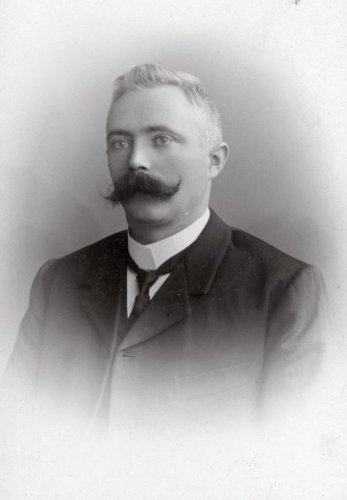
Kornelis ter Laan in 1909

During its second iteration, The Hague I was a contested seat. The district elected the Anti-Revolutionary Johannes Krap in 1897, and he was narrowly re-elected in 1901, leading his second-round opponent with just eight votes. In 1905, however, he lost re-election to Joseph Limburg, a Free-thinking Democrat. Limburg in turn failed to be re-elected in 1909, when Kornelis ter Laan, a member of the Social Democratic Workers' Party, won the district, defeating Krap in the second round. Ter Laan was easily re-elected in 1913 and in 1917, representing the district until its abolition in 1918 and becoming its longest-serving representative.

Election	Member	Party	Ref.
1897	Johannes Krap	AR	
1901	Johannes Krap	AR	
1905	Joseph Limburg	VD	
1909	Kornelis ter Laan	SDAP	
1913	Kornelis ter Laan	SDAP	
1917	Kornelis ter Laan	SDAP	

== Election results ==
=== Elections in the 1840s ===
1848 general election: The Hague I
Candidate	Party	Votes	%
Willem Boreel van Hogelanden	Independent	347	59.01
Dirk Donker Curtius	Independent	182	30.95
Gerardus Wouter Verweij Mejan	Independent	15	2.55
Æneas Mackay	Independent	12	2.04
Pieter Carel Schooneveld	Independent	7	1.19
Others		25	4.25
Total		588	100.00
Valid votes		588	99.83
Invalid/blank votes		1	0.17
Total votes		589	100.00
Registered voters/turnout		693	84.99
Independent gain			
Source: Electoral Council, Huygens Institute

=== Elections in the 1890s ===
1897 general election: The Hague I
Candidate	Party	Votes	%
Johannes Krap	AR	1,967	51.60
Hendrik Jan Smidt	Lib	1,026	26.92
F. Mol	Rad	507	13.30
Joan Röell	VL	266	6.98
J.P. Crombet	Independent	46	1.21
Total		3,812	100.00
Valid votes		3,812	99.01
Invalid/blank votes		38	0.99
Total votes		3,850	100.00
Registered voters/turnout		5,025	76.62
Anti-Revolutionary gain			
Source: Electoral Council, Huygens Institute

=== Elections in the 1900s ===
1901 general election: The Hague I
Candidate	Party	First round		Second round	
Candidate	Party	Votes	%	Votes	%
Johannes Krap	AR	1,643	40.51	2,172	50.09
Willem Dolk	Lib	1,307	32.22	2,164	49.91
J.A. Bergmeyer	SDAP	681	16.79		
D. van Houten	VL	344	8.48		
F. Mol	VD	81	2.00		
Total		4,056	100.00	4,336	100.00
Valid votes		4,056	97.76	4,336	99.09
Invalid/blank votes		93	2.24	40	0.91
Total votes		4,149	100.00	4,376	100.00
Registered voters/turnout		6,345	65.39	6,345	68.97
Anti-Revolutionary hold					
Source: Electoral Council, Huygens Institute

1905 general election: The Hague I
Candidate	Party	First round		Second round	
Candidate	Party	Votes	%	Votes	%
Johannes Krap	AR	2,736	40.92	3,131	43.29
Joseph Limburg	VD	2,267	33.90	4,102	56.71
J.A. Bergmeyer	SDAP	1,370	20.49		
J.H. Valckenier Kips	VL	291	4.35		
T.B.V. Dill	CD	23	0.34		
Total		6,687	100.00	7,233	100.00
Valid votes		6,687	97.99	7,233	99.31
Invalid/blank votes		137	2.01	50	0.69
Total votes		6,824	100.00	7,283	100.00
Registered voters/turnout		8,853	77.08	8,853	82.27
Free-thinking Democratic gain					
Source: Electoral Council, Huygens Institute

1909 general election: The Hague I
Candidate	Party	First round		Second round	
Candidate	Party	Votes	%	Votes	%
Johannes Krap	AR	3,035	42.02	3,919	47.30
Kornelis ter Laan	SDAP	2,199	30.45	4,367	52.70
Joseph Limburg	VD	1,988	27.53		
Total		7,222	100.00	8,286	100.00
Valid votes		7,222	98.31	8,286	98.88
Invalid/blank votes		124	1.69	94	1.12
Total votes		7,346	100.00	8,380	100.00
Registered voters/turnout		10,950	67.09	10,950	76.53
Social Democratic Workers' Party gain					
Source: Electoral Council, Huygens Institute

=== Elections in the 1910s ===
1913 general election: The Hague I
Candidate	Party	First round		Second round	
Candidate	Party	Votes	%	Votes	%
Kornelis ter Laan	SDAP	4,836	45.37	6,329	60.42
Chris Smeenk	AR	3,682	34.55	4,146	39.58
E. Deen	VD	1,933	18.14		
A. ten Bosch N.Jzn.	Independent	164	1.54		
Louis de Visser	SDP	43	0.40		
Total		10,658	100.00	10,475	100.00
Valid votes		10,658	98.38	10,475	99.18
Invalid/blank votes		176	1.62	87	0.82
Total votes		10,834	100.00	10,562	100.00
Registered voters/turnout		13,029	83.15	13,029	81.07
Social Democratic Workers' Party hold					
Source: Electoral Council, Huygens Institute

1917 general election: The Hague I
Candidate	Party	Votes	%
Kornelis ter Laan	SDAP	3,755	80.80
H.L. Israëls	AG	584	12.57
Louis de Visser	SDP	308	6.63
Total		4,647	100.00
Valid votes		4,647	95.05
Invalid/blank votes		242	4.95
Total votes		4,889	100.00
Registered voters/turnout		16,470	29.68
Social Democratic Workers' Party hold			
Source: Electoral Council, Huygens Institute
