= Maup Mendels =

Dutch politician (1868-1944)

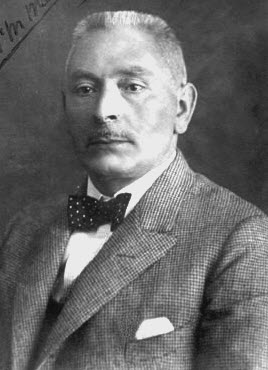
- Maup Mendels

Member of the House of Representatives
- In office 16 September 1913 – 17 September 1918
- Preceded by: Joseph Limburg
- Constituency: Schoterland

Member of the Senate
- In office 17 September 1919 – 8 June 1937

Personal details
- Born: Maurits Mendels; 25 December 1868 The Hague
- Died: 3 June 1944 (aged 75) Theresienstadt concentration camp
- Party: SDAP
- Other political affiliations: SDP (1909)
- Spouse: Henriette Sara Stokvis (m. 1896)
- Children: 1
- Education: University of Amsterdam

Maurits "Maup" Mendels (25 December 1868 - 3 June 1944) was a Dutch lawyer and politician. He was a member of the House of Representatives from 1913 to 1918 and a member of the Senate from 1918 to 1937 for the Social Democratic Workers' Party (SDAP).

== Early life ==
Maup Mendels was born on 25 December 1868 in The Hague. He grew up in a religiously observant Jewish family, but he would abandon his faith later in life. He studied law at the University of Amsterdam, graduating in 1894, after which he became a lawyer in Leiden, and started writing for various local newspapers. In 1896, he married Henriette Sara Stokvis, with whom he would have one daughter. In 1899, Mendels joined the Social Democratic Workers' Party (SDAP), and became an editor for the social democratic newspaper Het Volk the year after.

== Political career ==
Mendels began his political career in the 1901 Dutch general election by unsuccessfully running as the SDAP candidate in the Zaandam district. He served in the municipal council of Zaandam from 1904 to 1906, and became a member of the provincial assembly of Utrecht in the late 1900s. He was also elected to the North Holland provincial assembly in 1913, serving until 1931 with a four-year break between 1919 and 1923.

Mendels joined the SDAP leadership in 1905. Ideologically affiliated with the revolutionary left-wing of the SDAP, when the party expelled the editors of the newspaper De Tribune in 1909 Mendels left the party in March to join the newly formed Social Democratic Party (SDP) as a member of its leadership but left a few months over conflicts over the SDP's perceived authoritarian leadership.

In 1913, Mendels was elected from the Schoterland district to the House of Representatives. In 1914, Mendels caused controversy by proposing legislation allowing judges to prevent the eviction of tenants unable to pay their rent. He was also active on colonial issues, supporting an end to Dutch oppression of the inhabitants of the Dutch East Indies and the establishment of state sugar cooperatives in the region.

He was reelected in the 1917 Dutch general election, but quit the House of Representatives the next year and became a member of the Senate in 1919. He was a member of the Senate until 1937, and served as the SDAP's parliamentary leader in the Senate for the last two years of his term.

== Later life ==
During the German occupation, the Mendels family was first forced to move to the Transvaalbuurt neighbourhood in Amsterdam and because Maup Mendels could not go into hiding due to deafness the family was then deported to Westerbork transit camp. Mendels and his wife were forced to leave their daughter Judica behind, and were sent to Theresienstadt concentration camp, where Maup Mendels died on 3 June 1944. Both his wife and his daughter survived the Holocaust.
