= Dirk Bos =

Dutch politician (1862–1916)

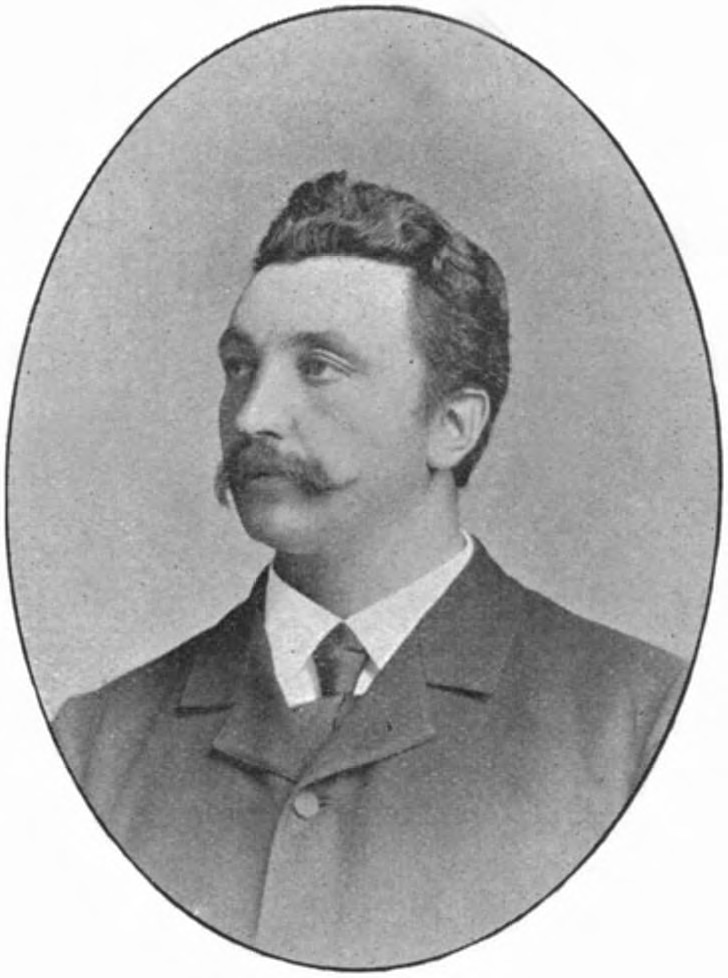
- Dirk Bos in 1901

Member of the House of Representatives
- In office 17 September 1901 – 6 May 1916
- Preceded by: Boelo Luitjen Tijdens
- Succeeded by: Eltjo van Beresteyn
- Constituency: Winschoten

Personal details
- Born: 13 September 1862 Groningen, Netherlands
- Died: 6 May 1916 (aged 53) The Hague, Netherlands
- Party: Liberal Union (until 1901); VDB (1901-1916)
- Spouse: Margaretha Henderika Meihuizen (m. 1888)
- Children: 6
- Education: University of Groningen

Dirk Bos (13 September 1862 – 6 May 1916) was a Dutch businessman and politician. He was a member of the Dutch House of Representatives from 1901 until his death in 1916 for the left-liberal Free-thinking Democratic League (VDB), serving as its leader from 1913 to 1916.

== Early life ==
Dirk Bos was born on 13 September 1862 in Groningen to Derk Bos, and Maria Reintjes. Dirk Bos grew up in a middle-class family of relatively modest means, his father being a watchmaker, failed businessman and later a government employee, and his mother being an ambitious non-conformist who insisted on giving Dirk and his five siblings a good education. After attending secondary school in Groningen, Bos studied mathematics and physics at the University of Groningen, where he met Pieter Jelles Troelstra while part of the executive of the Groninger Studentencorps Vindicat atque Polit. He graduated in 1883, and became a teacher at a secondary school in Winschoten, where he would work until 1893. In 1888, Bos also obtained a doctorate at the University of Groningen.

In the following years, Bos became involved in business, founding a mortgage bank in Veendam together with his brother-in-law in 1890 and becoming co-director of a trading firm in coffee and tea in Winschoten in 1893.

== Political career ==
Bos first entered into politics on the local level, being elected to the municipal council of Winschoten for the local progressive liberal electoral association in 1893. The year prior, Bos had been chosen as chairman of that electoral association. In 1898, Bos joined the national executive of the Liberal Union.

In the 1897 Dutch general election, Bos first ran for the House of Representatives for the Liberal Union in the strongly progressive liberal Winschoten electoral district. Bos's support for free trade alienated the wealthy farmers of the district, who supported protectionist radical Boelo Luitjen Tijdens instead.

In 1901, Bos broke with the Liberal Union over Bos's advocacy for universal suffrage, joining the left-liberal Free-thinking Democratic League (VDB). During the general elections that same year, Bos ran again in Winschoten, and was victorious, being able to obtain the support of many of the wealthy farmers who had previously voted for Tijdens, who chose not to run.

=== Member of the House of Representatives ===
As an MP, Bos mainly focused on education, finance, and socio-economic affairs. He also served as the VDB's colonial spokesperson until 1905, traveling to Dutch Suriname in 1911 as a member of an economic advisory commission. Bos was seen as a popular and authoritative figure within the House of Representatives.

Bos was an advocate for free trade, having previously founded the free trade association Het Vrije Ruilverkeer in 1896 which united liberal free traders. He saw free trade as both economically beneficial and a means of promoting international cooperation. Following the 1903 railroad strikes, Bos vehemently opposed efforts by the Kuyper cabinet to ban strikes in the public sector. In 1908, he led a commission aimed at helping small businesses. He also supported the creation of a state-owned central bank and the nationalization of railroads.

Bos held a keen interest in education, writing a book in 1898 advocating for universal education and far-reaching reforms of the Dutch education system. Bos supported minister Abraham Kuyper's plans to reform higher education as MP, and personally participated in the founding of several secondary schools and trade colleges in Winschoten, Rotterdam, The Hague, and Groningen. In 1913, Bos would chair a "pacification committee" aimed at resolving the school struggle between confessional and secular parties. This led to a 1916 report which advocated for equalizing government funding between religious and public schools, paving the way for the Pacification of 1917.

In 1912, Bos began to push for a "progressive concentration" between the VDB and the two other liberal parties, the Liberal Union and the League of Free Liberals, where the three parties would enter into an electoral alliance and run on a shared manifesto. This manifesto was heavily influenced by Bos's ideas, including support for universal male suffrage, public education, and free trade.

=== VDB leader and formateur ===
Following the 1913 Dutch general election, in which the "progressive concentration" had won 37 seats, Bos was appointed as formateur, tasked with forming a broad left-wing coalition that included the SDAP. He entered into contact with SDAP leader Pieter Jelles Troelstra, offering him three ministerial posts and a commitment to work towards universal suffrage and a state pension scheme. Bos's overtures were rejected by the SDAP, after which Bos refused to form a progressive liberal minority cabinet with SDAP support. This then led to the formation of the Cort van der Linden cabinet, and contributed to a personal rift between Bos and Troelstra.

That same year, Bos succeeded Hendrik Lodewijk Drucker as the VDB's leader in the House of Representatives. Drucker and Bos had previously had an internal conflict over Bos's perceived ambition, whereupon Bos had threatened to leave the VDB entirely and which had contributed to Drucker's decision to not stand for reelection. As leader, Bos participated in an anti-war council in 1914. He also clashed with minister of finance Willem Treub over the funding of military expenditures, with Bos arguing for a one-time wealth tax on large companies, earning him the support of the SDAP.

== Death ==
Around 1913, Bos had begun to have failing health as a result of overexertion, and his health had sharply declined after December 1915.

Dirk Bos died on 6 May 1916 in The Hague.

== Personal life ==
Bos married Margaretha Henderika Meihuizen, the daughter of an industrialist, on 18 December 1888. The couple had four daughters and two sons together.

== Bibliography ==
- Klijnsma, Meine Henk (2007). Om de Democratie: de Geschiedenis van de Vrijzinnig-Democratische Bond, 1901-1946 [About Democracy: the History of the Free-thinking Democratic League, 1901-1946] (in Dutch). Amsterdam: Bert Bakker. ISBN 978-90-351-3239-9.
