= Hendrik Pyttersen =

Dutch politician and publisher (1845-1919)

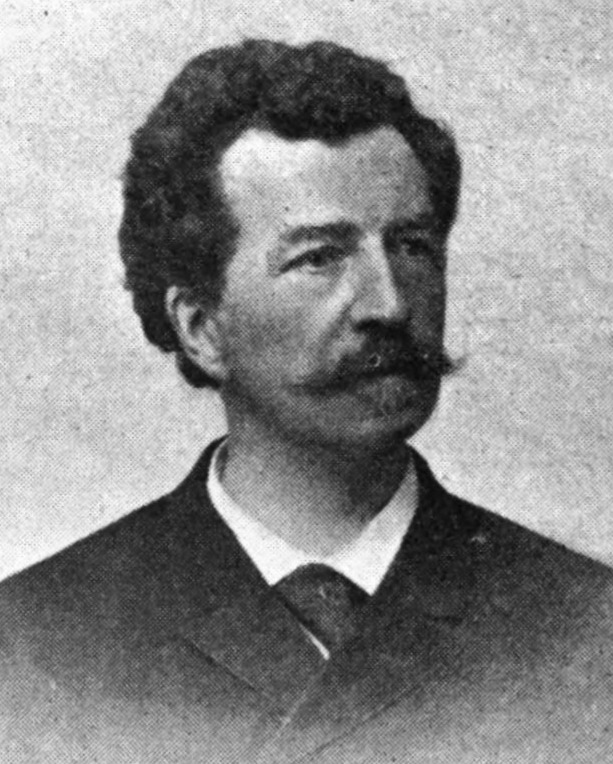
- Hendrik Pyttersen in 1897

Member of the House of Representatives
- In office 15 September 1891 – 20 March 1894
- Preceded by: Ferdinand Domela Nieuwenhuis
- Succeeded by: Geert van der Zwaag
- Constituency: Schoterland
- In office 16 May 1894 – 17 September 1901
- Preceded by: Carel Victor Gerritsen
- Succeeded by: Gerrit Willem Melchers
- Constituency: Leeuwarden

Personal details
- Born: Hendrik Tjeerdszoon Pyttersen; 24 May 1845 Nijehaske, Netherlands
- Died: 10 September 1919 (aged 74) Arnhem, Netherlands
- Party: Liberal Union
- Other political affiliations: Club-Pyttersen (1896-1897); Economic League
- Spouse: Maria Lucia Stienstra (m. 1873)
- Children: 3

Hendrik Tjeerdszoon Pyttersen (24 May 1845 – 10 September 1919) was a Dutch politician, publisher and writer. From 1891 to 1901, he was a member of the Dutch House of Representatives representing the Liberal Union, until 1894 for the Schoterland electoral district and afterward for the Leeuwarden electoral district. He was the founder of Pyttersen's Dutch Almanac in 1900, which was published yearly until 2014.

== Early life ==
Hendrik Tjeerdszoon Pyttersen was born on 24 May 1845 in Nijehaske to Tjeerd Pyttersen, a Protestant minister, and Anke Haga. Pyttersen initially intended on pursuing a career in the Royal Netherlands Navy, but was rejected due to nearsightedness. He became interested in literature, and moved first to Brussels, and later to Paris to work in the book trade, where he became influenced by figures such as Émile Zola, François Coppée, and Camille Flammarion.

After rejecting offers to take over the book store at which he was employed and to emigrate to the United States, Pyttersen moved to Sneek in 1870, where he opened his own bookstore and worked as a publisher of mainly poetry and history works. On 28 May 1873, Pyttersen married Maria Lucia Stienstra, with whom he would have three children.

During this period, Pyttersen became politically active, founding a Committee for General Suffrage in 1879, and joined the Liberal Union, becoming the head of its branch in Sneek in 1886.

== Political career ==
In the 1891 Dutch general election, Pyttersen initially ran in the Sneek district, but was defeated by the Anti-Revolutionary Party candidate Willem Gerard Brantsen van de Zijp. Following the election, Pyttersen was chosen as the Liberal Union candidate in a by-election Schoterland district after Willem Treub chose not to take up his seat, and was elected successfully in a by-election. As an MP, Pyttersen spoke about various subjects, including Dutch Suriname, water infrastructure, labour, and taxation.

In 1892, Pyttersen submitted a proposal allowing for the establishment of Chambers of Labour, an organisation consisting of representatives of workers and employers which would have had the power to issue non-binding rulings on labour conflicts. His proposal was withdrawn in 1895, although a similar law was passed in 1897. In 1897, Pyttersen proposed a law banning night work for bakers, but the proposal was never voted on. He would remain active in this struggle even after leaving the House of Representatives, serving as an honorary member of a national congress to ban night work for bakers in 1907. Pyttersen was an advocate for the settlement of Suriname by Dutch emigrants, in particular of Dutch farmers, and wrote a book on the history of the European colonisation of Suriname.

In 1896, Pyttersen formed his own political group in the House of Representatives, named the Club-Pyttersen, which consisted of thirteen liberals who had voted in favour of a proposal by Samuel van Houten to expand the electoral franchise, while the rest of the progressive liberal group led by Hendrik Goeman Borgesius had voted against as they deemed the proposal insufficiently radical. The group largely did not operate as a separate political party, mainly serving to denote their opposition to the other progressive liberals in the House of Representatives, and disbanded in 1897.

In the 1897 Dutch general election, Pyttersen was defeated in Schoterland by independent socialist Geert van der Zwaag, but was then elected in the Leeuwarden electoral district. In 1901, he was defeated by Gerrit Willem Melchers of the Social Democratic Workers' Party (SDAP).

== Later life ==
In 1901, Pyttersen published the first edition of Pyttersen's Dutch Almanac, which listed the names, addresses and further information about various organisations and groups deemed important to Dutch society. Pyttersen's Dutch Almanac would continue for 112 editions, the last of which was published in 2014.

Following his electoral defeat, Pyttersen moved to Arnhem, where he had been the head editor of a local newspaper the Nieuwe Arnhemsche Courant since 1898. He was also a member of the Arnhem municipal council from 1907 to 1913, and became involved with Willem Treub's Economic League from 1918.

Hendrik Pyttersen died on 10 September 1919 in Arnhem.
