= Jan ter Laan =

Dutch politician (1872–1956)

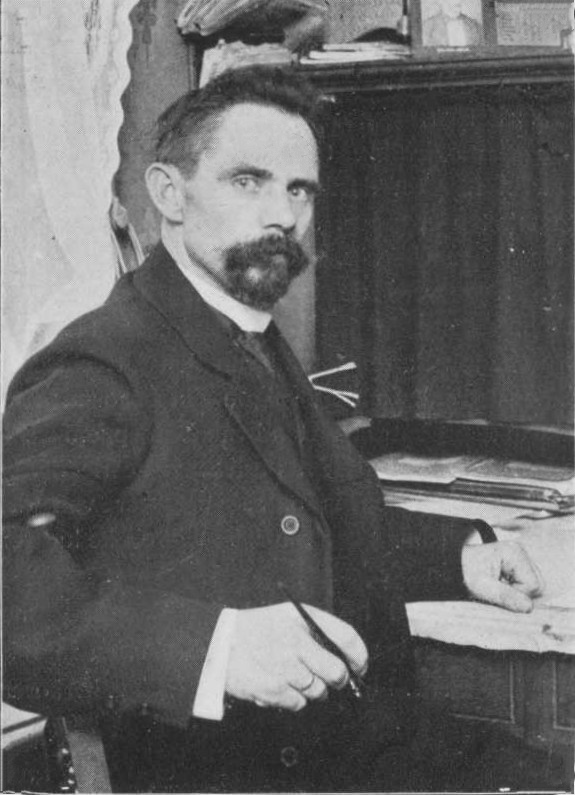

Member of the House of Representatives
- In office 13 October 1931 – 15 September 1941
- In office 16 September 1913 – 5 September 1929
- Constituency: Rotterdam V (1913–1918)

Personal details
- Born: 12 December 1872; Slochteren, Netherlands
- Died: 9 August 1956 (aged 83); Rotterdam, Netherlands
- Political party: Social Democratic Workers' Party
- Spouse: Hendrika te Niet (m. 1901)
- Children: 4
- Relatives: Kornelis ter Laan (brother)

Jan ter Laan (12 December 1872 – 9 August 1956) was a Dutch politician and long-term member of the House of Representatives for the Social Democratic Workers' Party. He was also a member of the council of Rotterdam and a member of Provincial Council of South Holland.

== Biography ==
Laan was a younger brother of Kornelis ter Laan. The financial resources of his parents were not sufficient, especially after his brother, to give him a good education. After primary school he went to work on his father's farm. Later in life he received private lessons from his brother in Arnhem. Jan succeeded then in the practice of taxes. He was active in the Union of Trade Unions in the Netherlands and became a member of the SDAP.

Between 1913 and 1939 he was a member of the municipal council in Rotterdam. In 1929 he was elected alderman of that city, but was not successful. After two years he resigned. In 1913 he was elected a member of the Lower House. He remained an MP until September 1941, with a break during his alderman between November 1929 and October 1931. In the room he was mainly concerned with civil affairs. Between 1916 and 1939 he was a member of the Provincial Council of South Holland.

He married Hendrieka te Niet. Together they had four daughters. He died at almost 84 years old.

House of Representatives of the Netherlands
Preceded by Gerrit de Jongh	Member for Rotterdam V 1913–1918	District abolished
