= Joseph Limburg =

Dutch politician and lawyer (1866–1940)

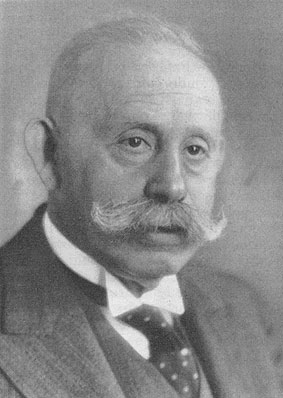
Limburg

Joseph Limburg (29 December 1866 – 15 May 1940) was a Dutch politician who served as a member of the House of Representatives between 1905 and 1918, and as a member of the Council of State between 1926 and 1940.

== Early life and career ==
Limburg was born in The Hague on 29 December 1866, and worked as a substitute judge in the same city between 1898 and 1926. As a member of the Free-thinking Democratic League (VDB), he was elected to the Provincial Council of South Holland for the district The Hague in 1904, and retained his seat until 1926. He also served in the provincial executive from 1907 until 1926.

== National political career ==
Limburg contested the 1905 Dutch general election in three electoral districts and was elected by the district of The Hague I, defeating the incumbent Anti-Revolutionary member Johannes Krap. He took office as a member of the House of Representatives on 19 September 1905. Limburg was subsequently re-elected in the districts of Schoterland in 1909 and Groningen in 1913 and 1917. As a member of the House, he focussed on matters of justice, labour and education. In 1911, he was one of four Free-thinking Democratic members to vote in favour of a bill to combat indecency. In 1917, he successfully brought about a private members' bill for the amendment of the Higher Education Act along with Willem Albarda, Max Bongaerts and Alexander de Savornin Lohman. The amendment allowed graduates of the hogere burgerschool to enrol at the mathematics, physics and medicine programmes at universities.

In the 1918 general election, the first held under proportional representation, Limburg was the second-placed VDB candidate in the western provinces, but was not elected because Eltjo van Beresteyn received more preference votes. Limburg's tenure in the House ended on 17 September 1918. In 1923, he was a serious contender for the mayoralty of Rotterdam, but he declined. After the fall of the Colijn I cabinet in November 1925, he was tasked with forming a new cabinet, in which he would serve as minister of justice. However, the formation attempt failed, as the Christian Historical Union refused to agree to the proposed solution to the dispute regarding the diplomatic mission of the Netherlands to the Holy See. After Freethinking-Democratic leader Henri Marchant had expressed dissatisfaction with Limburg's formation attempt, the latter left the party.

Limburg was appointed to the Council of State on 1 May 1926, serving on the council's departments of justice, agriculture, social affairs and administrative disputes. He retained this position until his death in The Hague on 15 May 1940.

House of Representatives of the Netherlands
Preceded by Johannes Krap	Member for The Hague I 1905–1909	Succeeded by Kornelis ter Laan
Preceded by Geert van der Zwaag	Member for Schoterland; 1909–1913	Succeeded by Maup Mendels
Preceded by Hendrik Lodewijk Drucker	Member for Groningen; 1913–1918	District abolished
