= Franciscus Lieftinck =

Dutch politician (1835–1917)

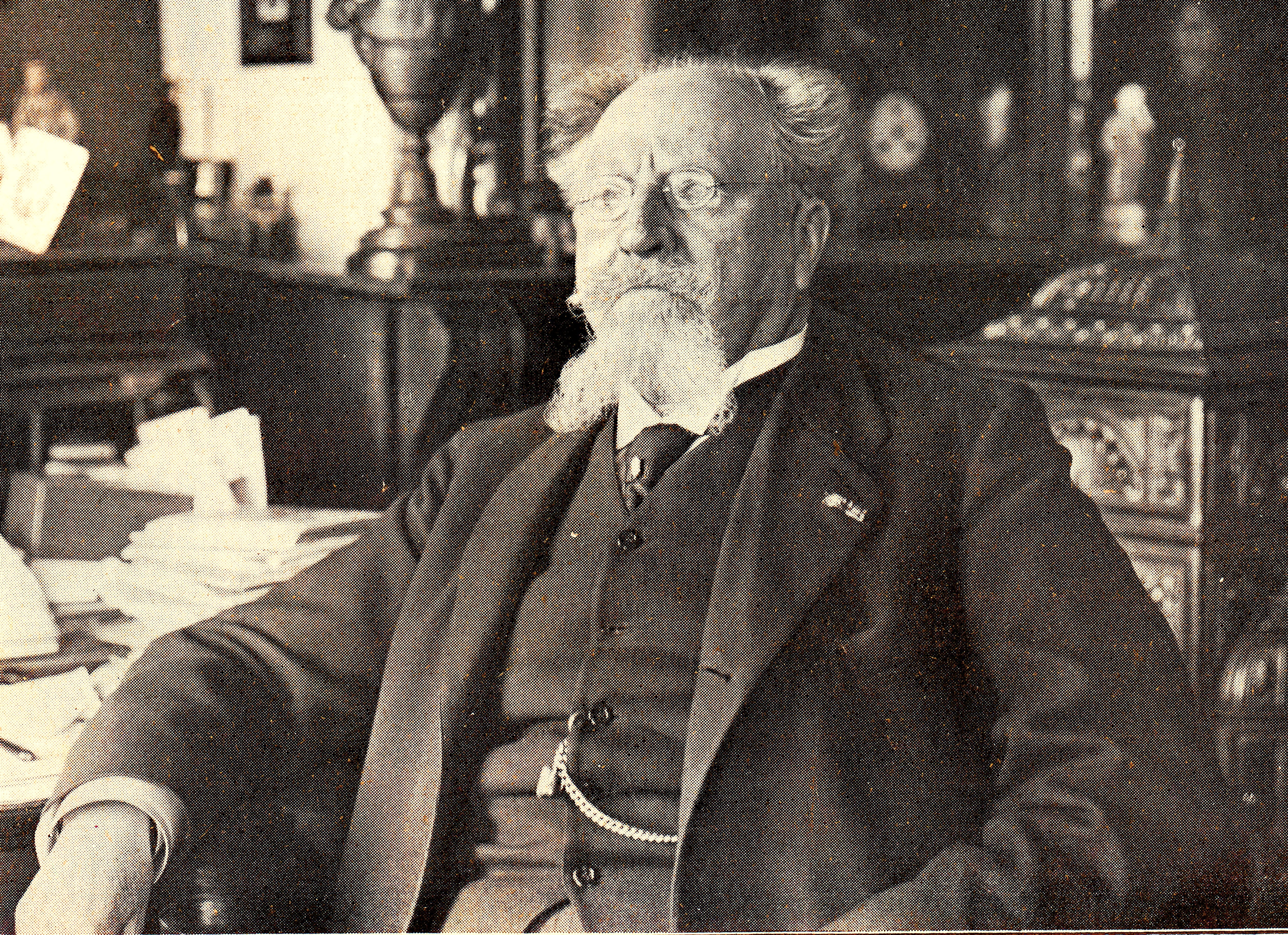
- Franciscus Lieftinck in 1914

Member of the House of Representatives
- In office 18 February 1879 – 27 March 1888
- Preceded by: Jan Karel Hendrik de Roo van Alderwerelt
- Succeeded by: Johannes Zaaijer
- Constituency: Leeuwarden
- In office 1 May 1888 – 1905
- Preceded by: seat established
- Succeeded by: Pieter Lodewijk Tak
- Constituency: Franeker
- In office 1905 – 27 June 1917
- Preceded by: Hendrik Goeman Borgesius
- Succeeded by: Jan van Gilse
- Constituency: Zutphen

Personal details
- Born: 8 June 1835 Odoorn, Netherlands
- Died: 7 July 1917 (aged 82) Haarlem, Netherlands
- Party: Liberal Union
- Other political affiliations: progressive liberal Takkian (1894)
- Spouse(s): Sijtske Zijlstra; Cornelia Nicolaine Johanna Smits van der Goes; Hermine Marie Elisabeth Holtzman
- Relations: Willem Visser 't Hooft (grandson)
- Children: 4
- Education: Groningen College

Franciscus Lieftinck (8 June 1835 – 7 July 1917) was a Dutch Reformed minister and progressive liberal politician. He was a member of the Dutch House of Representatives from 1879 until his death in 1917 for the Liberal Union, representing the districts of Leeuwarden from 1879 to 1888, Franeker from 1888 to 1905, and Zutphen from 1905 to 1917.

== Early life ==
Franciscus Lieftinck was born on 8 June 1835 in Odoorn to Jan Wolter Lieftinck, a minister, and Hemmina Uilkens. In 1853, he enrolled at Groningen College (later known as the University of Groningen), studying theology and graduating in 1860. In Groningen, Lieftinck became influenced by the modernist or liberal (vrijzinnig) tendency within the Dutch Reformed Church, studying under figures of the "Groningen School" such as Cornelis Philippus Hofstede de Groot. In September 1860, Lieftinck became minister in the Frisian village of Boijl, before moving to Kimswerd in 1863. He became known for his great wealth during this period. In 1879, Lieftinck resigned as minister in order to take up a career in politics.

== Political career ==
Lieftinck was first elected to the House of Representatives in the 1879 Dutch general election from the Leeuwarden electoral district. He was a member of the Liberal Union, and was seen as belonging to the left-wing of the House of Representatives. In the 1890s through 1900s, he was also a part of several informal progressive-liberal parliamentary groupings. Lieftinck was known as a domineering speaker, and was nicknamed the "mouth on legs" for his tendency to verbally intimidate his opponents. He would also attempt to motivate MPs he thought were speaking too long by embarrassing them or making noise.

As an MP, Lieftinck focused on issued including agriculture, water infrastructure, defense, and education. During the school struggle, Lieftinck was a strong advocate for public education, which taught a liberal form of Christianity, versus the anti-revolutionary politicians led by Abraham Kuyper, who advocated for religious education. He supported instead a single general education system uniting people of all denominations. He also sought to actively represent the interests of his constituencies, such as his demands in 1882 for improvements in seafaring, following the sinking of the Zr.Ms. Adder, to satisfy the concerns of shippers in the port city of Harlingen. In 1886, he supported a failed proposal to allow the Dutch parliament to vote on declarations of war.

In the 1888 Dutch general election, Lieftinck moved to the Franeker electoral district. Lieftinck was a staunch anti-militarist, being in the minority of liberals to vote against proposals to introduce conscription in 1891 and 1901. He also supported proposals in this period to move away from indirect taxation and lower taxes on the poor. In the 1890s, Lieftinck was a Takkian, a supporter of minister Johannes Tak van Poortvliet's unsuccessful proposal to establish universal male suffrage.

Lieftinck was a part of the Free-thinking Democratic parliamentary group from 1897 to 1901, but did not play any significant role in the Free-thinking Democratic League (VDB). In 1905, Lieftinck moved seats again to the Zutphen electoral district. From 1908, Lieftinck was the oldest member of the House of Representatives, and led the first meeting of each new parliamentary session. In 1916, he was part of a minority of Liberal Union MPs to vote against a motion condemning minister Willem Treub's pension proposals, which was passed and led to Treub's resignation. In 1917, Lieftinck was the only liberal to vote against the constitutional changes which equalized funding between public and religious education.

During the last part of his life, Lieftinck was in failing health and was considered nearly blind. Lieftinck died on 7 July 1917 in Haarlem.

== Personal life ==
Lieftinck was married three times, to Sijtske Zijlstra, Cornelia Nicolaine Johanna Smits van der Goes and Hermine Marie Elisabeth Holtzman. He had one son, Jan Lieftinck, who was eventually forced to move out to make room for his father's third wife after the two previous ones had died at a young age. He was the grandfather of Willem Visser 't Hooft, the first secretary-General of the World Council of Churches. Lieftinck was an active Freemason.

Lieftinck became a knight in the Order of the Netherlands Lion in 1898 and a commander in the Order of Orange-Nassau in 1909. He also received an award from Shah of Persia Naser al-Din Shah Qajar during his time in Haarlem.
