= Social Democratic League =

Former Dutch political party

Social Democratic League Sociaal-Democratische Bond
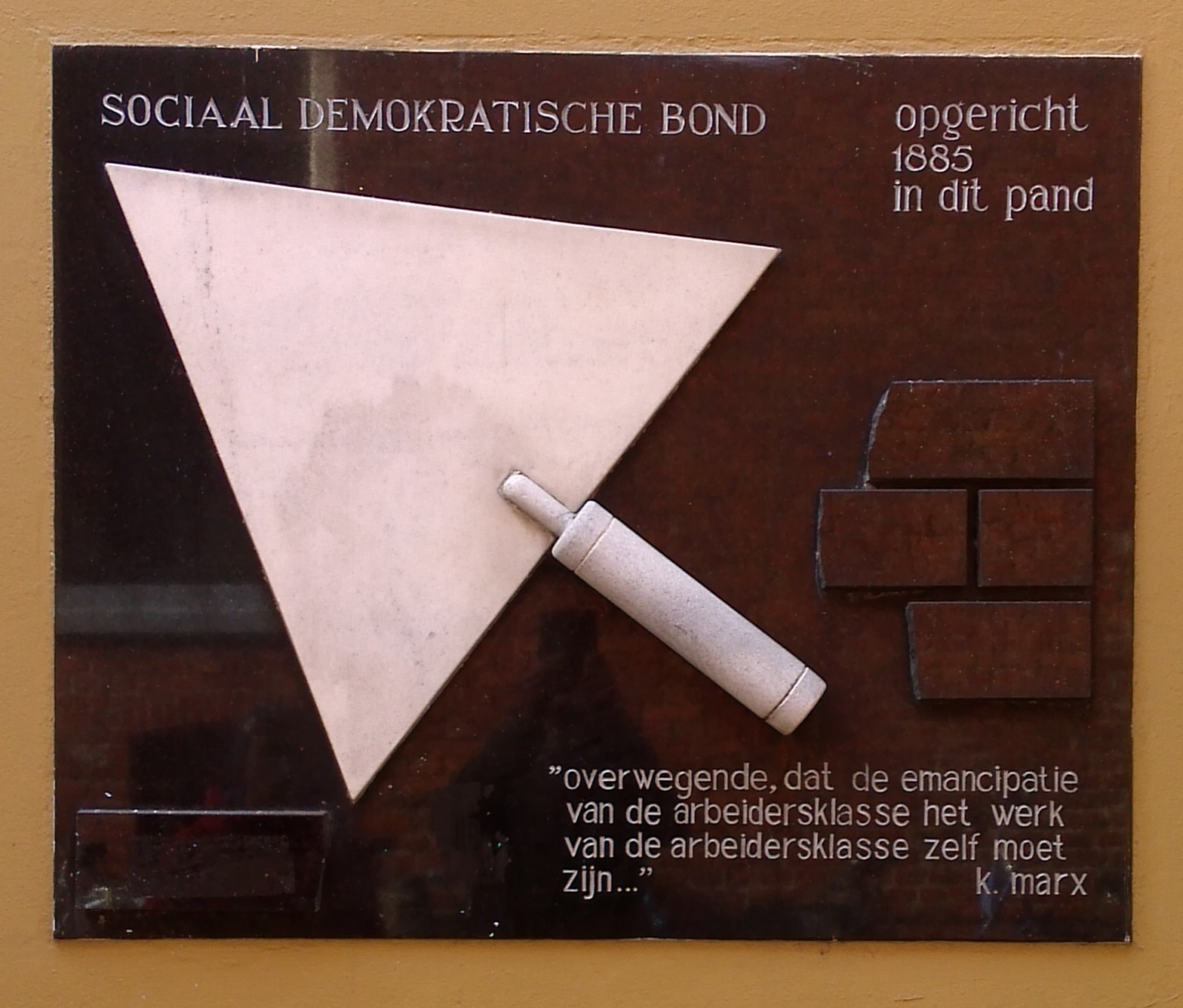
- Abbreviation: SDB
- General Secretary: Ferdinand Domela Nieuwenhuis
- Founded: 1881
- Dissolved: 1900
- Preceded by: SDV
- Succeeded by: NAS; SDAP
- Newspaper: Recht voor Allen
- Ideology: Revolutionary socialism Social democracy Factions: Anarchism; Reformism
- Political position: Left-wing
- House of Representatives (1888): 1 / 100

The Social Democratic League (Dutch: Sociaal-Democratische Bond, SDB) was a socialist political party in the Netherlands. Founded in 1881 by Ferdinand Domela Nieuwenhuis, the SDB was the first socialist party to enter the House of Representatives.

== Party history ==
=== Before 1881 ===
In the 1860s, a socialist movement began to develop in the Netherlands. The development was aided by the foundation of the Dutch section First International, the foundation of the first trade unions and strong social tendencies among free-thinking circles.

Most of those unions however were united in the moderate General Dutch Workers' Union (Algemeen Nederlandsch Werklieden-Verbond; ANWV) in 1871, which was founded by Protestants and liberals to combat the influence of the Dutch section of the First International. Some prominent Dutch representatives of the First International joined the ANWV in order to radicalise the organisation. In 1878 they, led by Willem Ansing, left the ANWV to found the Sociaal-Democratische Vereeniging (Social-Democratic Association; SDV). It had branches in major cities like Amsterdam, The Hague, Haarlem and Rotterdam.

=== 1881–1893: Social Democratic League ===
The SDB was founded in 1881 by members of the SDV and similar local socialist parties. The strongest of these local socialist parties were located in the poor rural province Friesland. The party was based on Marxist principles and therefore expected a proletarian revolution. In 1882, Ferdinand Domela Nieuwenhuis, a lapsed Lutheran minister, was elected as general secretary of the party. He would hold this position until 1887 and grow to become the party's strongman, he retained the position when he was in prison in 1886–1887 for insulting the monarchy. The party published the paper "Justice for All" (Recht voor Allen) of which Domela was editor. The SDB was also affiliated to the League for General Suffrage, which Domela Nieuwenhuis had also participated in founding, which was a dominantly liberal organisation which campaigned for universal suffrage.

In 1888, despite the party's revolutionary orientation it decided to participate in the election. Domela Nieuwenhuis was elected to the House of Representatives for the district of Schoterland. The party was supported by the liberal Frisian People's Party (Friesche Volkspartij). Domela Nieuwenhuis won the seat in the second round with the support from the Protestant Anti-Revolutionary Party, which preferred a socialist over a liberal MP. In parliament Domela Nieuwenhuis tried to gain attention for the interests of the Dutch workers, but he was ignored by other MPs.

In the 1891 general election, Domela decided not stand for reelection. His seat was taken by Willem Treub, a member of the left-liberal Radical League. This electoral defeat led to debate within the party. A group of 'moderates' wanted to continue the parliamentary work and the reformist course, another group, led by Domela Nieuwenhuis, wanted to pursue an anti-parliamentary course with a strong anarchist orientation. This led to a split; during the SDB party conference of 1893 in Groningen, a majority voted to stop participating in elections. A minority of members led by Pieter Jelles Troelstra tried to prevent this, and eventually left the party as a result, founding the Social Democratic Workers' Party (SDAP) in August 1894, modeled on the German SPD.

=== 1893–1900: Socialists' League ===
In 1893, the SDB was forbidden by the court because the party had promoted illegal means to attain its goal. In response the party renamed itself Socialists' League (Socialistenbond, SB). When the anarchist elements began to take full control of the SDB, important regional social democratic figures who supported participation in elections joined the group around Troelstra. Together they formed a group called "the twelve apostles", who would play a key role in the founding of the SDAP. In 1896, the radical wing of the party, led by Domela Nieuwenhuis, left the SB and continued without a party organisation, opting for an anarchist course which focused on direct action. They founded the paper De Vrije Socialist ("The Free Socialist") and became strongly linked to the Nationaal Arbeidssecretariaat (National Workers' Secretariat; NAS), an anarcho-syndicalist union founded in 1893. In 1901 the district of Schoterland elected the independent Socialist candidate, Geert van der Zwaag, as its MP. His views were similar to those of Domela Nieuwenhuis in the 1880s. In 1900, the SB joined the SDAP which had become electorally successful. When Domela Nieuwenhuis died in 1919, the anarchist movement in the Netherlands lost significance.

=== Name ===
Before the Russian Revolution, the term social democrat, socialist and communist were used interchangeably to denote a Marxist ideology. Social democrat was not more or less radical than socialist. The organisations called itself League (Bond) because it did not see itself as a party in the traditional sense. It was entrenched in the extra-parliamentary opposition and only participated elections twice, during the 1888 and 1891 Dutch general election before the party abandoned parliamentarianism in 1893.

== Ideology and issues ==
The SDB was a Marxist party, and it saw a socialist revolution, which would replace the capitalist system with a socialist one, as inevitable. Important issues for the party were the prohibition of alcohol, the abolition of the standing army and the replacement of the monarchy with a democratic republic and the independence of the Dutch East Indies.

Practical social-economic reforms the party wanted to implement were the free education, better pay for teachers, a ban on child labour, a limited working day for women, the implementation of a system of social security and a better housing for workers.

== Representation ==
This table shows the SDB's results in elections to the House of Representatives and Senate, as well as the party's political leadership: the fractievoorzitter is the chair of the parliamentary party and the, in this case sole, candidate in the general election, these posts are normally taken by the party's leader.

Year	HoR	S	Candidate	Fractievoorzitter
1888	1	0	Ferdinand Domela Nieuwenhuis	Ferdinand Domela Nieuwenhuis
1889	1	0	no elections	Ferdinand Domela Nieuwenhuis
1890	1	0	no elections	Ferdinand Domela Nieuwenhuis

== Electorate ==
The electorate of the SDB was mainly located in the poor rural province of Friesland. In the 1888 the party profited from the extension of suffrage to small farmers and other members of the middle class. In the second round the support of the Protestant ARP was crucial. They supported the SDB because they preferred a socialist over a liberal. In the 1890s the party began to win support in the poor rural province of Groningen and larger cities, like Amsterdam and Zaandam. The SDAP would however soon overtake the party in these regions.

== Bibliography ==
- Charite, Johannes (1972). De sociaal-democratische bond als orde- en gezagsprobleem voor de overheid (1880-1888) (in Dutch). Den Haag: Zuid-Hollandsche Drukkerij.
- Bos, D. (2001-05-08). Waarachtige volksvrienden. De vroege socialistische beweging in Amsterdam, 1848-1894. Amsterdam: Prometheus. ISBN 9789035123151.
