= Maximilien Joseph Caspar Marie Kolkman =

Dutch politician

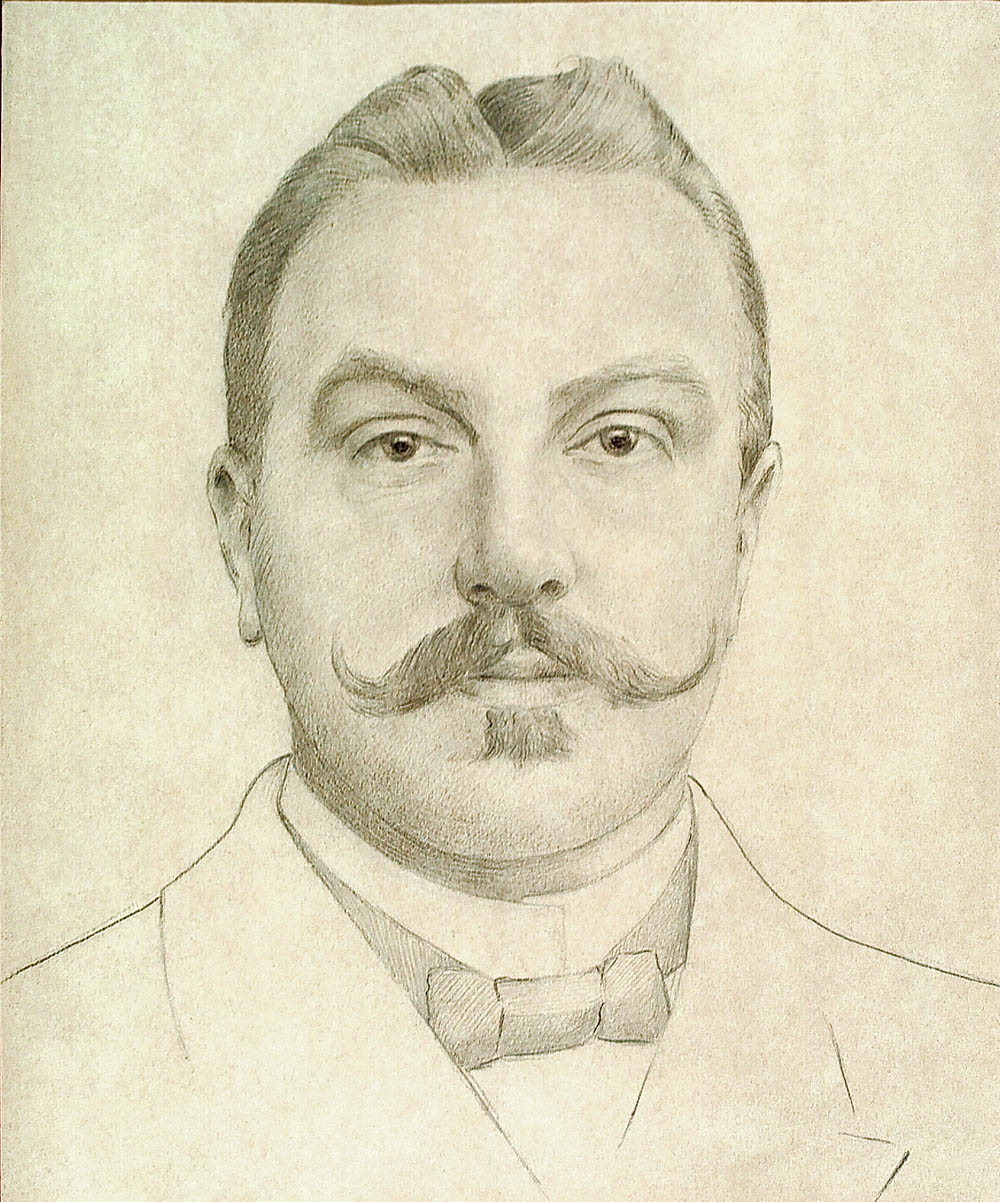
Maximilien Joseph Caspar Marie Kolkman

Maximilien Joseph Caspar Marie Kolkman (9 March 1853 – 19 February 1924) was a Dutch Catholic politician who served as minister of finance between 1908 and 1913.

Kolkman was born in Dordrecht on 9 March 1853 to the merchant Joannes Frederikus Kolkman and Elisabeth Masion. He attended the Jesuit gymnasium in Katwijk, and subsequently studied law at Leiden University. After receiving his doctorate in 1878, he settled in Arnhem as a lawyer.

He was first elected to the House of Representatives for the district of Nijmegen in 1884, taking office on 6 May of that year. At 31, he was the youngest member of parliament at the time. In the House, Kolkman became the Roman Catholics' financial spokesperson, and additionally concerned himself with water management and the interior. As a democratically-minded Catholic, he was an early follower of Herman Schaepman, and after Schaepman's death in 1903, Kolkman succeeded him as chair of the Roman Catholic parliamentary group. In addition to being a member of the House of Representatives, Kolkman also served on the municipal council of The Hague starting in 1893, and on the Provincial Council of South Holland starting 1894.

On 12 February 1908, Kolkman was appointed minister of finance in the Theo Heemskerk cabinet, he position he held until the end of the cabinet's term on 29 August 1913. As minister of finance, he amended the Succession Act in 1911 to introduce a progressive inheritance tax, among other changes. He also attempted to increase tariffs, but the amendment of the Tariff Act was stalled by the parliamentary opposition, and became one of the causes of the Coalition's defeat in the 1913 general election.

After his ministership he joined the provincial executive of South Holland in 1913, and returned to the House of Representatives in 1916. He served in both offices until his death in The Hague on 19 February 1924.

Party political offices
Preceded by Herman Schaepman	Chair of the Roman Catholic parliamentary group 1903–1908	Succeeded by Jan Loeff
Political offices
Preceded by Theo de Meester	Minister of Finance; 1908–1913	Succeeded by Anthonij Ewoud Jan Bertling
