= Ferdinand Domela Nieuwenhuis =

Dutch socialist (1846–1919)

De zeer eerwaarde and The Honourable Ferdinand Domela Nieuwenhuis MP
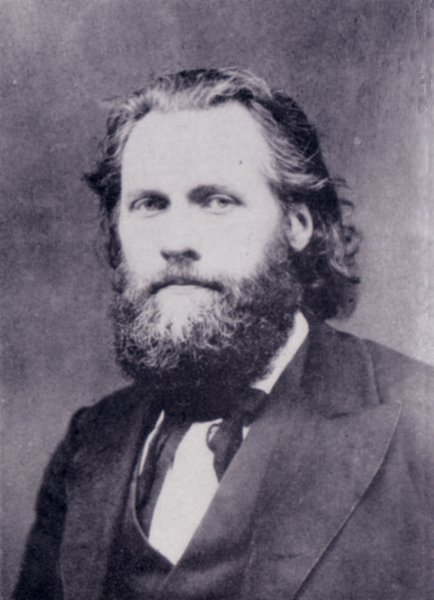

Member of the House of Representatives
- In office 1 May 1888 – 15 September 1891
- Preceded by: Constituency established
- Succeeded by: Hendrik Pyttersen
- Constituency: Schoterland

Personal details
- Born: Ferdinand Jacobus Domela Nieuwenhuis; 31 December 1846 Amsterdam, Netherlands
- Died: 18 November 1919 (aged 72) Hilversum, Netherlands
- Resting place: Westerveld [nl], Driehuis, North Holland, Netherlands
- Party: Social Democratic League (until 1897)
- Spouses: Johanna Egberta Godthelp (before 1919) Johanna Adriana Verhagen (m. 1874; died 1877) Johanna Lulofs (m. 1870; died 1872)
- Children: 8, including César
- Occupation: Pastor; Politician; Writer; Activist

Ferdinand Jacobus Domela Nieuwenhuis (Note: Dutch pronunciation: //) (31 December 1846 – 18 November 1919) was a Dutch socialist politician and later a social anarchist and anti-militarist. He was a Lutheran preacher who, after he lost his faith, started a political fight for workers. He was a founder of the Dutch socialist movement and the first socialist in the Dutch parliament.

== Biography ==
=== Early life and career ===
Ferdinand Domela Nieuwenhuis was born on 31 December 1846, in the Dutch city of Amsterdam. He was born into a relatively wealthy family, and raised in the Herengracht district. His father, Ferdinand Jacob Domela Nieuwenhuis, was a Lutheran priest and theology professor from a Danish family.

In 1870, Nieuwenhuis followed his father into the Lutheran clergy, within which he began to develop liberal tendencies. He was influenced by the literary works of Weimar Classicism, the French Enlightenment and the Dutch anti-colonial activist Multatuli, as well as the political philosophy of liberals such as John Stuart Mill and socialists such as Karl Marx and anarchists such as Peter Kropotkin.

During this time in the church, he lost two wives in childbirth, which turned him towards agnosticism. He also came to support the causes for universal suffrage and social reform, moving him towards socialism. By 1879, he had lost his fath in the Christian God and left the Lutheran church, although he continued to be inspired by the teachings of Jesus.

=== Socialist leadership ===
After leaving the church, Nieuwenhuis became something of a socialist preacher and began publishing a journal, Recht voor Allen, which became the first publication of the nascent Dutch socialist movement. He also led the establishment of the Social Democratic League (SDB). During the 1880s, as economic development in the Netherlands led to increasing exploitation of labour, Nieuwenhuis saw increasing levels of support for his socialist programme, as his speeches went from drawing a handful of people to thousands. Nieuwenhuis gained a messianic position within the rising Dutch socialist movement, with some Frisian agricultural workers even referring to him as "our redeemer". Nieuwenhuis would even come to refer to himself as the "reedemer of the proletariat". His speeches were noted for their relative lack of demagoguery, as he spoke in a controlled, modest manner, and his physical appearance was compared to that of Jesus. He believed that socialism was not only an economic or political philosophy, but a matter of justice and something one should exemplify; he therefore refused to consume meat or drink alcohol.

Nieuwenhuis led large demonstrations calling for universal suffrage and ran in elections on a platform of anti-capitalism, anti-clericalism, anti-militarism, republicanism and temperance. The Dutch government refused to recognise the SDB and cracked down on the movement, blaming socialists for riots and preventing them from holding meetings. In 1886, Nieuwenhuis was charged with treason for denouncing William III. For violating Dutch lèse majesté laws, he was sentenced to one year in prison. His sentencing gave him the status of a martyr within the Dutch socialist movement. It happened at the same time as the Haymarket affair in the United States, which influenced him towards anarchism. His supporters campaigned for his release, and following the birth of Princess Wilhelmina, he was granted clemency and released. Shortly after his release, he was attacked by an anti-socialist mob in Rotterdam.

Following his release, Nieuwenhuis ran in the 1888 Dutch general election and was elected to the House of Representatives, as a representative for Friesland. This made him the first socialist member of parliament in Dutch history. In parliament, he advocated for several social reforms, including the eight-hour day, the establishment of a social security system under workers' self-management and a national statistics agency, the independence of Indonesia and other colonies, and the reclamation of the Zuiderzee. He and his proposals were largely rejected or ignored by parliamentarians, which frustrated him. By the time of the 1891 Dutch general election, in which he failed to secure re-election, he had come to reject reformism and parliamentary politics entirely and was convinced of the need for a revolutionary socialism.

=== Anarchist activism ===
As a personal acquaintance of socialist leaders such as Friedrich Engels, Wilhelm Liebknecht and William Morris, Nieuwenhuis became a leading figure within the Socialist international, within which he found himself aligning with the dissident anarchist faction. In 1891, he attended the International's Brussels Congress, where he proposed that workers of all countries carry out a general strike in the event of war breaking out. The Congress instead called for socialist parties to strengthen themselves so they could agitate against the instigation of war, which Nieuwenhuis considered to be a half measure. He became critical of the leaders of the international socialist movement, who he believed had distanced themselves from rank-and-file workers and sought to become a new ruling class that could suppress dissent within their own ranks. He wrote pamphlets warning that state socialism was in danger of replicating capitalist state structures, should one party line come to predominate the international socialist movement. Under his influence, the SDB took an anti-parliamentary line, which caused some social democrats to break away and establish the Social Democratic Workers' Party (SDAP) in 1894. Nieuwenhuis was expelled from the Socialist International in 1896.

By 1897, his ideological differences with the social democrats had caused him to break completely from the socialist movement. He left the SDB to start a new publication, De Vrije Socialist. Nieuwenhuis became a leading voice of the Dutch anarchist movement and began to refer to himself as a "libertarian socialist". He began to advocate for a form of social anarchism, increasingly emphasising a critique of authority and calling for bottom-up forms of organisation. Most members of the SDB initially remained loyal to Nieuwenhuis, out of personal respect for him. But as his conflict with the SDAP became more bitter, tinged by his own interpersonal disputes, they largely moved towards syndicalism or joined the SDAP. The small group that remained around him with De Vrije Socialist were mostly inactive and socially isolated. In response to Abraham Kuyper's government introducing new labour laws that limited the right to strike, a joint committee of anarchists, social democrats and syndicalists called a general strike in April 1903. But when the laws were passed by parliament, the social democrats in the committee abruptly called off the strike and thousands of striking workers were subsequently dismissed from their jobs; Nieuwenhuis accused them of betraying the workers.

Nieuwenhuis also became involved in the anti-war movement, founding the International Anti-Militarist Association and its newspaper De wapens neer in 1904. The organisation had pacifist objectives, calling for an end to military spending and for the independence of Indonesia from the Dutch colonial empire, but it was not non-violent in its methods, as Nieuwenhuis continued to push for a general strike to stop war. He rejected his invitation to the International Anarchist Congress of Amsterdam in 1907, having become critical of anarchists organising themselves into specifically anarchist organisations. The execution of the Catalan rationalist teacher Francesc Ferrer in 1909 made a deep impression on Nieuwenhuis, who found himself envying Ferrer's martyrdom and wanting to emulate. Nieuwenhuis was devastated by the outbreak of World War I, as the international anti-war solidarity he had hoped would manifest was instead abandoned by European workers. He nevertheless continued to anti-war demonstrations and criticised anarchists who supported the Allies.

=== Later life ===
Later in his life, the anarchist movement held a crowdfunder, in which thousands of people contributed a dubbeltje each week, to provide Nieuwenhuis and his wife with a pension. In 1916, a public commemoration was held in celebration of his 70th birthday. He lived to witness the end of the war and the subsequent wave of revolutions, but he remained skeptical of the authoritarian socialists leading them. He wrote that their error was "in the wish to rule". Nieuwenhuis died on 18 November 1919, in Hilversum. His funeral in Amsterdam was attended by roughly 11,000 people, who came from around the country, and its procession was lined by red flags.

== Legacy ==
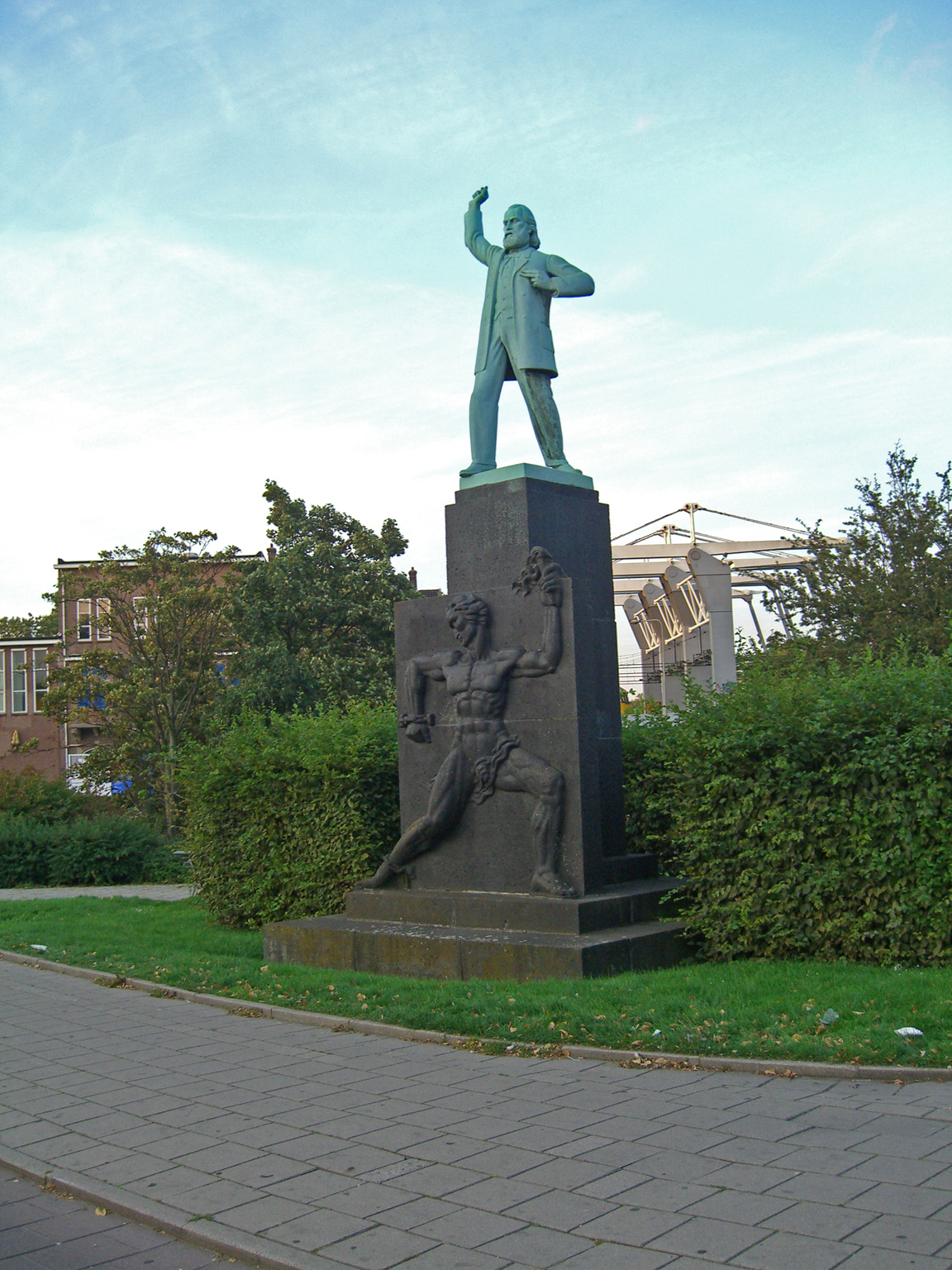
Statue of Nieuwenhuis on Nassauplein, Amsterdam

In 1931, a statue of Nieuwenhuis was erected on Amsterdam's Nassauplein. A museum of his life and work was opened at the International Institute of Social History. The contemporary Dutch anarchist movement, which reemerged with the Provos in the 1960s, did not inherit Nieuwenhuis' brand of social anarchism, but he continued to receive recognition from it. On the 50th anniversary of his death, in May 1969, students occupied a building of the University of Amsterdam and symbollically renamed it to "Domela Niewnhuis University". In 1971, Dutch historian Rudolf de Jong described Nieuwenhuis as an anarchist "messiah".

== Selected works ==
Books

- Helen en Hahven [Wholes and Halves] (1879)
- Le Socialisme en danger [Socialism in Danger] (1896)
- De geschiedenis van het Socialisme [A History of Socialism] (1902)
- Van Christen tot Anarchist [From Christian to Anarchist] (1910)

== Bibliography ==
- Altena, Bert (2009). "Nieuwenhuis, Ferdinand Domela (1846–1919)". The International Encyclopedia of Revolution and Protest. pp. 1–2. doi:10.1002/9781405198073.wbierp1095. ISBN 9781405198073.
- Altena, Bert (2017). "'No man and no penny': Ferdinand Domela Nieuwenhuis, anti-militarism and the opportunities of the First World War". In Adams, Matthew S.; Kinna, Ruth (eds.). Anarchism, 1914–18: Internationalism, anti-militarism and war. Manchester University Press. pp. 114–134. doi:10.7765/9781526115768.00013. ISBN 9781526115768.
- de Jong, Rudolf (1971). "Ferdinand Domela Nieuwenhuis: Anarchist and Messiah". Delta: A Review of Art, Life, and Thought in the Netherlands. 13 (4). Translated by Wentholt-Haig, Elizabeth. ISSN 0011-8001 – via The Anarchist Library.
