= Hendrik Jan Smidt =

Dutch politician

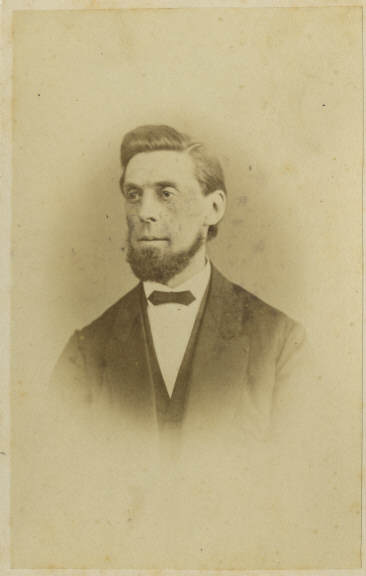
Hendrik Jan Smidt.

Hendrik Jan Smidt (11 October 1831, in Assen – 14 March 1917, in The Hague) was a Dutch liberal politician. He served as Minister of Justice twice, and was Governor-General of Suriname between 30 July 1885 and 18 July 1888.

House of Representatives of the Netherlands
Preceded by Johan Rudolph Thorbecke	Member for Assen; 1871–1877; With: Lucas Oldenhuis Gratama	Succeeded by Warmold van der Feltz
New district	Member for Emmen; 1888–1891	Succeeded by Petrus Hendrik Roessingh
Political offices
Preceded by Theo van Lynden van Sandenburg	Minister of Justice; 1877–1879	Succeeded by Anthony Modderman
Preceded by Gustave Ruijs de Beerenbrouck	Minister of Justice; 1891–1894	Succeeded by Willem van der Kaay
Government offices
Preceded by Johannes van Heerdt tot Eversberg	Governor-General of Suriname; 1885–1888	Succeeded by Warmolt Tonckens; Acting
