= Herman Schaepman =

Dutch priest, politician and poet

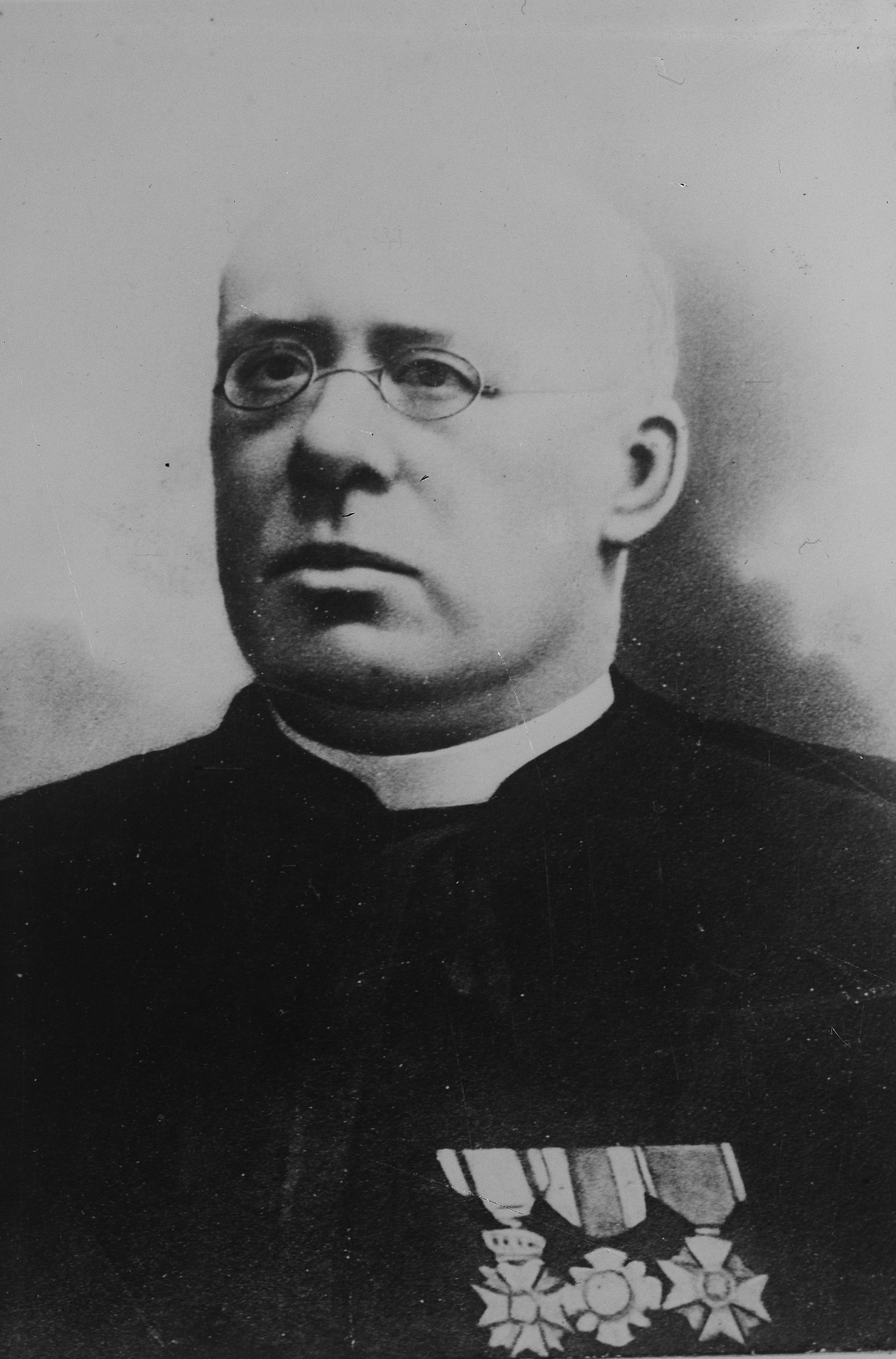
Herman Schaepman

Herman Johannes Aloysius Maria Schaepman (Tubbergen, Overijssel, 2 March 1844 – Rome, 21 January 1903) was a Dutch priest, politician and poet.

== Life ==
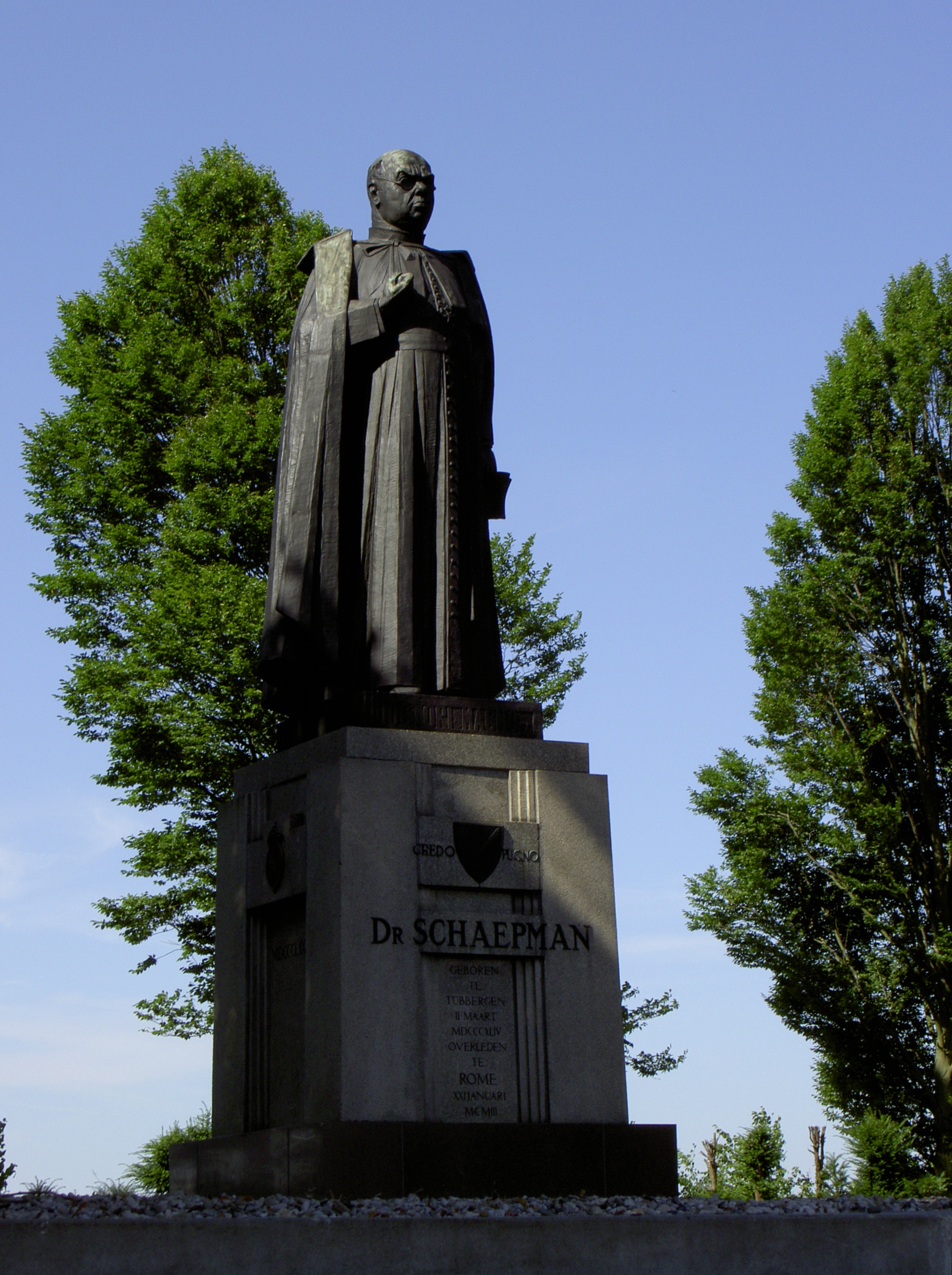
Statue of Herman Schaepman by August Falise in Tubbergen

Herman’s father was major Theodoor Eduard Johannes Schaepman.

Schaepman went to primary school in Tubbergen. He made his studies in the college of Oldenzaal and went to the seminaries of Culemborg and Rijsenburg, was ordained as a Catholic priest at Utrecht in 1867, and obtained the degree of Doctor of Divinity in 1869 at Rome. He was immediately able to use his education as secretary to bishop of Haarlem at the Vatican Council of 1869-1870. He also functioned as a kind of quartermaster for the Dutch bishops and had a spot in the front row during the entire council. In 1869 his collected poems were published, he was only 25. In 1870, he was professor of church history at the seminary of Rijsenburg. At the same time he became a collaborator on De Tijd, and in 1871, in conjunction with W. J. F. Nuyens, he founded the periodical De Wachter (from 1874–83, Onze Wachter). Because of his title as doctor, and the rarity of higher education among Dutch Catholics at that time, he become he became known as “the Doctor” among them. He was very clerical and supportive of the office of pope, sometimes extreme, and supported the dogma of infallibility introduced at the First Vatican Council.

Schaepman wanted to formulate a Christian response to modernity. This was also one of the reasons for promulgating papal infallibility in the face of the legacy of the Enlightenment. According to Tjerk de Reus Schaepman fought against the marginalization of Dutch Catholics by depicting liberals as the “propagandists of the devil”. He was the first priest to be elected to the States General of the Netherlands, and campaigned for the emancipation of the Catholics. In 1883 he formulated and presented a programme of action, his motto being "Catholics constitute a political personality which demands liberty." He was either ignored or opposed. But even at that time he entertained the idea of an eventual coalition between Catholics and Protestants, and for that reason supported the project for the revision of the Constitution (1887). The revision of the school-law, as part of the school struggle was mainly due to him.

Schaepman developed the qualities of a statesman. The democratic movement was a fact; and, instead of vainly trying to stem it, he endeavoured to secure a hold on it. For this reason he acted independently in regard to the law concerning personal military service (1891–98), the Tak elections law (1894), and the compulsory education law (1900). his Catholic opponents had, no doubt, good intentions, but they forgot that now they had influence and were able to obtain what was formerly beyond their reach.

Schaepman, in the beginning of his political career, was averse to paternalism in government and wished to limit its functions to what was absolutely necessary. Later, however, he followed more in the footsteps of von Ketteler. Instead of allowing inevitable events to become detrimental to Catholics, he sought to shape them as far as possible, to Catholic advantage. One of Schaepman's achievements was the coalition which, in conjunction with Abraham Kuyper, he brought about between Catholics and anti-revolutionists. Schaepman's merits were recognized by Pope Leo XIII, who bestowed upon him the rank of domestic prelate and prothonotary Apostolic.

When Schaepman died, Abraham Kuyper wrote to Rome: Quis non fleret ("who would not cry?")

== Orator ==
For many years he was considered a leading Dutch orator. His convincing, powerful manner was first displayed in his "Park speech", delivered in Amsterdam (1871), and was evinced in his speech at the Congress of Middelburg (1872) and in those on Pius IX, Vondel, the Maid of Orléans, De Taal, Daniel O'Connell, Michel Angelo etc. His last oration, delivered in 1902, was in honour of Ferdinand Hamer.

== Works ==
Schaepman was a major poet. The appearance of his first poem, "De Paus" (published in 1866), was a literary event. Among his later poems those of especial note are: "De Pers, De eeuw en haar koning, Napoleon" (1873), and his master work "Aya Sofia" (1886).

Schaepman's principal prose writings are collected in five volumes under the title "Menschen en Boeken" (Utrecht, 1893–1902).

The 1913 Catholic Encyclopedia describes Schaepman's writing as "lofty, incisive, sarcastic, vigorous, witty."

House of Representatives of the Netherlands
Preceded by Willem Cremers	Member for Almelo; 1891–1903	Succeeded by Piet Aalberse
