= Johannes Tak van Poortvliet =

Dutch politician

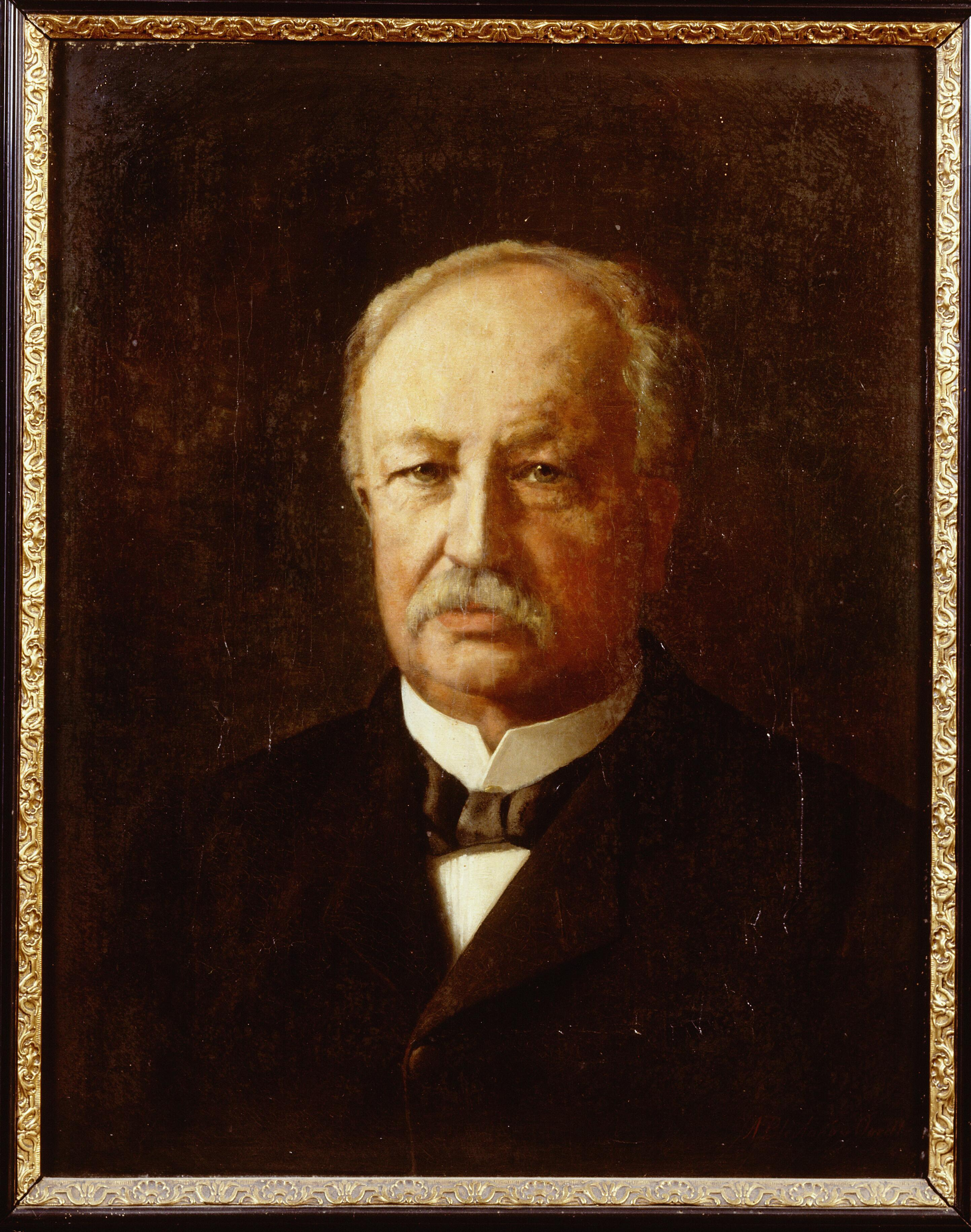
Johannes Tak van Poortvliet painted by Adri Bleuland van Oordt

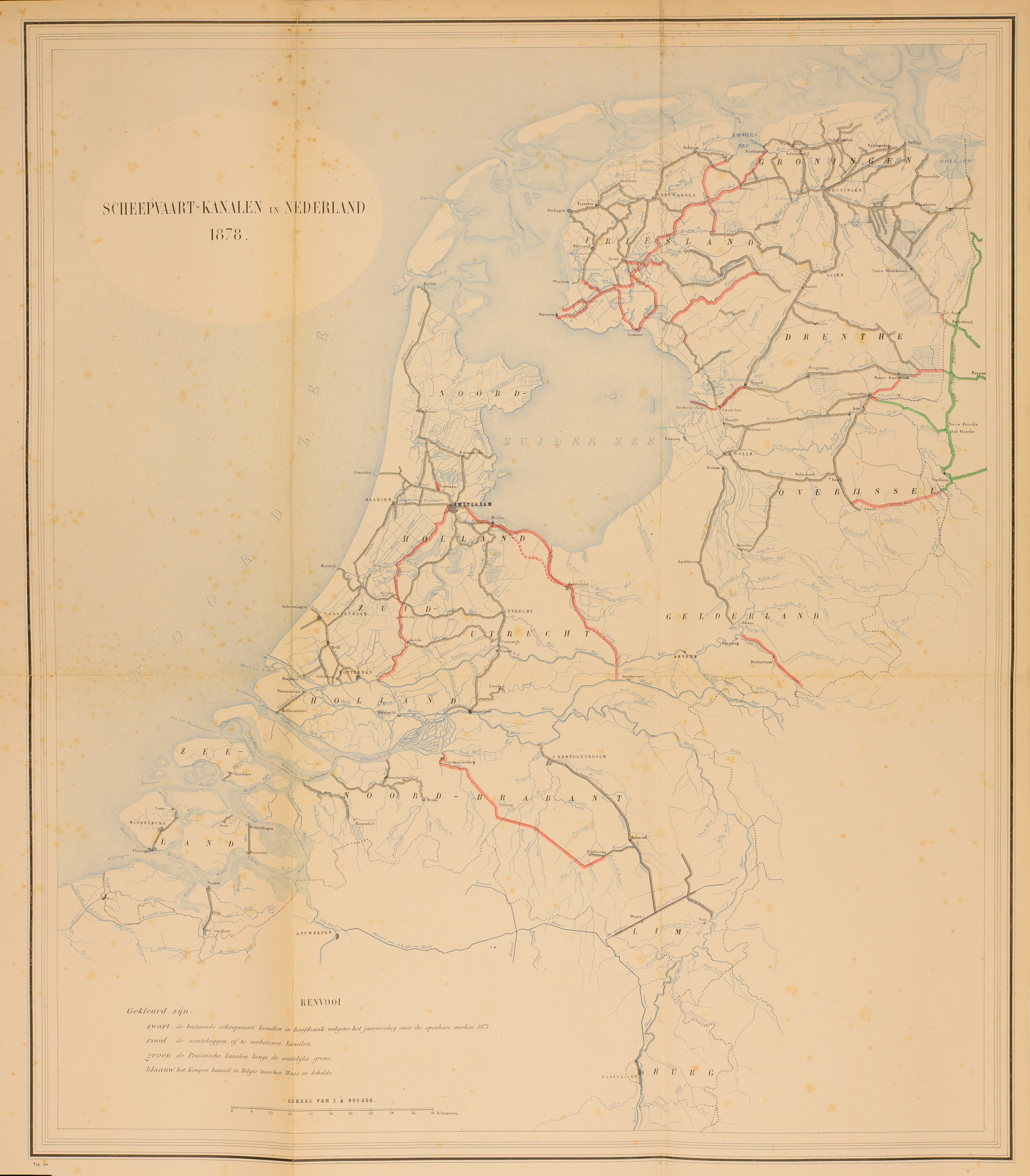
Waterways in the Netherlands, 1878. Existing ones in grey, proposed canals in red, Tak van Poortvliet's Canal Act of 1878

Johannes Pieter Roetert Tak van Poortvliet (born J.P.R. Tak) (21 June 1839, Engelen – 26 January 1904, The Hague), lord of the manor of Poortvliet and Cleverskerke, was a Dutch politician.

== Biography ==
He was born in Engelen, North Brabant where his father, Adriaan Tak, was a Dutch Reformed minister. His father was a wealthy man, being the largest landowner in Zeeland. Johannes Tak studied law in Leiden (1857–1862), but he did not practise law. He entered the public service and was one of the secretaries (commies-griffier) of de House of Representatives, the lower house of the Dutch parliament. In 1868 he became the secretary of the State Commissioner for water management in Zeeland and he showed himself a skillful man.

Johannes Tak van Poortvliet was attracted to liberalism. He was elected to the House of Representatives in 1870 and was a strong supporter of Jan Kappeyne van de Coppello, the leader of the progressive liberals. In 1877 he entered the Kappeyne van de Coppello cabinet as Minister of Water Management and Trade. In 1878 his "Canal Act," intended to improve the Dutch waterways, mainly by adding some major canals, was rejected by the House of Representatives. Tak and the other ministers of the cabinet resigned.

Tak van Poortvliet returned to the House of Representatives in 1881 and became leader of the progressive liberals (Kappeynianen). From 1884 to 1888 he was a member of the Senate (upper house of parliament), but he returned in the House of Representatives in 1888. He was an ardent supporter of suffrage extension, an issue which strongly divided the Liberals. After the liberals won the parliamentary election in 1891, he was asked to become Minister of the Interior in the Van Tienhoven cabinet. However, he only wanted to join the cabinet if the question of suffrage extension would become the main priority. As Minister of the Interior, he proposed a bill which would extend the right to vote to the whole adult male population. However, the right, including the "old liberals", were opposed and his bill was rejected by a majority of the House of Representatives in 1894. He dissolved the House, and hoped that new elections would result in a progressive majority. However, the Takkianen (his followers) lost the elections. Although he returned in the House of Representatives, first representing the district of Amsterdam and then Beverwijk, he had lost most of his influence. From 1901 to 1904 he was again a member of the Senate.

Johannes Tak van Poortvliet was also a Dijkgraaf of the water board of Delfland (1887–1891).

He died on 26 January 1904 in The Hague. At the time of his death he was a very rich man. His money was willed to his four children, one of whom, Marie, used it to become an art collector and patron.

== Political functions ==
- Leader of the Kappeynianen from February 1880 till 16 November 1884.
- Member of the Party Executive of the Liberal Union (Liberale Unie).

== Name ==
- In 1874 his name was officially changed from Johannes Pieter Roetert Tak in Johannes Pieter Roetert Tak van Poortvliet. The latter part of his new last name refers to the Manor of Poortvliet (family property since the late 18th Century).

== Family ==
Johannes Pieter Roetert Tak van Poortvliet was married to Louisa van Oordt (1850–1879). The couple had four children (3 daughters and 1 son). One of his daughters was Maria Tak van Poortvliet (1871–1936), a follower of Rudolf Steiner.
