= Adolf Robbert van de Laar =

Dutch politician (1871–1959)

- Adolf Robbert van de Laar in 1922

Member of the House of Representatives
- In office 17 September 1918 – 24 June 1922

Member of the Provincial Council of Gelderland
- In office 1 July 1919 – 1 July 1926

Personal details
- Born: 22 April 1871 Gendringen, Netherlands
- Died: 21 January 1959 (aged 87) Amersfoort, Netherlands
- Party: Christian Social Party (1912–1925); Protestant People's Party (1925–1926)
- Education: Utrecht University

Adolf Robbert van de Laar (22 April 1871 – 21 January 1959) was a Dutch politician. He founded the minor Protestant left-wing and anti-Catholic Christian Social Party (CSP), for which he was a member of the Dutch House of Representatives from 1918 to 1922.

== Early life ==
Adolf Robbert van de Laar was born on 22 April 1871 in Gendringen to Jacob Willem van de Laar, a Protestant mayor of the largely Catholic town of Gendringen, and Anna Isabella van Woelderen. After completing his secondary education in Doetinchem, Van de Laar studied law at Utrecht University from 1890 to 1895, obtaining his doctorate with a thesis on land nationalization. He subsequently began work as a civics teacher at the Hogere Burgerschool in Utrecht from 1895 to 1901 and in Zaltbommel from 1896 to 1903. In Utrecht, Van de Laar befriended Andries Willem Bronsveld, a Dutch Reformed minister critical of Abraham Kuyper and his cooperation with Catholic politicians, who unsuccessfully encouraged Van de Laar to join the Christian Historical Voters' League in 1897. That same year, Van de Laar joined the executive leadership of the National Christian Abstinence League (Nationale Christen-Geheelonthoudersvereeniging), a Christian temperance organization, which he would remain part of until 1907.

== Political career ==
Van de Laar first became politically active in 1903, when he became active in an organization led by Christian trade unions opposing the 1903 railway strikes. That same year, Van de Laar was diagnosed with tuberculosis, forcing him to recuperate at an estate he had inherited from his parents in Gendringen and from which he ran a fruit nursery, during which he began writing, publishing two pamphlets in 1908 and a magazine from 1909. Van de Laar criticized the two main Protestant parties, the Anti-Revolutionary Party (ARP) and the Christian Historical Union (CHU) both for their economic conservatism and their willingness to cooperate with Catholics.

In 1912, Van de Laar founded the Christian Social Party, which took part in the 1913 Dutch general election. Although the party only obtained 4,500 votes and 0 seats in the House of Representatives, contemporaries including in the CHU accused Van de Laar of splitting the right-wing Christian vote, although Van de Laar denied having encouraged his supporters to vote for left-wing parties. After obtaining no seats in the 1917 Dutch general election, Van de Laar was elected to the House of Representatives in the 1918 Dutch general election, following the adoption of party-list proportional representation. In 1919, Van de Laar was also elected to the Provincial Council of Gelderland for the CSP.

=== In the House of Representatives ===
After his election, Van de Laar quickly made an impression on his colleagues due to his rhetorical skills, with Pieter Oud noting his "words overwhelmed the House", and Alibert Cornelis Visser van IJzendoorn describing Van de Laar as "someone who talks himself drunk." Van de Laar focused on several policy issues, including economic progressivism, anti-Catholicism, and opposition to the equalization of funding between religious and public schools, being the only MP from a Christian party to oppose it on account of it benefiting "godless" public schools. Whereas the CSP had been in favor of a strong national defense in the 1910s, Van de Laar became strongly anti-militarist after 1920, speaking out in favor of abolishing the Dutch navy and reducing the Dutch army to a volunteer policing force, and was criticized by Christian socialist MP Willy Kruyt for the contrast with his former views.

Van de Laar's views have been characterized by historian as "eccentric", contributing to the CSP's loss of its single seat in the 1922 Dutch general election, along with the increase in the electoral threshold. In 1925, Van de Laar renamed the CSP to the Protestant People's Party (Protestantse Volkspartij; PVP), in order to distance the party from accusations of socialism. He rebuffed efforts to establish a united Christian Democratic Federation with members of Andries Staalman's Christian Democratic Party, and the PVP ran independently in the 1925 Dutch general election, again failing to win a seat in the House of Representatives. The PVP was disbanded in 1926.

== Later life ==
After leaving the House of Representatives in 1922, Van de Laar returned to Gendringen, where he ran his fruit nursery and was director of a savings bank. In the summer of 1926, Van de Laar suddenly resigned from the municipal council of Gendringen and left the Dutch Reformed Church, selling his home and leaving Gendringen altogether amidst rumors that he had participated in "immoral" acts, and that he might have been a homosexual. Van de Laar subsequently moved to Turnhout in Belgium, where he worked various odd jobs, before returning to the Netherlands in 1929 and founding a real estate agency in Hilversum. After spending World War II in Baarn, Van de Laar settled in Amersfoort in 1945, remaining outside of politics.

Adolf Robbert van de Laar died on 21 January 1959 in Amersfoort.

== Bibliography ==
- Langeveld, H.J. (1988). Protestants en progressief. De Christelijk-Democratische Unie 1926-1946. The Hague: SDU Uitgeverij.
