= Zadok van den Bergh =

Dutch lawyer and politician (1859–1942)

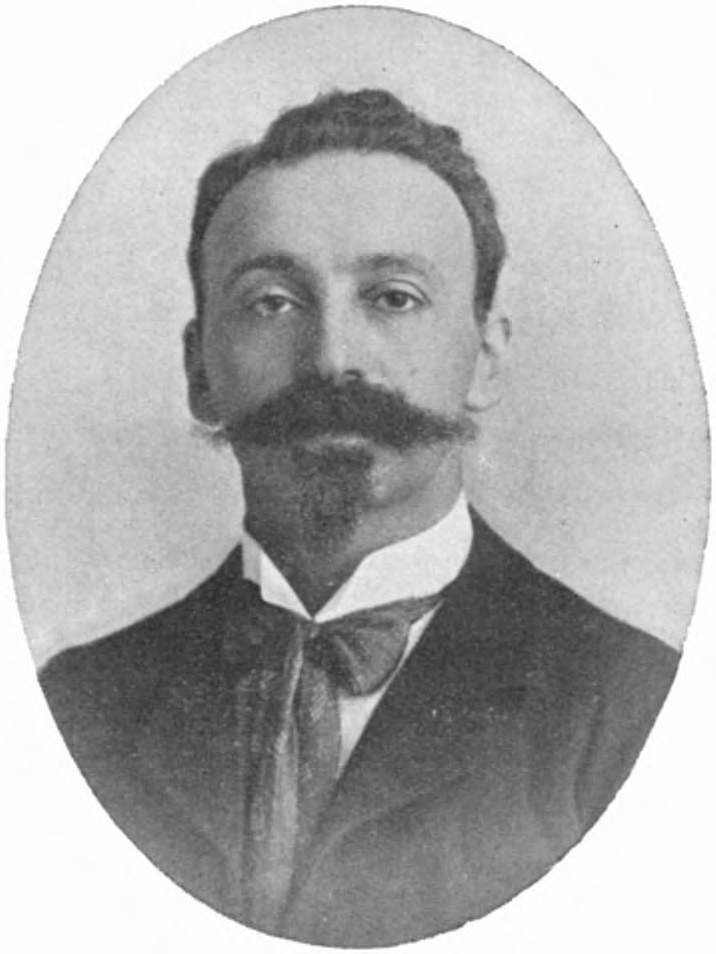
- Zadok van den Bergh in 1905

Member of the House of Representatives
- In office 19 September 1905 – 21 September 1909
- Preceded by: Andries Staalman
- Succeeded by: Theo de Meester
- Constituency: Den Helder

Personal details
- Born: 9 August 1859 Oss, Netherlands
- Died: 12 June 1942 (aged 82) Nice, France
- Party: Radical League (until 1901); VDB (from 1901)
- Spouse(s): Carolina Wolf (m. 1885; died 1921) Alexandrine Charlotte Paulowna van den Berg (m. 1921)
- Relations: Simon van den Bergh (father); Samuel van den Bergh (brother)
- Children: 3
- Education: University of Amsterdam

Zadok van den Bergh (9 August 1859 – 12 June 1942) was a Dutch lawyer and politician. A radical liberal, Van den Bergh became famous for defending various leftist figures as a lawyer, including during the Hogerhuis case from 1898 to 1901. He also served in the Amsterdam municipal council from 1899 to 1911 and from 1919 to 1921, as alderman from 1907 to 1911, and in the Dutch House of Representatives from 1905 to 1909.

== Biography ==
Zadok van den Bergh was born on 9 August 1895 in Oss to Simon van den Bergh, a margarine manufacturer, and Elisabeth van der Wielen. After completing his primary and secondary education in Oss and Nijmegen respectively, Van den Bergh studied law at the University of Amsterdam, graduating cum laude in 1885. That same year, he joined the law firm of David Simons in Amsterdam, where he worked until 1891.

Some of Van den Bergh's most notable cases include his defence of rioters in the 1886 Palingoproer and of Jan Fortuijn, a prominent socialist and later co-founder of the Social Democratic Workers' Party (SDAP). In 1891, Van den Bergh quit legal practice and became a legal advisor for Jacques van Marken, a progressive-minded industrialist, but due to conflicts between the two Van den Bergh eventually returned to practicing law in 1897.

From 1898 to 1901, Van den Bergh served as a lawyer on the Hogerhuis Case, which concerned three brothers who had been convicted of burglary during a trial de novo for the Supreme Court of the Netherlands, but was unable to secure any changes in the brothers' sentences. His performance in this case garnered Van den Bergh considerable fame. He was criticised by Pieter Jelles Troelstra, who considered the case part of a conspiracy of anarchists and radical liberals to delegitimise the SDAP in Friesland.

In 1899, Van den Bergh participated in the founding of the Central Bureau for Social Advice in Amsterdam, a think tank consisting of politicians, employers' and employee associations.

== Political career ==
In 1885, Van den Bergh joined the Amsterdam liberal electoral association Burgerplicht, where he was counted among the group's left wing. He left the Association in 1891, and together with Willem Treub and Carel Victor Gerritsen he led efforts to elect radical candidates to the Amsterdam municipal council, and that same year he became involved with the progressive weekly newspaper Social Weekly. In 1892 he co-founded the Radical League. He initially opposed efforts to join the Radical League together with progressive members of the Liberal Union, preferring instead to cooperate with the SDAP, but when efforts to establish a non-socialist progressive workers' party failed he joined the Free-thinking Democratic League (VDB) upon its founding in 1901. In 1899, Van den Bergh was first elected to the Amsterdam municipal council.

Van den Bergh ran unsuccessfully for the Amsterdam IV district in the House of Representatives twice, losing to Johan George Gleichman in the 1897 Dutch general election and Hendrik Goeman Borgesius in the 1901 Dutch general election, as well as losing a 1901 by-election in the Amsterdam III district. In the 1905 Dutch general election, Van den Bergh was successfully elected from the Den Helder electoral district for the VDB. As an MP, Van den Bergh exclusively focused on issues relating to his district, including improving the port of Texel and other local infrastructure. After his appointment as alderman in Amsterdam in 1907, responsible for public works, his attendance declined, not speaking in the House of Representatives a single time during its 1908-1909 term. He was therefore not renominated for election for the 1909 Dutch general election. Van den Bergh resigned as alderman and municipal councilor after a 1910 conflict with the local VDB over his increasingly solistic actions as a politician. Van den Bergh returned to the Amsterdam municipal council for a single term from 1919 to 1921.

== Later life ==
After his retirement from politics (with the exception of his 1919-1921 term in the Amsterdam municipal council), Van den Bergh returned to practicing law, and took up positions on various executive boards. After 1929, he lived in France part-time, and during the German invasion of the Netherlands was able to flee there. Zadok van den Bergh died on 12 June 1942 in Nice.

== Bibliography ==
- Klijnsma, Meine Henk (2007). Om de Democratie: de Geschiedenis van de Vrijzinnig-Democratische Bond, 1901-1946 [About Democracy: the History of the Free-thinking Democratic League, 1901-1946] (in Dutch). Amsterdam: Bert Bakker. ISBN 978-90-351-3239-9.
