= Wijnkoop =

Wijnkoop is a Dutch surname. Notable people with the surname include:

- David Wijnkoop (1876–1941), Communist foreman and Member of Parliament
- Joseph Wijnkoop (1842–1910), Dutch rabbi and scholar, father of David
