= 1917 Dutch general election =

- 15 June 1917 (first round); 22 June 1917 (second round)
- All 100 seats in the House of Representatives; 51 seats needed for a majority
- Turnout: 38.00%
Party	Leader	Seats	+/–
AB	Willem Hubert Nolens	25	0
LU	Theo de Meester	21	+1
SDAP	Pieter Jelles Troelstra	15	−3
ARP	Abraham Kuyper	11	0
BVL	Meinard Tydeman	10	0
CHU	Alexander de Savornin Lohman	9	+1
VDB	Henri Marchant	8	+1
Ind CHU	C. J. A. Bichon van Ijsselmonde	1	0
This lists parties that won seats. See the complete results below.
Cabinet before	Cabinet after
Cort van der Linden cabinet Liberal	Cort van der Linden cabinet Liberal

General elections were held in the Netherlands on 15 June 1917 to elect members of the House of Representatives of the Dutch Parliament. The elections were held following the Pacification of 1917, an agreement between the seven parties with seats in parliament to allow a change in the constitution to introduce universal manhood suffrage and proportional representation. The parties cooperated to create a supermajority to pass the reforms. Voting did not take place in 50 constituencies where the incumbent ran unopposed.

In the other 50 constituencies with opposition candidates, voting was held on 15 June. The majoritarian two-round system was in effect and a second round was required only in the Amsterdam II constituency, which was held on 22 June, and saw Social Democratic Workers' Party candidate Adriaan Gerhard re-elected.

== Results ==
Party	First round			Second round			Total seats	+/–
Party	Votes	%	Seats	Votes	%	Seats	Total seats	+/–
Liberal Union	43,524	19.47	21				21	+1
Social Democratic Workers' Party	41,775	18.68	14	1,292	59.00	1	15	−3
Free-thinking Democratic League	22,040	9.86	8				8	+1
Anti-Constitutional Revision	19,830	8.87	0				0	0
League of Free Liberals	19,191	8.58	10				10	0
Christian Historical Union	17,547	7.85	9				9	+1
Social Democratic Party	13,603	6.08	0				0	0
General League	12,933	5.78	25				25	0
Anti-Revolutionary Party	9,333	4.17	11				11	0
League of Christian Socialists	4,341	1.94	0				0	0
Country Party	3,344	1.50	0				0	0
Independent Christian Historical	3,276	1.47	1				1	0
Christian Democratic Party	2,989	1.34	0				0	0
General State Party	2,421	1.08	0				0	0
Shopkeepers' Candidate	627	0.28	0				0	0
Independent	6,805	3.04	0	898	41.00	0	0	0
Total	223,579	100.00	99	2,190	100.00	1	100	–
Valid votes	223,579	97.08		2,190	97.20			
Invalid/blank votes	6,733	2.92		63	2.80			
Total votes	230,312	100.00		2,253	100.00			
Registered voters/turnout	606,163	38.00		5,731	39.31			

=== By district ===
Results by district
District	Candidate	Party	First round		Second round	
District	Candidate	Party	Votes	%	Votes	%
Alkmaar	P. van Foreest	League of Free Liberals	Unopposed			
Almelo	A. H. J. Engels	General League	Unopposed			
Amersfoort	W. H. de Beaufort	League of Free Liberals	4,411	89.93		
Amersfoort	J. F. Baerveldt	Anti-Constitutional Revision	342	6.97		
Amersfoort	M. C. van Wijhe	Social Democratic Party	152	3.10		
Amersfoort	Valid		4,905	97.44		
Amersfoort	Invalid		129	2.56		
Amersfoort	Total votes		5,034	100		
Amersfoort	Registered voters/turnout		14,218	35.41		
Amsterdam I	H. F. R. Hubrecht	Liberal Union	1,121	69.28		
Amsterdam I	W. Heineken	Anti-Constitutional Revision	497	30.72		
Amsterdam I	Valid		1,618	95.97		
Amsterdam I	Invalid		68	4.03		
Amsterdam I	Total votes		1,686	100		
Amsterdam I	Registered voters/turnout		6,061	27.82		
Amsterdam II	A. H. Gerhard	Social Democratic Workers' Party	885	49.06	1,292	59.00
Amsterdam II	Z. Kamerling	Independent	639	35.42	898	41.00
Amsterdam II	D. J. Wijnkoop	Independent	280	15.52		
Amsterdam II	Valid		1,804	92.18	2,190	97.20
Amsterdam II	Invalid		153	7.82	63	2.80
Amsterdam II	Total votes		1,957	100	2,253	100
Amsterdam II	Registered voters/turnout		5,731	34.15	5,731	39.31
Amsterdam III	P. Otto	Liberal Union	4,204	63.51		
Amsterdam III	D. J. Wijnkoop	Independent	1,298	19.61		
Amsterdam III	M. Robart	Anti-Constitutional Revision	1,117	16.88		
Amsterdam III	Valid		6,619	95.82		
Amsterdam III	Invalid		289	4.18		
Amsterdam III	Total votes		6,908	100		
Amsterdam III	Registered voters/turnout		19,622	35.21		
Amsterdam IV	J. A. van Hamel	Liberal Union	1,102	75.12		
Amsterdam IV	A. de Hullu	Anti-Constitutional Revision	214	14.59		
Amsterdam IV	D. J. Wijnkoop	Independent	151	10.29		
Amsterdam IV	Valid		1,467	96.26		
Amsterdam IV	Invalid		57	3.74		
Amsterdam IV	Total votes		1,524	100		
Amsterdam IV	Registered voters/turnout		4,978	30.61		
Amsterdam V	T. M. Ketelaar	Free-thinking Democratic League	4,077	57.36		
Amsterdam V	J. Schrijver	Anti-Constitutional Revision	2,448	34.44		
Amsterdam V	D. J. Wijnkoop	Independent	583	8.20		
Amsterdam V	Valid		7,108	97.66		
Amsterdam V	Invalid		170	2.34		
Amsterdam V	Total votes		7,278	100		
Amsterdam V	Registered voters/turnout		20,627	35.28		
Amsterdam VI	B. Nierstrasz	League of Free Liberals	Unopposed			
Amsterdam VII	W. Boissevain	League of Free Liberals	1,337	61.36		
Amsterdam VII	F. van Eeden	General State Party	629	28.87		
Amsterdam VII	D. J. Wijnkoop	Independent	213	9.78		
Amsterdam VII	Valid		2,179	96.97		
Amsterdam VII	Invalid		68	3.03		
Amsterdam VII	Total votes		2,247	100		
Amsterdam VII	Registered voters/turnout		5,874	38.25		
Amsterdam VIII	A. B. Kleerekoper	Social Democratic Workers' Party	1,526	60.68		
Amsterdam VIII	F. van Eeden	General State Party	828	32.92		
Amsterdam VIII	B. de Ligt	League of Christian Socialists	161	6.40		
Amsterdam VIII	Valid		2,515	95.34		
Amsterdam VIII	Invalid		123	4.66		
Amsterdam VIII	Total votes		2,638	100		
Amsterdam VIII	Registered voters/turnout		7,444	35.44		
Amsterdam IX	J. van den Tempel	Social Democratic Workers' Party	5,880	62.29		
Amsterdam IX	J. F. Baerveldt	Anti-Constitutional Revision	1,894	20.06		
Amsterdam IX	D. J. Wijnkoop	Independent	1,039	11.01		
Amsterdam IX	W. Oosterbaan	Shopkeepers' Candidate	627	6.64		
Amsterdam IX	Valid		9,440	93.73		
Amsterdam IX	Invalid		632	6.27		
Amsterdam IX	Total votes		10,072	100		
Amsterdam IX	Registered voters/turnout		27,317	36.87		
Apeldoorn	J. R. Snoeck Henkemans	Christian Historical Union	4,695	75.95		
Apeldoorn	P. T. Hugenholtz	Anti-Constitutional Revision	1,487	24.05		
Apeldoorn	Valid		6,182	98.96		
Apeldoorn	Invalid		65	1.04		
Apeldoorn	Total votes		6,247	100		
Apeldoorn	Registered voters/turnout		13,064	47.82		
Appingedam	J. H. A. Schaper	Social Democratic Workers' Party	Unopposed			
Arnhem	K. Eland	Liberal Union	3,088	82.63		
Arnhem	M. C. van Wijhe	Social Democratic Party	649	17.37		
Arnhem	Valid		3,737	98.42		
Arnhem	Invalid		60	1.58		
Arnhem	Total votes		3,797	100		
Arnhem	Registered voters/turnout		9,626	39.45		
Assen	W. O. A. Koster	Free-thinking Democratic League	Unopposed			
Bergen op Zoom	J. F. Juten	General League	Unopposed			
Beverwijk	L. N. Roodenburg	Free-thinking Democratic League	5,145	85.78		
Beverwijk	L. L. H. de Visser	Social Democratic Party	853	14.22		
Beverwijk	Valid		5,998	97.56		
Beverwijk	Invalid		150	2.44		
Beverwijk	Total votes		6,148	100		
Beverwijk	Registered voters/turnout		18,099	33.97		
Bodegraven	J. W. H. M. van Idsinga	Christian Historical Union	Unopposed			
Breda	W. H. Bogaardt	General League	2,882	84.34		
Breda	P. Binkhorst van Oudkarspel	Anti-Constitutional Revision	535	15.66		
Breda	Valid		3,417	98.79		
Breda	Invalid		42	1.21		
Breda	Total votes		3,459	100		
Breda	Registered voters/turnout		8,623	40.11		
Breukelen	F. H. de Monté ver Loren	Anti-Revolutionary Party	Unopposed			
Brielle	A. Roodhuyzen	Liberal Union	2,835	74.78		
Brielle	A. Braat	Country Party	956	25.22		
Brielle	Valid		3,791	97.13		
Brielle	Invalid		112	2.87		
Brielle	Total votes		3,903	100		
Brielle	Registered voters/turnout		8,938	43.67		
Delft	H. A. van de Velde	Anti-Revolutionary Party	Unopposed			
Den Bosch	A. F. O. van Sasse van Ysselt	General League	Unopposed			
Den Haag I	K. ter Laan	Social Democratic Workers' Party	3,755	80.80		
Den Haag I	H. L. Israëls	Anti-Constitutional Revision	584	12.57		
Den Haag I	L. L. H. de Visser	Social Democratic Party	308	6.63		
Den Haag I	Valid		4,647	95.05		
Den Haag I	Invalid		242	4.95		
Den Haag I	Total votes		4,889	100		
Den Haag I	Registered voters/turnout		16,470	29.68		
Den Haag II	J. W. IJzerman	Liberal Union	3,159	70.20		
Den Haag II	P. F. Hubrecht	Independent	929	20.64		
Den Haag II	J. W. Kruyt	League of Christian Socialists	412	9.16		
Den Haag II	Valid		4,500	95.79		
Den Haag II	Invalid		198	4.21		
Den Haag II	Total votes		4,698	100		
Den Haag II	Registered voters/turnout		16,438	28.58		
Den Haag II	J. C. Jansen	Liberal Union	3,803	64.94		
Den Haag III	J. O. de Jong van Beek en Donk	Independent	1,673	28.57		
Den Haag III	L. L. H. de Visser	Social Democratic Party	380	6.49		
Den Haag III	Valid		2,053	97.03		
Den Haag III	Invalid		179	2.97		
Den Haag III	Total votes		2,232	100		
Den Haag III	Registered voters/turnout		19,286	31.29		
Den Helder	P. J. Oud	Free-thinking Democratic League	3,222	51.88		
Den Helder	A. P. Staalman	Christian Democratic Party	2,989	48.12		
Den Helder	Valid		6,211	98.82		
Den Helder	Invalid		74	1.18		
Den Helder	Total votes		6,285	100		
Den Helder	Registered voters/turnout		9,953	63.15		
Deventer	H. P. Marchant	Free-thinking Democratic League	3,121	67.18		
Deventer	J. Stoffel	Anti-Constitutional Revision	1,525	32.82		
Deventer	Valid		4,646	98.56		
Deventer	Invalid		68	1.44		
Deventer	Total votes		4,714	100		
Deventer	Registered voters/turnout		9,572	49.25		
Doetinchem	P. van Vliet	Anti-Revolutionary Party	Unopposed			
Dokkum	R. van Veen	Christian Historical Union	Unopposed			
Dordrecht	P. J. de Kanter	Liberal Union	2,535	75.02		
Dordrecht	A. Besemer	Country Party	474	14.03		
Dordrecht	D. J. Wijnkoop	Social Democratic Party	370	10.95		
Dordrecht	Valid		3,379	95.78		
Dordrecht	Invalid		149	4.22		
Dordrecht	Total votes		3,528	100		
Dordrecht	Registered voters/turnout		11,259	31.33		
Druten	T. J. A. Duijnstee	General League	Unopposed			
Ede	G. J. A. Schimmelpenninck	Christian Historical Union	Unopposed			
Eindhoven	J. van Best	General League	Unopposed			
Elst	A. I. M. J. baron van Wijnbergen	General League	4,276	89.38		
Elst	F. van Eeden	General State Party	508	10.62		
Elst	Valid		4,784	98.36		
Elst	Invalid		80	1.64		
Elst	Total votes		4,864	100		
Elst	Registered voters/turnout		9,805	49.61		
Emmen	J. Sibinga Mulder	Liberal Union	Unopposed			
Enkhuizen	N. Oosterbaan	Anti-Revolutionary Party	Unopposed			
Enschede	J. W. Albarda	Social Democratic Workers' Party	5,614	87.11		
Enschede	D. J. Wijnkoop	Social Democratic Party	831	12.89		
Enschede	Valid		6,445	95.85		
Enschede	Invalid		279	4.15		
Enschede	Total votes		6,724	100		
Enschede	Registered voters/turnout		19,303	34.83		
Franeker	W. P. G. Helsdingen	Social Democratic Workers' Party	2,670	87.31		
Franeker	L. de Baan	League of Christian Socialists	388	12.69		
Franeker	Valid		3,058	98.90		
Franeker	Invalid		34	1.10		
Franeker	Total votes		3,092	100		
Franeker	Registered voters/turnout		8,864	34.88		
Goes	A. F. de Savornin Lohman	Christian Historical Union	Unopposed			
Gorinchem	A. C. Visser van Yzendoorn	League of Free Liberals	Unopposed			
Gouda	W. T. C. van Doorn	Liberal Union	Unopposed			
Grave	D. A. P. N. Koolen	General League	Unopposed			
Groningen	J. Limburg	Free-thinking Democratic League	3,070	58.76		
Groningen	S. van Houten	Anti-Constitutional Revision	1,660	31.77		
Groningen	G. Sterringa	Social Democratic Party	495	9.47		
Groningen	Valid		5,225	97.85		
Groningen	Invalid		115	2.15		
Groningen	Total votes		5,340	100		
Groningen	Registered voters/turnout		12,372	43.16		
Gulpen	C. J. M. Ruijs de Beerenbrouck	General League	Unopposed			
Haarlem	D. Fock	Liberal Union	3,394	78.51		
Haarlem	M. C. van Wijhe	Social Democratic Party	473	10.94		
Haarlem	Z. Kamerling	General State Party	456	10.55		
Haarlem	Valid		4,323	97.78		
Haarlem	Invalid		98	2.22		
Haarlem	Total votes		4,421	100		
Haarlem	Registered voters/turnout		12,132	36.44		
Haarlemmermeer	J. B. Bomans	General League	5,775	81.68		
Haarlemmermeer	J. K. de Blaauw	Anti-Constitutional Revision	1,295	18.32		
Haarlemmermeer	Valid		7,070	98.54		
Haarlemmermeer	Invalid		105	1.46		
Haarlemmermeer	Total votes		7,175	100		
Haarlemmermeer	Registered voters/turnout		15,112	47.48		
Harlingen	J. Ankerman	Christian Historical Union	Unopposed			
Helmond	A. N. Fleskens	General League	Unopposed			
Hilversum	V. H. Rutgers	Anti-Revolutionary Party	5,569	74.86		
Hilversum	W. Heineken	Anti-Constitutional Revision	1,066	14.33		
Hilversum	G. A. Vader	Social Democratic Party	804	10.81		
Hilversum	Valid		7,439	97.66		
Hilversum	Invalid		178	2.34		
Hilversum	Total votes		7,617	100		
Hilversum	Registered voters/turnout		16,638	45.78		
Hontenisse	P. F. Fruijtier	General League	Unopposed			
Hoogezand	P. Rink	Liberal Union	Unopposed			
Hoorn	W. J. E. H. M. de Jong	Liberal Union	3,173	78.35		
Hoorn	B. de Ligt	League of Christian Socialists	877	21.65		
Hoorn	Valid		4,050	98.44		
Hoorn	Invalid		64	1.56		
Hoorn	Total votes		4,114	100		
Hoorn	Registered voters/turnout		9,482	43.39		
Kampen	E. J. Beumer	Anti-Revolutionary Party	Unopposed			
Katwijk	J. T. de Visser	Christian Historical Union	4,290	85.94		
Katwijk	J. H. Ekering	Anti-Constitutional Revision	702	14.06		
Katwijk	Valid		4,992	97.56		
Katwijk	Invalid		125	2.44		
Katwijk	Total votes		5,117	100		
Katwijk	Registered voters/turnout		11,414	44.83		
Leeuwarden	P. J. Troelstra	Social Democratic Workers' Party	4,266	87.42		
Leeuwarden	A. R. de Jong	League of Christian Socialists	614	12.58		
Leeuwarden	Valid		4,880	98.65		
Leeuwarden	Invalid		67	1.35		
Leeuwarden	Total votes		4,947	100		
Leeuwarden	Registered voters/turnout		10,116	48.90		
Leiden	J. E. Heeres	Liberal Union	2,366	84.99		
Leiden	L. L. J. de Visser	Social Democratic Party	418	15.01		
Leiden	Valid		2,784	97.17		
Leiden	Invalid		81	2.83		
Leiden	Total votes		2,865	100		
Leiden	Registered voters/turnout		8,347	34.32		
Lochem	G. Jannink	Liberal Union	4,579	89.15		
Lochem	F. A. J. van Zeijl	Anti-Constitutional Revision	557	10.85		
Lochem	Valid		5,136	98.07		
Lochem	Invalid		101	1.93		
Lochem	Total votes		5,237	100		
Lochem	Registered voters/turnout		10,998	47.62		
Loosduinen	A. Brummelkamp Jr.	Anti-Revolutionary Party	Unopposed			
Maastricht	F. I. J. Janssen	General League	Unopposed			
Meppel	H. Smeenge	Liberal Union	Unopposed			
Middelburg	E. E. van Raalte	Liberal Union	4,448	77.24		
Middelburg	H. C. Hofman	Anti-Constitutional Revision	1,311	22.76		
Middelburg	Valid		5,759	96.58		
Middelburg	Invalid		204	3.42		
Middelburg	Total votes		5,963	100		
Middelburg	Registered voters/turnout		11,885	50.17		
Nijmegen	M. J. C. M. Kolkman	General League	Unopposed			
Ommen	C. J. A. Bichon van IJsselmonde	Independent Christian Historical Union	3,276	78.30		
Ommen	H. J. Kruidenier	Country Party	908	21.70		
Ommen	Valid		4,184	98.61		
Ommen	Invalid		59	1.39		
Ommen	Total votes		4,243	100		
Ommen	Registered voters/turnout		10,876	39.01		
Oostburg	R. R. L. de Muralt	Liberal Union	Unopposed			
Oosterhout	A. B. G. M. van Rijckevorsel	General League	Unopposed			
Rheden	J. R. H. van Schaik	General League	Unopposed			
Ridderkerk	F. J. W. Drion	League of Free Liberals	3,014	74.98		
Ridderkerk	H. J. Kruidenier	Country Party	1,006	25.02		
Ridderkerk	Valid		4,020	97.53		
Ridderkerk	Invalid		102	2.47		
Ridderkerk	Total votes		4,122	100		
Ridderkerk	Registered voters/turnout		9,846	41.86		
Roermond	M. C. E. Bongaerts	General League	Unopposed			
Rotterdam I	B. J. Gerretson	Christian Historical Union	3,764	80.53		
Rotterdam I	J. W. Kruyt	League of Christian Socialists	910	19.47		
Rotterdam I	Valid		4,674	97.38		
Rotterdam I	Invalid		126	2.62		
Rotterdam I	Total votes		4,800	100		
Rotterdam I	Registered voters/turnout		14,867	32.29		
Rotterdam II	H. Spiekman	Social Democratic Workers' Party	3,943	80.39		
Rotterdam II	J. Roeper Bosch	Anti-Constitutional Revision	496	10.11		
Rotterdam II	W. van Ravesteijn Jr.	Social Democratic Party	466	9.50		
Rotterdam II	Valid		4,905	96.06		
Rotterdam II	Invalid		201	3.94		
Rotterdam II	Total votes		5,106	100		
Rotterdam II	Registered voters/turnout		17,453	29.26		
Rotterdam III	B. D. Eerdmans	Liberal Union	1,242	70.01		
Rotterdam III	W. van Ravesteijn Jr.	Social Democratic Party	532	29.99		
Rotterdam III	Valid		1,774	95.94		
Rotterdam III	Invalid		75	4.06		
Rotterdam III	Total votes		1,849	100		
Rotterdam III	Registered voters/turnout		6,715	27.54		
Rotterdam IV	J. van Vollenhoven	League of Free Liberals	4,759	66.59		
Rotterdam IV	P. T. Hugenholtz	Anti-Constitutional Revision	1,247	17.45		
Rotterdam IV	W. van Ravesteijn Jr.	Social Democratic Party	1,141	15.96		
Rotterdam IV	Valid		7,147	97.37		
Rotterdam IV	Invalid		193	2.63		
Rotterdam IV	Total votes		7,340	100		
Rotterdam IV	Registered voters/turnout		25,099	29.24		
Rotterdam V	J. ter Laan	Social Democratic Workers' Party	2,421	84.95		
Rotterdam V	L. L. H. de Visser	Social Democratic Party	429	15.05		
Rotterdam V	Valid		2,850	95.86		
Rotterdam V	Invalid		123	4.14		
Rotterdam V	Total votes		2,973	100		
Rotterdam V	Registered voters/turnout		10,215	29.10		
Schiedam	D. J. de Geer	Christian Historical Union	4,798	87.38		
Schiedam	L. L. H. de Visser	Social Democratic Party	693	12.62		
Schiedam	Valid		5,491	98.35		
Schiedam	Invalid		92	1.65		
Schiedam	Total votes		5,583	100		
Schiedam	Registered voters/turnout		10,922	51.12		
Schoterland	M. Mendels	Social Democratic Workers' Party	2,135	78.75		
Schoterland	H. J. Rijsewijk	Social Democratic Party	576	21.25		
Schoterland	Valid		2,711	98.73		
Schoterland	Invalid		35	1.27		
Schoterland	Total votes		2,746	100		
Schoterland	Registered voters/turnout		8,751	31.38		
Sittard	J. H. J. Beckers	General League	Unopposed			
Sliedrecht	J. van der Molen Tz.	Anti-Revolutionary Party	Unopposed			
Sneek	J. G. Scheurer	Anti-Revolutionary Party	Unopposed			
Steenwijk	L. F. Duymaer van Twist	Anti-Revolutionary Party	Unopposed			
Tiel	H. C. Dresselhuys	League of Free Liberals	Unopposed			
Tietjerksteradeel	C. van der Voort van Zijp	Anti-Revolutionary Party	3,764	81.77		
Tietjerksteradeel	M. C. van Wijhe	Social Democratic Party	839	18.23		
Tietjerksteradeel	Valid		4,603	99.31		
Tietjerksteradeel	Invalid		32	0.69		
Tietjerksteradeel	Total votes		4,635	100		
Tietjerksteradeel	Registered voters/turnout		9,796	47.32		
Tilburg	A. H. A. Arts	General League	Unopposed			
Utrecht I	J. H. W. Q. ter Spill	League of Free Liberals	2,434	67.27		
Utrecht I	A. R. de Jong	League of Christian Socialists	627	17.33		
Utrecht I	H. C. Muller	Anti-Constitutional Revision	557	15.40		
Utrecht I	Valid		3,618	94.37		
Utrecht I	Invalid		216	5.63		
Utrecht I	Total votes		3,834	100		
Utrecht I	Registered voters/turnout		11,049	34.70		
Utrecht II	J. van Leeuwen	Social Democratic Workers' Party	2,555	83.22		
Utrecht II	A. de Hullu	Anti-Constitutional Revision	296	9.64		
Utrecht II	L. L. H. de Visser	Social Democratic Party	219	7.13		
Utrecht II	Valid		3,070	90.77		
Utrecht II	Invalid		312	9.23		
Utrecht II	Total votes		3,382	100		
Utrecht II	Registered voters/turnout		10,086	33.53		
Veendam	G. W. Sannes	Social Democratic Workers' Party	Unopposed			
Veghel	B. R. F. van Vlijmen	General League	Unopposed			
Venlo	W. H. Nolens	General League	Unopposed			
Waalwijk	J. A. Loeff	General League	Unopposed			
Weert	H. A. G. van Groenendael	General League	Unopposed			
Weststellingwerf	F. W. N. Hugenholtz	Social Democratic Workers' Party	2,114	85.73		
Weststellingwerf	J. W. Kruyt	League of Christian Socialists	352	14.27		
Weststellingwerf	Valid		2,466	98.84		
Weststellingwerf	Invalid		29	1.16		
Weststellingwerf	Total votes		2,495	100		
Weststellingwerf	Registered voters/turnout		8,563	29.14		
Wijk bij Duurstede	J. B. L. C. C. baron de Wijkerslooth de Weerdesteyn	General League	Unopposed			
Winschoten	E. A. van Beresteijn	Free-thinking Democratic League	Unopposed			
Zaandam	J. E. W. Duijs	Social Democratic Workers' Party	4,011	79.33		
Zaandam	L. L. H. de Visser	Social Democratic Party	1,045	20.67		
Zaandam	Valid		5,056	97.14		
Zaandam	Invalid		149	2.86		
Zaandam	Total votes		5,205	100		
Zaandam	Registered voters/turnout		13,608	38.25		
Zevenbergen	A. C. A. van Vuuren	General League	Unopposed			
Zierikzee	R. J. H. Patijn	Liberal Union	Unopposed			
Zuidhorn	E. M. Teenstra	Free-thinking Democratic League	3,405	88.28		
Zuidhorn	G. Sterringa	Social Democratic Party	452	11.72		
Zuidhorn	Valid		3,857	98.69		
Zuidhorn	Invalid		51	1.31		
Zuidhorn	Total votes		3,908	100		
Zuidhorn	Registered voters/turnout		9,908	39.44		
Zutphen	F. Lieftinck	Liberal Union	2,475	72.03		
Zutphen	M. C. van Wijhe	Social Democratic Party	961	27.97		
Zutphen	Valid		3,436	95.42		
Zutphen	Invalid		165	4.58		
Zutphen	Total votes		3,601	100		
Zutphen	Registered voters/turnout		9,096	39.59		
Zwolle	F. M. Knobel	League of Free Liberals	3,236	86.22		
Zwolle	H. J. Nijhuis	Social Democratic Party	517	13.78		
Zwolle	Valid		3,753	94.61		
Zwolle	Invalid		214	5.39		
Zwolle	Total votes		3,967	100		
Zwolle	Registered voters/turnout		9,645	41.13		
