= Simon Taco Land =

Dutch politician (1845-1894)

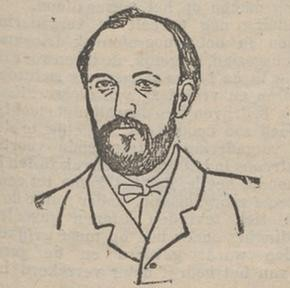
- Portrait of Simon Taco Land from 1894

Member of the House of Representatives
- In office 14 May 1888 – 7 October 1894
- Preceded by: seat created
- Succeeded by: Andries Staalman
- Constituency: Den Helder

Personal details
- Born: 7 November 1845 Franeker, Netherlands
- Died: 7 October 1894 (aged 48) The Hague, Netherlands
- Party: Liberal Union
- Spouse: Johanna Aleide Hendrika Nieuwenhuijs (m. 1877)
- Children: 6
- Education: Royal Netherlands Naval College

Simon Taco Land (7 November 1845 – 7 October 1894) was a Dutch naval officer and politician. He was a member of the Dutch House of Representatives from the Den Helder electoral district from 1888 until his death in 1894, representing the Liberal Union.

== Biography ==
Simon Taco Land was born on 7 November 1845 in Franeker to Gosling Land and Antje Haitsma van der Meulen. He began attending the Royal Netherlands Naval College at Willemsoord in 1861, and graduated in 1867 as lieutenant in the Royal Netherlands Navy. As a naval officer, he participated in the Aceh War, for which he received the Military Order of William 4th class in 1874 and the Expedition Cross and the Aceh Medal in 1875. Land worked as a shipbuilding engineer in Surabaya from 1874 to 1875, and was a teacher of physics and chemistry at the Royal Netherlands Naval College from 1876 to 1886. On 24 May 1877, Land married Johanna Aleide Hendrika Nieuwenhuijs. The couple had six children, four of whom died at a young age. He was commander of the steamer Udun in 1886 and the Pontianak from 1887 to 1888.

In the 1888 Dutch general election, Land, while still on duty off the coast of the Dutch East Indies, was elected to the House of Representatives from the Den Helder electoral district as a liberal candidate. As an MP, he exclusively focused on naval affairs. Land was a supporter of better treatment for lower naval personnel, but was largely unsuccessful in his efforts. He was a Takkiaan, who supported efforts by Johannes Tak van Poortvliet to expand the electoral franchise, and in May 1894 he joined the Progressive Political Group led by Hendrik Goeman Borgesius.

In 1891, Land was refused a promotion by naval minister Hendrik Dyserinck, after Land had written a critical article and was accused by Dyserinck of spreading it among naval personnel. As a consequence, Land submitted a motion of no confidence in Dyserinck, which was successfully passed.

Simon Taco Land died on 7 October 1894 in The Hague.
