= Christian Social Party (Netherlands) =

Defunct political party in the Netherlands

The Christian Social Party (Dutch: Christelijk-Sociale Partij, CSP) was a Protestant Christian left and anti-Catholic political party in the Netherlands founded by Adolf Robbert van de Laar. The CSP played a minor role in Dutch politics, winning a single seat in the 1918 Dutch general election which was taken up by Van de Laar, before its disbandment in 1926, with many CSP members joining the Christian Democratic Union.

== Party history ==
The CSP was founded in 1912 by Adolf Robbert van de Laar. The CSP first participated in the 1913 Dutch general election, where it received 4,500 votes. Although this was not enough for a seat in the House of Representatives, the CSP was credited by contemporaries with splitting the vote and leading to the victory of "left-wing" parties in that election. The party participated again in the 1917 general election without success. In the 1918 general election, the first using a system of proportional representation and universal manhood suffrage, the restriction to get into the House of Representatives was relatively low, one needed more than half of a percent of the vote to be elected. Consequently, the CSP was elected with only 8,000 votes (that is 0.6% of the vote). The CSP's sole MP Adolf Robbert van de Laar played a minor role in Dutch politics. In the 1922 general election, the electoral threshold was raised, and the CSP was unable to maintain its seat. For the 1925 general election, the party was renamed to the Protestant People's Party (Protestantse Volkspartij, PVP), in order to distance the party from its perceived socialist connotations. In 1926, the CSP was disbanded, with some of its members participating in the newly founded Christian Democratic Union along with former members of the Christian Democratic Party and the League of Christian Socialists.

== Ideology and issues ==
The CSP was both an economically left-leaning and a conservative Christian party. The party rejected revolution and class conflict. The CSP was anti-Catholic and rejected the cooperation between the Protestant confessional parties and the Catholic General League. The CSP was generally characterized by contemporaries as left-wing, although the party's leadership rejected the label as well as accusations of being socialist.

Its program combined conservative Protestant proposals with economically leftist ones, including nationalization of core industries, workers' councils in companies and profit sharing. Among the conservative proposals was the proposal to financially privilege the Dutch Reformed Church to maintain the Protestant identity of the Netherlands. Van de Laar was the only MP of a Christian party to vote against the equalization of funding for religious and public schools, which he saw as benefiting "godless" public schools. A notable proposal, for the 1910s, was to enact legislation against the pollution of soil, water and air. The party also supported universal suffrage, including women's suffrage. Although the CSP initially supported a strong national defense, it became increasingly anti-militarist after 1920 and advocated for national disarmament.

== Representation ==
This table shows the election results of the CSP in elections to the House of Representatives, the Senate and the Provinical Councils, as well as the party's political leadership: the fractievoorzitter, the chair of the parliamentary party and the lijsttrekker, the party's top candidate in the general election, these posts are normally taken by the party's leader.

Year	HoR	S	SP	Lead candidate	Parliamentary leader
1918	1	0	0	Adolf Robbert van de Laar	Adolf Robbert van de Laar
1919	1	0	2	no elections	Adolf Robbert van de Laar
1920	1	0	2	no elections	Adolf Robbert van de Laar
1921	1	0	2	no elections	Adolf Robbert van de Laar
1922	0	0	2	Adolf Robbert van de Laar	none
1923	0	0	2	no elections	none
1924	0	0	2	no elections	none
1925	0	0	2	unknown	none
1926	0	0	2	no elections	none

=== Provincial and municipal government ===
The party held several seats in municipal councils and in the Gelderland and Friesland provincial councils.
