= Jan Hoogcarspel =

Dutch politician (1888-1975)

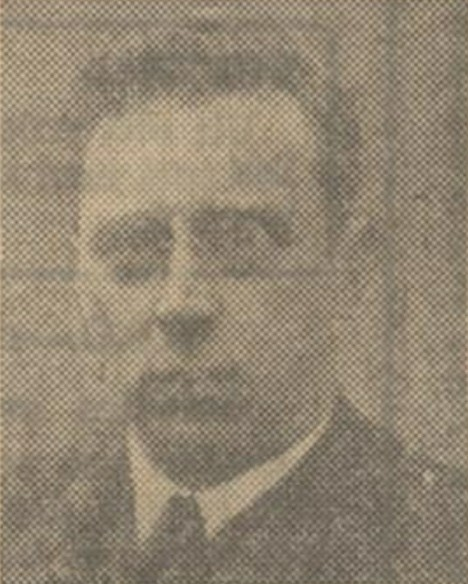
- Jan Hoogcarspel in 1946

Member of the House of Representatives
- In office 4 June 1946 – 15 July 1952

Member of the Provincial Council of South Holland
- In office 6 July 1954 – 6 June 1962

Personal details
- Born: 6 April 1888 Amsterdam, Netherlands
- Died: 20 November 1975 (aged 87) Rotterdam, Netherlands
- Party: SDAP (until 1909); SDP (1909–1918); CPH (1919–1926); CPH-CC (1926-1930); CPN (1945-1958); Brug Group (1958-1959); SWP (1959-1965)
- Spouse: Johanna Broeder (m. 1924)
- Children: 4

Jan Hoogcarspel (6 April 1888 – 20 November 1975) was a Dutch politician. He was a member of the Dutch House of Representatives for the Communist Party of the Netherlands (CPN) from 1946 to 1952 and of the South Holland provincial council from 1954 to 1962.

== Early life ==
Jan Hoogcarspel was born on 6 April 1888 in Amsterdam to Jacob Hoogcarspel, an owner of a tobacco store, and Johanna Catherina de Vries. After attending secondary education in Utrecht, where his father operated a tobacco store, and Haarlem, Hoogcarspel became a bank teller, later finding work as a clerk for the Maatschappij tot Exploitatie van Staatsspoorwegen. During this period, he joined the Social Democratic Workers' Party (SDAP), but after the editors of De Tribune were expelled at an SDAP congress in 1909 Hoogcarspel joined the newly founded Social Democratic Party (SDP), becoming the chairman of the SDP's Utrecht branch.

During this period, Hoogcarspel became interested in economics, eventually gaining qualifications for becoming a teacher in economics and civics in 1912 and 1914. He became a teacher in social sciences at a secondary school in Zaltbommel in 1915, but was fired due to a lack of qualifications. After being fired from another position at a school in Rotterdam due to his leftist politics, he sued the municipality and won. He would continue to work at various schools in Rotterdam and Schiedam until 1954.

== Political career ==
Hoogcarspel continued playing a key role in the SDP (from 1919 the Communist Party Holland; CPH) in Rotterdam into the 1920s. In 1922, he led relief efforts for the 1921-22 Russian famine. During the 1925 crisis in the CPH Hoogcarspel sided with the faction led by David Wijnkoop, and in 1926 he presided over the founding meeting of the Communist Party Holland - Central Committee. When the CPH-CC reunited with the main CPH in 1930, an effort supported by Hoogcarspel on the orders of the Comintern, but was judged unworthy by the Comintern to rejoin. Hoogcarspel spent the next decade focused on his teaching, and wrote two books on civics. During World War II, he participated in the Dutch resistance, becoming involved with the illegal communist newspaper De Waarheid during the later stages of the war.

After the war, Hoogcarspel joined the Communist Party of the Netherlands (CPN), and served in the emergency municipal council of Rotterdam from 1945 to 1946. Hoogcarspel was first elected to the House of Representatives in the 1946 Dutch general election. As an MP, he focused on a wide variety of issues, including finance, social affairs, education, internal affairs, agriculture and overseas territories. He was known in particular as an expert on economic issues, and would continue to advise fellow CPN MP Henk Gortzak even after leaving the House of Representatives in 1952. In 1954, he joined the South Holland provincial council, serving until 1962. During the 1958 party crisis within the CPN, Hoogcarspel sided with the opposition Brug Group, and left the CPN that year, becoming involved with the short-lived Socialist Workers' Party until its demise in 1965.

== Death ==
Jan Hoogcarspel died on 20 November 1975 in Rotterdam.
