= Harm Kolthek =

Dutch politician

Harm Kolthek Jr.
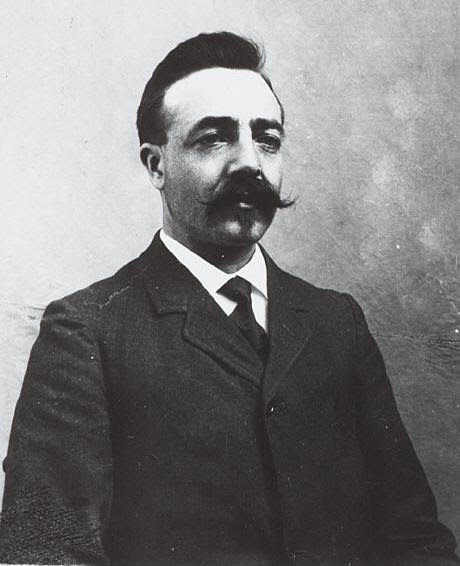

Member of the House of Representatives
- In office 1918–1921

Member of the municipal council of Amsterdam
- In office 1920–1921

Member of the municipal council of Groningen
- In office 1931–1941

Member of the States-Provincial of Groningen
- In office 1935–1941

Personal details
- Born: 10 April 1872 Westerbroek
- Died: 19 January 1946 (aged 73) Groningen
- Party: Socialist Party
- Other political affiliations: Recht en Vrijheid

Harm Kolthek Jr. (1872-1946) was a Dutch printer, journalist, trade unionist and libertarian socialist politician. Kolthek led the syndicalist federation of trade unions, the National Labor Secretariat (NAS), from 1907 to 1913. He later founded and led the Socialist Party, sometimes called the "Kolthek party" after its founder, and served in the Netherlands House of Representatives for this party from 1918 to 1922.

Kolthek was born in 1872 in the village of Westerbroek, the son of Harm Kolthek Sr., factory worker, and Talligje van Eerden. At the age of twenty, he became involved in socialism after his later wife's brother was arrested and abused by hussars at a worker's revolt in Sappemeer; the brother-in-law succumbed to his injuries. In 1907, he became secretary of the NAS, which at the time was coping with financial troubles. Under Kolthek's leadership, the problems were overcome and membership of the NAS tripled. During World War I, Kolthek worked in France as war correspondent for De Telegraaf.

In 1918, Kolthek was elected party leader of the NAS's political arm, the Socialist Party (SP). He was elected to Parliament the same year on the SP's bill. He joined forces with Willy Kruyt of the League of Christian Socialists, but the cooperation did not last.

In 1925, Kolthek moved to Groningen, a city near his native village, for medical reasons: he had a disease of the eye and required treatment, which he found at the city's academic hospital. He returned to (local) politics in 1931, getting elected to the Groningen municipal council on behalf of the Rights and Freedom party (Dutch: Recht en Vrijheid), which he had founded. Both in 1935 and 1939, the party obtained five council seats. Kolthek's 1946 death spelled the end of this party.
