= Communist Party of Holland – Central Committee =

Communist Party of Holland – Central Committee Communistische Partij Holland – Centraal Comité
- Founder: David Wijnkoop; Willem van Ravesteyn; Jan Ceton
- Founded: October 17, 1926
- Dissolved: July 1930
- Split from: Communist Party of Holland
- Merged into: Communist Party of Holland
- Newspaper: De Communistische Gids
- Ideology: Communism
- Political position: Far-left

Communist Party of Holland – Central Committee (Dutch: Communistische Partij Holland – Centraal Comité; Dutch pronunciation: [kɔmyˈnɪstisə pɑrˈtɛi ˈɦɔlɑnt sɛnˈtraːl kɔmiˈteː]), often referred to as CPH–Wijnkoop after one of its main leaders) was a political party in the Netherlands. CPH-CC emerged in 1926, following a major split in the Communist Party of Holland.

== Split ==
The divisions in CPH had emerged in 1925, when the Communist International asked the leadership trio of the party to step down. David Wijnkoop, Willem van Ravesteyn and Jan Ceton had led the party since its foundation in 1909. The trio was accused of not fully implementing decisions given to the party by the International. After their demotion, the group would rally an oppositional tendency within the party. The group was able to gather strong support within the Rotterdam branch of the party, which was van Ravestyen's home turf. As a result, the entire Rotterdam organisation of CPH was expelled from the party. On May 22–24 other followers of van Ravesteyn and Wijnkoop were expelled.

== Formation of CPH-CC ==
In July the group around Wijnkoop started publishing a monthly magazine, De Communistische Gids. On October 17, 1926, the expellees founded the CPH-CC as a separate party. The chairman of CPH-CC was Jan Hoogcarspel and its secretary was J. Mulder. CPH-CC considered itself as the true inheritor of the legacy of CPH. State intelligence sources claimed that around 200-300 CPH cadres had crossed over to CPH-CC.

== 1927 elections ==
In the 1927 municipal elections, CPH-CC fared well in Amsterdam, Rotterdam and the northern parts of the country. In both Amsterdam and Rotterdam the CPH-CC vote-share outnumbered that of the CPH. In Amsterdam the party got 14 446 votes and two seats in the municipal council. In Rotterdam and Opsterland the party won two seats in each council. In Schoterland, Beerta and Finsterwolde the party won three seats in each council.

== Relations with the Communist International ==
Notably amongst its main leaders, differences existed in CPH-CC over which attitude the party should have towards the international communist movement. Wijnkoop strove for recognition by the Communist International to the CPH-CC. Van Ravesteyn on the other hand, opposed rapprochement with the International. However, the international was not interested in recognizing CPH-CC as the legitimate communist party in the Netherlands. The 1928 congress of the Communist International decided to urge the CPH-CC to dissolve itself and that its members ought to return to CPH.

== 1929 election ==
CPH-CC decided to contest the 1929 parliamentary election. The party got 29 860 votes nationwide (0.88%), compared to 37 622 votes for CPH. Both parties won one seat each in the lower chamber. Wijnkoop was elected on behalf of CPH-CC. The party had won 3.8% of the votes in Rotterdam, 2.43% in Amsterdam, 1.48% in Groningen and 1.07% in Friesland.

== Dissolution of the party ==
Following the 1929 election, a general party conference was held in March 1930. The conference decided to move towards a reunification with CPH. Discussion began with the Communist International and CPH, and in the beginning of July the party was disbanded. The majority of its members joined CPH.
