= Socialistische Partij =

Socialistische Partij is Dutch for Socialist Party. It may refer to:

The Netherlands :

- Socialistische Partij (1918-1928), Dutch Socialist Party in the interbellum, dissolved in 1928
- Socialistische Partij (Netherlands), current Dutch Socialist Party in The Netherlands

Belgium :

- Socialistische Partij Anders, Socialist Party of Flanders, Belgium
