= Willy Kruyt =

Dutch politician

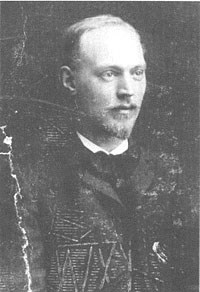

Member of the House of Representatives
- In office 1918–1922

Personal details
- Born: September 8, 1877 Amsterdam, Netherlands
- Died: Ca. July 1943 Berlin, Nazi Germany
- Party: League of Christian Socialists
- Other political affiliations: Communist Party of Holland

Willy Kruyt (né John William Kruyt; 8 September 1877 – July 1943) was a Dutch Protestant minister and Christian socialist, later Communist, politician.

== Background ==
The son of a Dutch publisher and his Scottish wife, Kruyt studied theology at Utrecht and joined the League of Christian Socialists in 1910.

== Early political career ==
In 1913, he was elected chairman of this party; in 1918, he became its only member of the House of Representatives. In the same period, he worked as a Reformed minister at Gennep. He formed an alliance with Willem van Ravesteyn and David Wijnkoop, the two representatives from the Social Democratic Party as well as Harm Kolthek. When, in 1921, the League had disintegrated due to factional struggles between orthodox Protestants and anarchists, Kruyt joined the Communist Party. He stood as a Communist candidate for the 1922 elections, but was not re-elected.

== Later career ==
Following his first wife's death, Kruyt emigrated to Berlin where he joined Workers International Relief, then to Moscow in 1935 (presumably fleeing from the Nazis) to work at the Lenin State Library. Dissatisfied with Stalinism, and deported to Tashkent, he trained as a spy in the hopes of getting back to the Netherlands this way. From England, he parachuted into Belgium in June 1942 with the help of SOE. He broke his leg and was arrested by the German occupiers who detained him at Fort Breendonk.

== Death ==
Kruyt was tortured and deported to the Moabit prison in Berlin where he is thought to have been executed by firing squad in July 1943.

== Family ==
He married Catharina Truus Hogerzeil in 1901 and they had four children; after her death, he married Nelly Dentz and they had two children before their marriage was annulled and he married Gustel Schmidt.
