= Den Helder (electoral district) =

Den Helder was an electoral district of the House of Representatives in the Netherlands from 1888 to 1918.

== Profile ==
The electoral district of Den Helder was created in 1888 out of part of the Alkmaar district, which was reduced from two seats to one. Den Helder's boundaries remained the same throughout the electoral district's existence. Fully located in the province of North Holland, it included the city of Den Helder and the rural municipalities of Anna Paulowna, Callantsoog, Petten and Zijpe to its south, as well of the Wadden Islands of Texel, Vlieland and Terschelling and the island of Wieringen. Roughly a quarter of the district's working age population was connected to the Willemsoord naval base.

The district's population increased slightly during its existence, from 43,483 in 1888 to 49,904 in 1909. A majority of around 60% the population was Reformed, with another 17.5% being Catholic and some 7% being Gereformeerd. The share of "Others" rose from 11.5% in 1888 to 16.4% in 1909.

The district of Den Helder was abolished upon the introduction of party-list proportional representation in 1918.

== Members ==
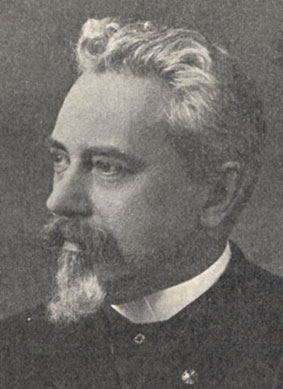
Theo de Meester

Den Helder was represented mostly by Liberal and Free-thinking Democratic members. The only exception is Andries Staalman, who was elected as an Anti-Revolutionary in 1894 and in all subsequent elections, but sat as an independent in parliament. He broke with the party in 1903 and founded the Christian Democratic Party, but subsequently failed to get re-elected. Carel Victor Gerritsen, elected in 1905, died before he was installed as member of parliament.

| Election | Member | Party | Ref |
|---|---|---|---|
| 1888 | Simon Taco Land | Lib | |
| 1891 | Simon Taco Land | Lib | |
| 1891 | Simon Taco Land | Lib | |
| 1894 | Simon Taco Land | Lib | |
| 1894 | Andries Staalman | AR | |
| 1897 | Andries Staalman | AR | |
| 1901 | Andries Staalman | AR | |
| 1903 | Andries Staalman | CD | |
| 1905 | Carel Victor Gerritsen | VD | |
| 1905 | Zadok van den Bergh | VD | |
| 1909 | Theo de Meester | Lib | |
| 1913 | Theo de Meester | Lib | |
| 1917 | Pieter Oud | VD | |
| 1917 | Pieter Oud | VD | |

== Election results ==
=== Elections in the 1880s ===
1888 general election: Den Helder
| Candidate | Party | First round | | Second round | |
| Candidate | Party | Votes | % | Votes | % |
|---|---|---|---|---|---|
| Simon Taco Land | Lib | 1,072 | 38.73 | 1,779 | 63.92 |
| H.W. van Marle | AR | 973 | 35.15 | 1,004 | 36.08 |
| D.C. Loman | Lib | 705 | 25.47 | | |
| Others | | 18 | 0.65 | | |
| Total | | 2,768 | 100.00 | 2,783 | 100.00 |
| Valid votes | | 2,768 | 99.78 | 2,783 | 99.93 |
| Invalid/blank votes | | 6 | 0.22 | 2 | 0.07 |
| Total votes | | 2,774 | 100.00 | 2,785 | 100.00 |
| Registered voters/turnout | | 3,627 | 76.48 | 3,627 | 76.79 |
| Liberal gain | | | | | |
Source: Kiesraad, Huygens Instituut (1, 2)

=== Elections in the 1890s ===
1891 general election: Den Helder
| Candidate | Party | Votes | % |
|---|---|---|---|
| Simon Taco Land | Lib | 1,044 | 73.68 |
| H.W. van Marle | AR | 281 | 19.83 |
| D. de Clerq | V | 62 | 4.38 |
| Others | | 30 | 2.12 |
| Total | | 1,417 | 100.00 |
| Valid votes | | 1,417 | 98.88 |
| Invalid/blank votes | | 16 | 1.12 |
| Total votes | | 1,433 | 100.00 |
| Registered voters/turnout | | 3,725 | 38.47 |
| Liberal hold | | | |
Source: Kiesraad, Huygens Instituut

1891 Den Helder by-election
| Candidate | Party | Votes | % |
|---|---|---|---|
| Simon Taco Land | Lib | 1,099 | 95.23 |
| Others | | 55 | 4.77 |
| Total | | 1,154 | 100.00 |
| Valid votes | | 1,154 | 94.98 |
| Invalid/blank votes | | 61 | 5.02 |
| Total votes | | 1,215 | 100.00 |
| Registered voters/turnout | | 3,725 | 32.62 |
| Liberal hold | | | |
Source: Kiesraad, Huygens Instituut

1894 general election: Den Helder
| Candidate | Party | Votes | % |
|---|---|---|---|
| Simon Taco Land | Lib | 1,021 | 92.99 |
| J. Timmer | Lib | 77 | 7.01 |
| Total | | 1,098 | 100.00 |
| Valid votes | | 1,098 | 96.74 |
| Invalid/blank votes | | 37 | 3.26 |
| Total votes | | 1,135 | 100.00 |
| Registered voters/turnout | | 3,700 | 30.68 |
| Liberal hold | | | |
Source: Kiesraad, Huygens Instituut

1894 Den Helder by-election
| Candidate | Party | First round | | Second round | |
| Candidate | Party | Votes | % | Votes | % |
|---|---|---|---|---|---|
| Andries Staalman | AR | 558 | 28.64 | 1,254 | 55.56 |
| J.J. Kraakman | | 281 | 14.43 | 1,003 | 44.44 |
| H. van Calcar | | 256 | 13.14 | | |
| J.C. Jansen | Lib | 243 | 12.47 | | |
| J.J. Stooker | | 213 | 10.93 | | |
| P.C.F. Frowein | | 158 | 8.11 | | |
| J.G. van den Bosch | | 91 | 4.67 | | |
| J. Korver | AR | 75 | 3.85 | | |
| J.B. Verhey | Lib | 40 | 2.05 | | |
| Others | | 33 | 1.69 | | |
| Total | | 1,948 | 100.00 | 2,257 | 100.00 |
| Valid votes | | 1,948 | 99.69 | 2,257 | 97.16 |
| Invalid/blank votes | | 6 | 0.31 | 66 | 2.84 |
| Total votes | | 1,954 | 100.00 | 2,323 | 100.00 |
| Registered voters/turnout | | 3,711 | 52.65 | 3,711 | 62.60 |
| Anti-Revolutionary gain | | | | | |
Source: Kiesraad, Huygens Instituut (1, 2)

1897 general election: Den Helder
| Candidate | Party | First round | | Second round | |
| Candidate | Party | Votes | % | Votes | % |
|---|---|---|---|---|---|
| Andries Staalman | AR | 2,535 | 48.33 | 2,918 | 54.30 |
| Cornelis Lely | Lib | 1,842 | 35.12 | 2,456 | 45.70 |
| Herman Schaepman | Ka | 775 | 14.78 | | |
| J. Korver | AR | 77 | 1.47 | | |
| J.C. Jansen | Lib | 16 | 0.31 | | |
| Total | | 5,245 | 100.00 | 5,374 | 100.00 |
| Valid votes | | 5,245 | 98.57 | 5,374 | 99.04 |
| Invalid/blank votes | | 76 | 1.43 | 52 | 0.96 |
| Total votes | | 5,321 | 100.00 | 5,426 | 100.00 |
| Registered voters/turnout | | 6,598 | 80.65 | 6,598 | 82.24 |
| Anti-Revolutionary hold | | | | | |
Source: Kiesraad, Huygens Instituut (1, 2)

=== Elections in the 1900s ===
1901 general election: Den Helder
| Candidate | Party | Votes | % |
|---|---|---|---|
| Andries Staalman | AR | 2,683 | 51.53 |
| C.S. Jaring | Lib | 2,138 | 41.06 |
| Frederik Hugenholtz | SDAP | 386 | 7.41 |
| Total | | 5,207 | 100.00 |
| Valid votes | | 5,207 | 99.16 |
| Invalid/blank votes | | 44 | 0.84 |
| Total votes | | 5,251 | 100.00 |
| Registered voters/turnout | | 6,816 | 77.04 |
| Anti-Revolutionary hold | | | |
Source: Kiesraad, Huygens Instituut

1905 general election: Den Helder
| Candidate | Party | Votes | % |
|---|---|---|---|
| Carel Victor Gerritsen | VD | 3,111 | 51.03 |
| Andries Staalman | CD | 2,276 | 37.34 |
| L. Adriaanse | AR | 491 | 8.05 |
| A.H. Gerhard | SDAP | 218 | 3.58 |
| Total | | 6,096 | 100.00 |
| Valid votes | | 6,096 | 98.72 |
| Invalid/blank votes | | 79 | 1.28 |
| Total votes | | 6,175 | 100.00 |
| Registered voters/turnout | | 7,641 | 80.81 |
| Free-thinking Democratic gain | | | |
Source: Kiesraad, Huygens Instituut

1905 Den Helder by-election
| Candidate | Party | Votes | % |
|---|---|---|---|
| Zadok van den Bergh | VD | 3,420 | 53.79 |
| Andries Staalman | CD | 2,938 | 46.21 |
| Total | | 6,358 | 100.00 |
| Valid votes | | 6,358 | 99.07 |
| Invalid/blank votes | | 60 | 0.93 |
| Total votes | | 6,418 | 100.00 |
| Registered voters/turnout | | 7,641 | 83.99 |
| Free-thinking Democratic hold | | | |
Source: Kiesraad, Huygens Instituut

1909 general election: Den Helder
| Candidate | Party | First round | | Second round | |
| Candidate | Party | Votes | % | Votes | % |
|---|---|---|---|---|---|
| Theo de Meester | Lib | 3,128 | 45.77 | 3,891 | 54.25 |
| Andries Staalman | CD | 2,950 | 43.17 | 3,282 | 45.75 |
| C. Thomassen | SDAP | 659 | 9.64 | | |
| F. Fokkens | CHU | 97 | 1.42 | | |
| Total | | 6,834 | 100.00 | 7,173 | 100.00 |
| Valid votes | | 6,834 | 99.17 | 7,173 | 99.35 |
| Invalid/blank votes | | 57 | 0.83 | 47 | 0.65 |
| Total votes | | 6,891 | 100.00 | 7,220 | 100.00 |
| Registered voters/turnout | | 8,402 | 82.02 | 8,402 | 85.93 |
| Liberal gain | | | | | |
Source: Kiesraad, Huygens Instituut (1, 2)

=== Elections in the 1910s ===
1913 general election: Den Helder
| Candidate | Party | First round | | Second round | |
| Candidate | Party | Votes | % | Votes | % |
|---|---|---|---|---|---|
| Theo de Meester | Lib | 2,778 | 37.90 | 3,486 | 58.15 |
| C. Thomassen | SDAP | 2,171 | 29.62 | 2,509 | 41.85 |
| Andries Staalman | CD | 1,220 | 16.64 | | |
| C.J.van der Hegge Spies | AR | 1,161 | 15.84 | | |
| Total | | 7,330 | 100.00 | 5,995 | 100.00 |
| Valid votes | | 7,330 | 99.07 | 5,995 | 98.52 |
| Invalid/blank votes | | 69 | 0.93 | 90 | 1.48 |
| Total votes | | 7,399 | 100.00 | 6,085 | 100.00 |
| Registered voters/turnout | | 9,031 | 81.93 | 9,031 | 67.38 |
| Liberal hold | | | | | |
Source: Kiesraad, Huygens Instituut (1, 2)

1917 Den Helder by-election
| Candidate | Party | First round | | Second round | |
| Candidate | Party | Votes | % | Votes | % |
|---|---|---|---|---|---|
| Pieter Oud | VD | 2,264 | 35.46 | 3,341 | 54.87 |
| C. Thomassen | SDAP | 2,128 | 33.33 | 2,748 | 45.13 |
| Andries Staalman | CD | 1,993 | 31.21 | | |
| Total | | 6,385 | 100.00 | 6,089 | 100.00 |
| Valid votes | | 6,385 | 98.66 | 6,089 | 97.78 |
| Invalid/blank votes | | 87 | 1.34 | 138 | 2.22 |
| Total votes | | 6,472 | 100.00 | 6,227 | 100.00 |
| Registered voters/turnout | | 9,953 | 65.03 | 9,953 | 62.56 |
| Free-thinking Democratic gain | | | | | |
Source: Kiesraad, Huygens Instituut (1, 2)

1917 general election: Den Helder
| Candidate | Party | Votes | % |
|---|---|---|---|
| Pieter Oud | VD | 3,222 | 51.88 |
| Andries Staalman | CD | 2,989 | 48.12 |
| Total | | 6,211 | 100.00 |
| Valid votes | | 6,211 | 98.82 |
| Invalid/blank votes | | 74 | 1.18 |
| Total votes | | 6,285 | 100.00 |
| Registered voters/turnout | | 9,953 | 63.15 |
| Free-thinking Democratic hold | | | |
Source: Kiesraad, Huygens Instituut
