= Harm van Houten =

Dutch politician (1892–1952)

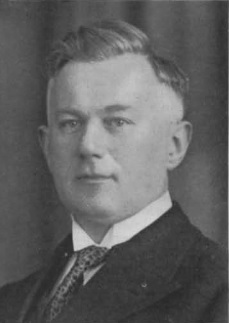
- Harm van Houten

Member of the House of Representatives
- In office 9 May 1933 – 7 August 1945

Personal details
- Born: 19 June 1892 Boksum
- Died: 22 July 1952 (aged 60) Groningen
- Party: ARP (until 1932); CDU (from 1932)
- Spouse(s): Maaike Bruinsma (m. 1917; died 1927) Maria Smallenbroek (m. 1929)
- Children: 9

Harm van Houten (19 June 1892, Boksum, Friesland - 22 July 1952) was a Dutch politician who served as a member of the House of Representatives between 1933 and 1945 for the Christian Democratic Union (CDU).
