= National Labor Secretariat =

Dutch trade union center (1893–1940)

- Nationaal Arbeids-Secretariaat
- Predecessor: Social Democratic League
- Founded: 1893
- Dissolved: 1940
- Affiliations: Red International of Labor Unions (1922-1927)

The National Labor Secretariat (Dutch: Nationaal Arbeids-Secretariaat, NAS) was a trade union federation in the Netherlands from 1893 to 1940.

== Early years ==
In the late 1880s and early 1890s the idea that trade unions should no longer be branches of the Social Democratic League (SDB), as they had been up to this point, became increasingly influential. In 1893, the National Labor Secretariat (NAS) was thus founded. At first, it encompassed both the SDB and the seven unions involved in its founding — the Dutch Cigar Makers' and Tobacco Workers' Union, General Dutch Typographers' Union, the Dutch Furniture Makers' Union, the Brushmakers' Federation, the Carpenters' Federation, the General Dutch Diamond Workers' Union, and the railway union Steeds Voorwaarts. The NAS was declaredly politically neutral, but in practice it was dominated by the SDB.

After the SDB split into the revolutionary Socialist League and the parliamentary Social Democratic Workers' Party (SDAP) in 1894, both remained members and the NAS did not get involved in the conflict between them, but the relations between the NAS and the parties soon deteriorated to the point that in 1896 both the Socialist League and the SDAP were expelled from the NAS, leaving only unions in the organization.

By 1896 thirteen national and 16 local unions were part of the NAS. Conflict soon ensued over the distribution of financial means within the NAS. All unions in the federation had one vote, no matter what their size, but financial contributions to the union funds were on a per capita basis. Moreover, the NAS supported in principle all strikes - be they by NAS members or by non-affiliated unions or even individuals, because all strikes were seen as a learning experience for the working class. The financial shortage that resulted from this as well as increasing anarchist tendencies in the NAS soon led many of the larger unions to leave the organization. By 1903, only fifteen national, but 61 local organizations were part of the NAS.

== Pre-WWI period ==
1903 saw relations between the NAS on the one hand and the SDAP and many of the large non-NAS unions deteriorate further. A successful general strike, which started in January 1903, led to strict laws prohibiting such strikes. A "Resistance Committee" consisting of the NAS, the SDAP, and the General Diamond Workers' Union of the Netherlands (ANDB), the largest non-NAS union in the country, soon fell apart. In late 1903, the SDAP leader Pieter Jelles Troelstra then claimed the NAS was "done for". In 1906, the Dutch Confederation of Trade Unions (NVV) was founded as an SDAP-loyal union federation. It had more members than the NAS from the start.

In the following years the NAS slowly turned to syndicalism. This development was influenced by the competition with the NVV and by Christiaan Cornelissen. Cornelissen, who was influenced by the French syndicalism of the CGT developed a syndicalist theory adapted to the local orientation of the NAS. Nevertheless, the chaotic internal organization of the NAS weakened it until Harm Kolthek took over as national secretary in 1907. Under his leadership, the NAS was able to broaden its base by emphasizing its political and religious neutrality and its membership doubled to 7,200 by 1913. During this time, the NAS also started co-operating with political parties again, specifically it collaborated with the SDAP-breakaway Social Democratic Party on both a transport workers' strike in 1911 and protests against price increases in 1912. As a result of this many anarchists left the organization.

== Post-WWI period ==
Like most European syndicalist unions, the NAS saw its membership boom after World War I. Although the Netherlands were neutral in the war, they were not untouched by it: food shortages plagued the country and the revolutionary wave that swept Europe from 1917 to 1920 left its mark on the country. The massive wave of strikes greatly benefited the NAS, its membership rose from 10,500 in 1916 to 51,000 in 1920. During this time NAS members had great influence on the Socialist and Communist Parties. In 1922, the NAS decided to join the pro-Soviet Red International of Labour Unions (RILU), although many in the federation favored the anarcho-syndicalist International Workers' Association (IWA). In 1923, the question of international affiliation led to a split. About 8,000 members left to found the IWA-affiliated Dutch Syndicalist Trade Union Federation (NSV).

The NAS, however, split from the RILU in 1927 due to fear of Moscow control. After the NAS had seceded from the RILU, it was reaching to the German revolutionary trade-unions and the international revolutionary-syndicalism, which opposed soviet politics. A merge with the NSV failed because the NSV wanted to return to a pure independent foundation, while the NAS executive thought that political and economic struggle were intertwined due to increasing state intervention. Eventually, the communist opposition within the NAS was expelled. As a counterpart of the communist network of unions, the NAS founded additional organizations and an innate political party, the RSP, in 1929.

After 1920, the membership of the NAS waned reaching 13,000 in 1924. Its members were now primarily transport workers, construction workers, and Amsterdam municipal employees. In 1927, the NAS broke with the Communist Party and many of the union's leaders helped form the Revolutionary Socialist Party (RSP) in 1928. A further wave of militancy in the Dutch labor movement helped the NAS gain members in the late 1920s, but in 1933 and 1934 the government took measures against the left after a mutiny on board the cruiser De Zeven Provinciën, dealing the NAS a heavy blow. Municipal employees and civil servants could now be fired for their adherence to the revolutionary movement. In the 1930s the NAS also started turning its back on syndicalism arguing that the idea that the workers should build up a socialist society themselves had failed. Although it continued losing members, the NAS existed until the German occupation of the Netherlands in 1940. The Germans forced the organization to be disbanded, but a few members continued its activities in illegality. After the war, there were no efforts to re-found the NAS.
