= Dutch Syndicalist Trade Union Federation =

Anarcho-syndicalist trade union

- Nederlands Syndicalistisch Vakverbond
- Founded: June 1923
- Dissolved: 1940
- Publication: De Syndicalist
- Affiliations: International Workers' Association

The Dutch Syndicalist Trade Union Federation (Dutch: Nederlandsch Syndicalistisch Vakverbond, NSV) was an anarcho-syndicalist trade union, affiliated with the International Workers' Association (IWA). The NSV had its own magazine called De Syndicalist, which appeared weekly between 1923 and 1940.

== History ==
The NSV was founded in June 1923 after a split in the National Labor Secretariat (Dutch: Nationaal Arbeids-Secretariaat, NAS), which later joined the communist Red International of Labor Unions (RILU), the trade union branch of the Comintern. In the early days of the NSV, there were difficulties in the organization due to the ongoing relationship with the NAS. When the NAS broke with the RVI in 1929, there was an attempt to merge the NAS and the NSV again. Part of the NSV was not in favor of this and founded the Syndicalist Federation of Business Organizations (Dutch: Syndicalistisch Verbond van Bedrijfsorganisaties, SVB). When the merger between the NAS and the NSV nevertheless failed, part of the NSV returned and went along with the remaining SVB members.

The NSV, which joined the IWA in 1922, took a clearly anarcho-syndicalist position in 1929. Membership fell from about 7,500 to about 3,000 in 1929 and about 1,500 in 1940.

In addition to the regular magazine De Syndicalist, the NSV also had the theoretical magazine Grondslagen, which appeared from 1932 to 1935. Grondslagen was seen as the theoretical organ of the NSV and published theoretical and historical works on anarcho-syndicalism. The magazine was published at a time of severe economic and political crisis. Abroad, the Nazis came to power in Germany, the Fascists in Italy, and tensions were building up enormously in Spain.

The anarchists Arthur Lehning and Albert de Jong played an important role in the NSV. Lehning was chief editor of Grondslagen. De Jong was, among other things, a representative for the NSV at the International Workers Association.

== Bibliography ==
- "Inleiding". Grondslagen – Anarcho-syndicalistisch tijdschrift (Jaargang 1–2, 1932–1933) (in Dutch). Amsterdam: Anarchistiese Uitgaven. 1978.
- Het Nederlands Syndicalistisch Vakverbond 1923–1940 (in Dutch). Utrecht: Anarchistische Uitgeverij. 1980.
- van der Tuin, Evert (1973). "Het NSV en het anarcho-syndicalisme". Voor Arthur Lehning – Over Buonarroti, internationale avant-gardes, Max Nettlau en het verzamelen van boeken, anarchistische ministers, de algebra van de revolutie, schilder en schrijvers (in Dutch). Baarn: Het Wereldvenster. pp. 203–238.
- Blom, Ron (2007). De Oude Socialistische partij (in Dutch). ISBN 978 90 5972 227 9.
