= Andries Staalman =

Andries P. Staalman
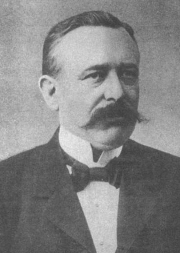

Member of the House of Representatives
- In office 27 November 1894 – 19 September 1905
- In office 17 September 1918 – 24 June 1922

Member of the Den Helder Municipal Council
- In office 1896–1911

Member of the Provincial Council of North Holland
- In office 6 July 1909 – 5 July 1910

Member of the Amsterdam Municipal Council
- In office 15 June 1921 – 15 September 1922

Personal details
- Born: November 2, 1858 Hellevoetsluis, Netherlands
- Died: March 6, 1938 (aged 79) Driebergen-Rijsenburg, Netherlands
- Party: Christian Democratic Union (from 1925)
- Other political affiliations: Anti-Revolutionary Party (1894–1903); Christian Democratic Party (1905–1925)
- Relations: Jan Hendrik Staalman (brother); Abraham Staalman (cousin); Ferdinand Federmann (father-in-law)
- Children: 9
- Parent: Gerrit Staalman
- Occupation: Politician · Council member · Publisher · Journalist · Labour inspector · Plant director

Military service
- Branch/service: Royal Netherlands Army
- Years of service: 1878–1879
- Rank: Militiaman

Andries Popke Staalman (2 November 1858 – 6 March 1938) was a Dutch politician, publisher, journalist, social reform advocate, and founder of the Christian Democratic Party (CDP). Known as a dissident within the Anti-Revolutionary Party (ARP), he became one of the most outspoken champions of conscripts, lower‑ranking naval personnel, fishermen, and fishermen's widows. His persistent advocacy for social justice and expanded suffrage earned him the nickname "the Christian‑democratic conscience of Kuyper."

== Early life ==
Staalman was born in Hellevoetsluis as the second of twelve children of sailmaker Gerrit Staalman, who later became chief sailmaker at the Rijkswerf in Den Helder, and Catharina Jannetje Vosseveld. His family had a history of naval service. His father served forty‑one years in the Royal Netherlands Navy, sixteen of them at sea and twenty‑five as chief of the sailmaking department at the State Shipyard at Willemsoord. His paternal grandfather, Popke Staalman, had been a ship's carpenter, and his great‑grandfather, Jan Hendrik Staalman, was a German who immigrated to the Netherlands where he became a boatswain in the Dutch East India Company (VOC), and subsequently died in the Dutch East Indies. On his mother's side, his grandfather was Commander Andries Vosseveld, commander at the Rijkswerf where Staalman's father worked. Growing up in Den Helder, surrounded by naval workers and shipyard life, Staalman absorbed the culture and hardships of maritime labour from an early age.

After completing primary school, he became a clerk at the municipal collector's office in Nieuwediep at age twelve. He began his military service in 1878, most likely completing it in 1879, serving as a militiaman in his hometown. During this service he witnessed firsthand the poor working and living conditions of lower naval personnel, an experience that shaped his political convictions. He set himself the lifelong goal of improving the circumstances of sailors, conscripts, and shipyard workers, a commitment that would define his career.

=== Post-service ===
After completing his militia service, Staalman used the sixty guilders he had left to open a bookshop and bookbindery in Den Helder, later expanding it into a printing works. Alongside this business he founded the Noord‑Hollandsch Nieuws‑ en Reclameblad Extra Tijding, a sharply written local paper in which he criticised the Royal Netherlands Navy, local authorities, and social injustices. His writing was provocative enough that Extra Tijding was banned aboard naval vessels, and in 1891 he served a three‑week prison sentence after being prosecuted and convicted for insulting a police commissioner and an officer in the paper. His sharp pen and willingness to confront authority made him immensely popular among shipyard workers and lower naval ranks, who saw him as their defender.

Staalman married Elisabeth Federmann, daughter of Ferdinand Federmann, on 19 March 1885; the couple had six daughters and three sons. He was raised in a religious environment and became affiliated with the orthodox Protestant sect "Assembly of the Faithful" regarding the Bible as the guiding principle of his life. Politically he was drawn to the Anti-Revolutionary Party, which at the time presented itself as an advocate for the poor and socially vulnerable.

== Political life ==
In Den Helder, traditionally a liberal constituency, he organised Anti-Revolutionary supporters through the electoral association Nederland en Oranje, later also establishing the ARP's central electoral association for the district. He was elected to the Den Helder municipal council from 1896 to 1911 and to the Provincial Council of North Holland from 1909 to 1910. In the 1894 by‑election he ran as an ARP candidate at the last minute and, thanks to overwhelming local support, was elected to the House of Representatives, becoming the youngest MP at the time. Although elected under the ARP banner, he did not join the ARP parliamentary club, instead forming a one‑man faction. Observers noted that he belonged to a "genus of Christian Democrats with a redder tint than the Kuyperians."

He was re‑elected in 1897 and 1901, often due to his personal popularity rather than party support. From the outset he emphasised the social question, advocating expanded state involvement in social welfare, universal suffrage, improved conditions for naval personnel, and protection for fishermen and fishermen's widows. He also introduced baked wheat rolls as rations for Dutch soldiers and sailors, believing the existing navy rations insufficient; these rolls became known as "Staalmannetjes" and became a household name among military personnel.

=== Clashes with Political Rivals ===
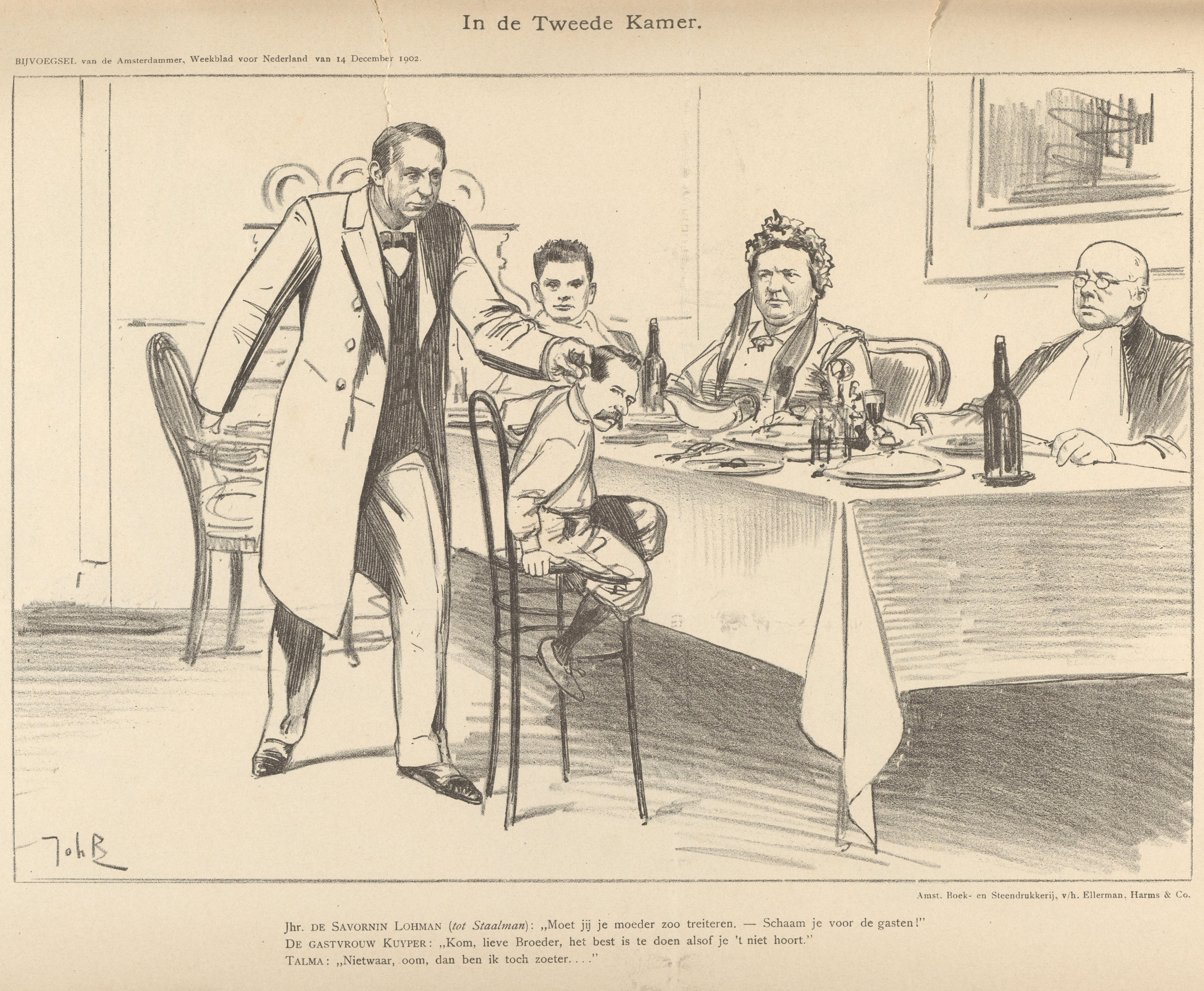
One of the caricatures of Staalman in the De Amsterdammer weekly, depicting him as a bothersome child at the political table (1902)

Staalman frequently clashed with the ARP leadership, particularly Abraham Kuyper, whom he accused of abandoning earlier commitments to social reform. During the Kuyper cabinet (1901–1905), he voted against the ARP in 44 out of 91 votes, 33 of them entirely alone. His dissent included opposing the draft Militia Act in 1901, opposing an amendment to the Labour Act in 1902, and supporting a Drucker amendment to limit night‑work exemptions in herring smokehouses. His criticism provoked hostility within the ARP. A second ARP association, Vaderland en Oranje, was created in Den Helder to counter him, and some party members even suggested "tying Staalman to a mattress and sending him to the man‑eaters of New Zealand."

In 1902 he co‑founded the weekly De Christen‑Democraat with Tiemen de Vries, widening the rift with the ARP. In 1904 his supporters formed the Union of Christian Democratic Propaganda Clubs. After the ARP rejected proposals for expanded suffrage, including household suffrage, Staalman resigned from the party. On 24 April 1905 he founded the Christian Democratic Party (CDP) with the help of his brother Jan Hendrik Staalman, the program included household suffrage, compulsory sickness, old‑age, and disability insurance, and progressive social reforms. In the 1905 elections the CDP failed to win a seat, and Staalman lost to liberal democrat C.V. Gerritsen. The split cost the ARP enough votes that the Kuyper cabinet lost its majority, something Kuyper later blamed on Staalman's ‘disloyalty and apostasy.’ From 1914 to 1918 he served as a civil servant in the Central Labour Inspectorate, further deepening his involvement in labour issues.

After the introduction of proportional representation, Staalman returned to the House of Representatives from 1918 to 1922 as CDP leader. He also served on the Amsterdam municipal council from 1921 to 1922 before resigning due to moving to Bussum. He continued to advocate for widows and orphans of soldiers, lower naval personnel, and social welfare legislation. He contested elections repeatedly, often narrowly losing, including defeats in 1905, 1909, 1913, and twice in 1917 to the young Pieter Oud. The CDP failed to meet the electoral threshold in 1922 and 1924, and in 1925 Staalman dissolved the party and became the lead candidate for the Christian Democratic Union.

== Later life and legacy ==
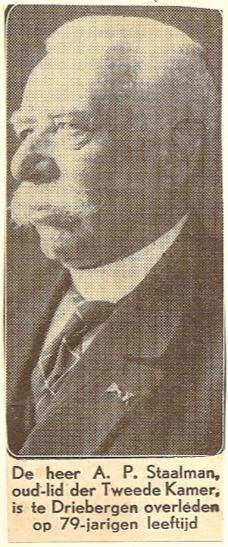
Staalman's portrait in his obituary (1938)

After retiring from national politics, Staalman moved to Driebergen, where he became director of the Fleming potato drying plant. He remained respected in Den Helder, especially among fishermen and widows whom he had long supported. He died in Driebergen-Rijsenburg on 6 March 1938 at the age of 79. At his funeral, representatives of the Heldersche Visschersvereeniging honored his lifelong service to the fishing community.

Staalman is remembered as a provocative but principled advocate for social justice, a defender of the "little people," a pioneer of Christian‑democratic social thought, and a persistent critic of conservative tendencies within the ARP. Though his electoral base remained small and regionally concentrated, his influence on Dutch political debates, especially regarding suffrage and social welfare, was significant. Anecdotes about him include bringing a pan of pea soup into Parliament so the minister could taste what soldiers were fed, sailors calling their smaller rations "Staalmannetjes", and exasperating the aristocratic mayor of Den Helder with long, accusatory council speeches. He authored numerous articles, commentaries, and pamphlets, including Social Democratic Nonsense. Open Letter to F. van der Goes (1893), A Socialist in the Trap, or Socialism and Providentism, Have the Hogerhuis Brothers Really Been Convicted Innocent? (1899), and The Christian Democratic Party (1909), as well as extensive writings in Extra Tijding and De Christen‑Democraat.
