= Christian Democratic Union (Netherlands) =

Political party in the Netherlands (1926–1946)

Christian Democratic Union Christelijk-Democratische Unie
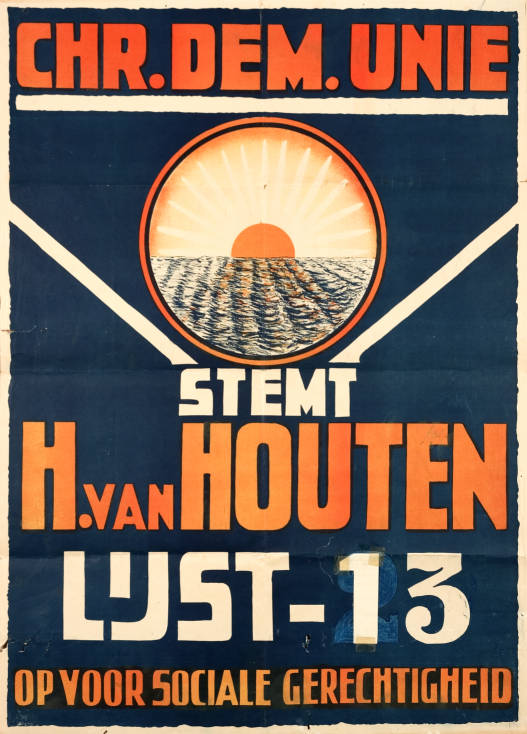
- Abbreviation: CDU
- Leader: Harm van Houten
- Founded: 11 December 1926
- Dissolved: 8 February 1946
- Merger of: Christian Social Party; Christian Democratic Party; League of Christian Socialists
- Merged into: Labour Party
- Newspaper: De Strijder; De Christen-democraat
- Ideology: Christian democracy Christian pacifism Christian left Christian socialism
- Political position: Left-wing
- Religion: Reformed Churches in Repaired Union

The Christian Democratic Union (Dutch: Christelijk-Democratische Unie, CDU) was a minor progressive Protestant political party in the Netherlands during the interwar period.

== History ==
The CDU was formed in 1926 as a merger of three even smaller Christian left-wing parties, the Christian Social Party, the Christian Democratic Party and the League of Christian Socialists. It had one seat between 1929 and 1937 and two between 1937 and 1946. The party always was in opposition.

It was linked to the minor denomination Reformed Churches in Restored Association (Dutch: Gereformeerde Kerken in Hersteld Verband), which had split from the Reformed Churches in the Netherlands in 1926. The Synod of the aforementioned denomination decreed disciplinary measures against members of the CDU in 1936.

After World War II, the party co-founded the Labour Party (PvdA). In the 1950s, many former CDU members left to join the Pacifist Socialist Party because of the PvdA's support for the Dutch government's decision to join NATO and its attempts to suppress the independence movement in Indonesia by means of military force.

== Ideology ==
The CDU stood for a just society based on biblical rules. The party's principles were based on the work of reformed theologian Karl Barth. It was a left-wing party to the extent that it was opposed to war in any form and demanded radical redistribution of income, nationalisation of core industries and influence of workers on corporations. It was in favour of Christian democracy to the extent that it wanted to keep the Sabbath.

== Electoral results ==
=== House of Representatives ===
House of Representatives
Election	Leader	Votes	%	Seats	+/–
1929	Harm van Houten	12,407	0.38%	0 / 100	
1933	Harm van Houten	38,459	1.03%	1 / 100	▲1
1937	Harm van Houten	85,004	2.09%	2 / 100	▲1
