= Willem van Ravesteyn =

Dutch politician

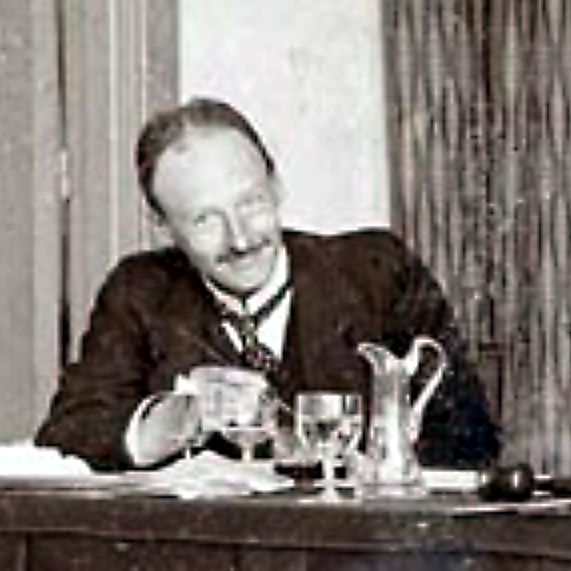
Willem van Ravesteyn, 1911

Willem van Ravesteyn (15 October 1876 in Rotterdam – 10 June 1970 in Rotterdam) was a Dutch Communist politician and historian.

Ravesteyn studied history at the University of Leiden and was involved in setting up the local branch of the Dutch Social Democratic Workers' Party (SDAP) in 1898. With David Wijnkoop and Jan Ceton he was on the editorial board of the left-wing Marxist newspaper De Tribune when it was set up in October 1907. However, Pieter Jelles Troelstra and Willem Vliegen, the reformist leaders of the SDAP, found this unacceptable and organised a special congress to discuss throwing out De Tribune from the party. They were able to get a clear majority for this at the congress held on February 14, 1909. The De Tribune group founded the Social Democratic Party (SDP) on March 14, 1909.

He was elected to the House of Representatives in 1918 and was an MP until 1926, although he left the Communist Party Holland (the successor of the SDP) in 1925. He was also a local councillor in Rotterdam from 1919 to 1927. He was curator of the Rotterdam Municipal Library.

In 1928 he wrote a critical review of Herman Gorter's epic poem Pan which he described as a "tragic failure".

== Texts ==
- De oorlog en de Internationale (1915)
- Herman Gorter, de dichter van Pan: een heroïsch en tragisch leven Rotterdam: Brusse (1928)
- De wording van het communisme in Nederland 1907-1925 (1948)
