= Christian Democratic Party (Netherlands) =

Defunct political party in the Netherlands

The Christian Democratic Party (Dutch: Christen-Democratische Partij, CDP) was a Dutch left-wing Christian-democratic political party. The CDP played only a minor role in parliament. It is historically linked to both the Labour Party and the Christian Democratic Appeal.

== Party History ==
Between 1894 and 1901, Andries Staalman was a member of the House of Representatives for the district of Den Helder. He was a member of the main Reformed party, the Anti-Revolutionary Party (ARP). He operated on the left of the ARP and he advocated increased government interference in the economy and the extension of suffrage. In the 1901 general election, Staalman was re-elected to the House of Representatives on an Anti-Revolutionary ticket, but he was dissatisfied by the party's conservative course. Staalman therefore sat as an independent anti-revolutionary. He was dissatisfied with the conservative composition and programme of the Kuyper cabinet which had formed after the elections and did not support it.

Before the 1905 general election, Staalman founded the Christian Democratic Party to contest the election. He was unable to win a seat. Between 1909 and 1917, Staalman contested several other elections. In the 1917 general election, Staalman was narrowly defeated by Pieter Oud in the Den Helder seat. In the 1918 general election, the first held under a system of proportional representation and universal manhood suffrage, the threshold for admission to the House of Representatives was relatively low, one needed more than half of a percentage of the vote to be elected. Consequently, the CDP was elected with only 10,000 votes (or 0.8% of vote). Staalman played only a minor role in parliament.

In the 1922 general election, the threshold to enter parliament was raised, and the CDP was unable to maintain its seat. The CDP also entered in the 1925 general election without result. The party fell apart, some members returning to the Anti-Revolutionary Party, while others joined the newly founded Christian Democratic Union along with former members of the Christian Social Party and the League of Christian Socialists.

== Ideology and issues ==
The CDP was a left-wing Christian democratic party. It was a reformist and rejected both class conflict and the privileged position of some classes over others. Unlike the ARP, it did not reject cooperation with non-religious parties.

It had a traditional left-wing programme, involving the extension of suffrage to all householders, the implementation of mandatory insurance against sickness and invalidity (an early form of the welfare state), progressive taxation and stronger rights for workers.

== Representation ==
This table shows the election results of the CDP in elections to the House of Representatives, the Senate and the provincial councils, as well as the party's political leadership: the parliamentary leader and the lead candidate in general election. These posts are normally taken by the party's leader.

Year	HoR	S	SP	Lead candidate	Parliamentary leader
1918	1	0	0	Andries Staalman	Andries Staalman
1919	1	0	2	no elections	Andries Staalman
1920	1	0	2	no elections	Andries Staalman
1921	1	0	2	no elections	Andries Staalman
1922	0	0	2	Andries Staalman	none
1923	0	0	1	none	none
1924	0	0	1	none	none
1925	0	0	1	unknown	none
1926	0	0	1	none	none

=== Provincial & municipal government ===
The party held several seats in municipal councils and in the Provincial Council of North Holland.
