= Theo de Meester =

Dutch politician (1851–1919)

His Excellency Theo de Meester
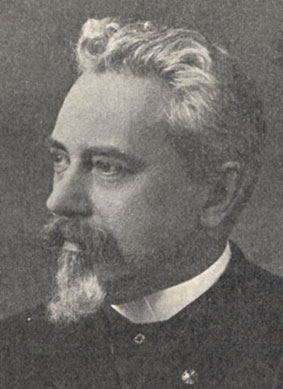
- De Meester in 1905

Chairman of the Council of Ministers
- In office 17 August 1905 – 12 February 1908
- Monarch: Wilhelmina
- Preceded by: Abraham Kuyper
- Succeeded by: Theo Heemskerk

Member of the Council of State
- In office 24 April 1917 – 27 December 1919
- Vice President: Wilhelmus Frederik van Leeuwen

Leader of the Liberal Union in the House of Representatives
- In office 22 September 1913 – 30 March 1917
- Preceded by: Hendrik Goeman Borgesius
- Succeeded by: Eduard Ellis van Raalte

Member of the House of Representatives for Den Helder
- In office 9 May 1910 – 30 March 1917
- Preceded by: Zadok van den Bergh
- Succeeded by: Pieter Oud

Minister of Finance
- In office 17 August 1905 – 12 February 1908
- Prime Minister: Himself
- Preceded by: Jan Harte van Tecklenburg
- Succeeded by: Maximilien Kolkman

Personal details
- Born: Theodoor Herman de Meester; 16 December 1851 Harderwijk, Netherlands
- Died: 27 December 1919 (aged 68) The Hague, Netherlands
- Party: Liberal Union
- Spouse: Josina Parker (m. 1881)
- Children: 2 sons and 1 daughter
- Education: Utrecht University (Bachelor of Laws, Master of Laws)
- Occupation: Politician · Civil servant · Economist · Accountant · Nonprofit director · Editor · Author

Theodoor Herman "Theo" de Meester (16 December 1851 – 27 December 1919) was a Dutch politician of the Liberal Union and economist. He served as Chairman of the Council of Ministers from 17 August 1905 until 12 February 1908.

De Meester was the son of Gerrit Abraham de Meester (1817–1864), who had been a member of the House of Representatives for the Zwolle constituency from 1862 to 1864. A former administrator in the Dutch East Indies, De Meester's cabinet was inaugurated on 17 August 1905. It consisted of five Liberal, two Free-minded Democratic, and two non-partisan ministers. It had no majority in either of the two Dutch chambers, and earned the nickname "Porcelain Cabinet". His government first resigned in December 1906, when the defence budget for 1907 was rejected by the Senate. That resignation was refused by Queen Wilhelmina, but the government fell in December 1907, when the Dutch parliament disapproved the defence budget for 1908. The government remained as a demissionary government until 12 February 1908.

Civic offices
Preceded by Jan Philip van Bosse	Treasurer-General; 1898–1905	Succeeded by Rudolf Patijn
House of Representatives of the Netherlands
Preceded by Zadok van den Bergh	Member for Den Helder; 1910–1917	Succeeded by Pieter Oud
Party political offices
Preceded by Hendrik Goeman; Borgesius	Parliamentary leader of the Liberal Union in the House of Representatives; 1913–1917	Succeeded by Eduard Ellis van Raalte
Political offices
Preceded by Jan Harte van Tecklenburg	Minister of Finance; 1905–1908	Succeeded by Maximilien Kolkman
Preceded by Abraham Kuyper	Chairman of the Council of Ministers; 1905–1908	Succeeded by Theo Heemskerk
