= Socialist Party (Netherlands, interbellum) =

Socialist Party Socialistische Partij
- Abbreviation: SP
- Secretary: Harm Kolthek
- Founder: Harm Kolthek
- Founded: 1918
- Dissolved: 1928
- Preceded by: Social Democratic League
- Succeeded by: Revolutionary Socialist Party
- Trade union wing: National Workers' Secretariat
- Ideology: Libertarian socialism Syndicalism
- Political position: Far-left
- House of Representatives (1918-1922): 1 / 100

The Socialist Party (Dutch: Socialistische Partij, SP), also called the "Kolthek party" after its founder Harm Kolthek, was a Dutch revolutionary syndicalist political party. It was represented in Parliament between 1918 and 1922.

== Party History ==
The Socialist Party was founded in 1918 as the political arm of the syndicalist trade union National Workers' Secretariat (Nationaal Arbeiders' Secretariaat). All its founders had their personal background in the free socialist movement of Ferdinand Domela Nieuwenhuis. The secretary of the NAS, Harm Kolthek, became the top candidate of the SP. In the 1918 election the threshold for admission to the House of Representatives was relatively low, at just over half of 1% of the vote. Consequently, the SP was elected with only 9,000 votes (that is 0.7% of vote).

In parliament, the party worked together with League of Christian Socialists and the Social Democrat Party (later Communist Party Holland) in the revolutionary parliamentary party. This cooperation was not very productive and soon Kolthek became more independent.

In 1922, after the election laws were made more stringent, the SP was unable to retain its seats. Increased competition from the Communist Party Holland and the anarchist Rapaille Party also inhibited electoral success. Meanwhile the power of the CPH over the NAS began to grow. In 1928 the party was officially dissolved. The party also competed in unsuccessfully in the 1925 elections. In 1929 most of its former members joined the Revolutionary Socialist Party of Henk Sneevliet.

== Ideology & Issues ==
The SP was a revolutionary syndicalist libertarian socialist party. It sought to end private ownership in general and combat the ruling class.

The SP wanted to abolish indirect taxation and implement a system of strongly progressive income taxes. It wanted to end child labour and night shifts and reduce the working day to eight hours. It believed that education should be free of charge.

It wanted to replace monarchy by a republic, abolish secret diplomacy, the army and the navy. It supported independence for the Dutch Indies.

Furthermore the party wanted equal rights for men and women. It also sought to combat alcoholism.

== Representation ==
This table shows the SP's results in elections to the House of Representatives and Senate, as well as the party's political leadership: the fractievoorzitter, is the chair of the parliamentary party and the lijsttrekker is the party's top candidate in the general election; these posts are normally taken by the party's leader.

Year	HoR	S	Lijsttrekker	Fractievoorzitter
1918	1	0	Harm Kolthek	Harm Kolthek
1919	1	0	no elections	Harm Kolthek
1920	1	0	no elections	Harm Kolthek
1921	1	0	no elections	Harm Kolthek

=== Municipal Government ===
In the municipal elections of 1919, the party won seats in several municipal legislatures including, Amsterdam, Zaanstad and Vlissingen

== Electorate ==
The electorate of the SP was concentrated in the lower classes. It drew its main support from the region around Amsterdam.
