= Joseph Wijnkoop =

- Born: Joseph David Wijnkoop; 14 August 1842; Amsterdam, Netherlands
- Died: 1 October 1910 (aged 68); Amsterdam
- Occupations: Rabbi, lecturer
- Spouse: Dientje Nijburg
- Children: David Wijnkoop

Joseph David Wijnkoop (14 August 1842 in Amsterdam – 1 October 1910 in Amsterdam) was a Dutch rabbi and scholar in Jewish studies. He was a pupil of Rabbi Jacob Moses Content (1818–1898). Among the Jews of Amsterdam, he was known and respected for his liberal and practical ideas.

== Life ==
Wijnkoop was born in a family of small retailers. He studied at the Dutch Israelite Seminary, a religious school related to the Ashkenazi Jews. He also studied Classical language at the University of Amsterdam. Wijnkoop was the first trainee rabbi who did both academical courses, before it became mandatory. In 1870, he finished his studies at the Jewish Seminary and was rewarded the "Moré-diploma", the highest degree available.

Later in 1870 he was appointed rabbi at the Nederlands-Israëlietische Hoofdsynagoge, the Ashkenazi-Jewish community of Amsterdam. He was the successor of rabbi Joseph Tsewie Hirsch. From 1901, he was also lecturer in the New-Hebrew at the University of Amsterdam.

In 1902, Wijnkoop was also appointed as Chief Rabbi of Amersfoort. He resigned this post in 1904, because it was incompatible with his work as rabbi in Amsterdam. Due to his very bad relationship with the chief rabbi of Amsterdam Joseph Hirsch Dünner, it is likely that he forced Wijnkoop out of this post.

Another position he held was that of board member of the Etz Chaim of Beth Hamidrasch.

In 1902, Wijnkoop was invested as a Knight of the Order of Orange-Nassau.

Joseph Wijnkoop died in 1910, aged 68.

== Books ==
Wijnkoop has written several books, including commentaries on Bible books:

- Handleiding tot de kennis der Hebreeuwsche taal ; 1888-1901, two volumes First volume also translated in English: Manual of Hebrew Syntax by Rev. J. D. Wijnkoop, Translated from the Dutsoh by Rev. Dr. C. van den Biesen, prof. of Theology at St. Joseph's Foreign Missionary College, Mill-Hill.
- Beknopt leerboek der Hebreeuwsche taal voor eerstbeginnenden, 1891
- Eenige opmerkingen naar aanleiding der profetie van Hosea; 1907

== Personal ==
Wijnkoop was married with Amalia (Dientje/Milia) Nijburg. They got four children, two sons and two daughters, including David Wijnkoop.
