= Carel Victor Gerritsen =

Dutch politician (1850–1905)

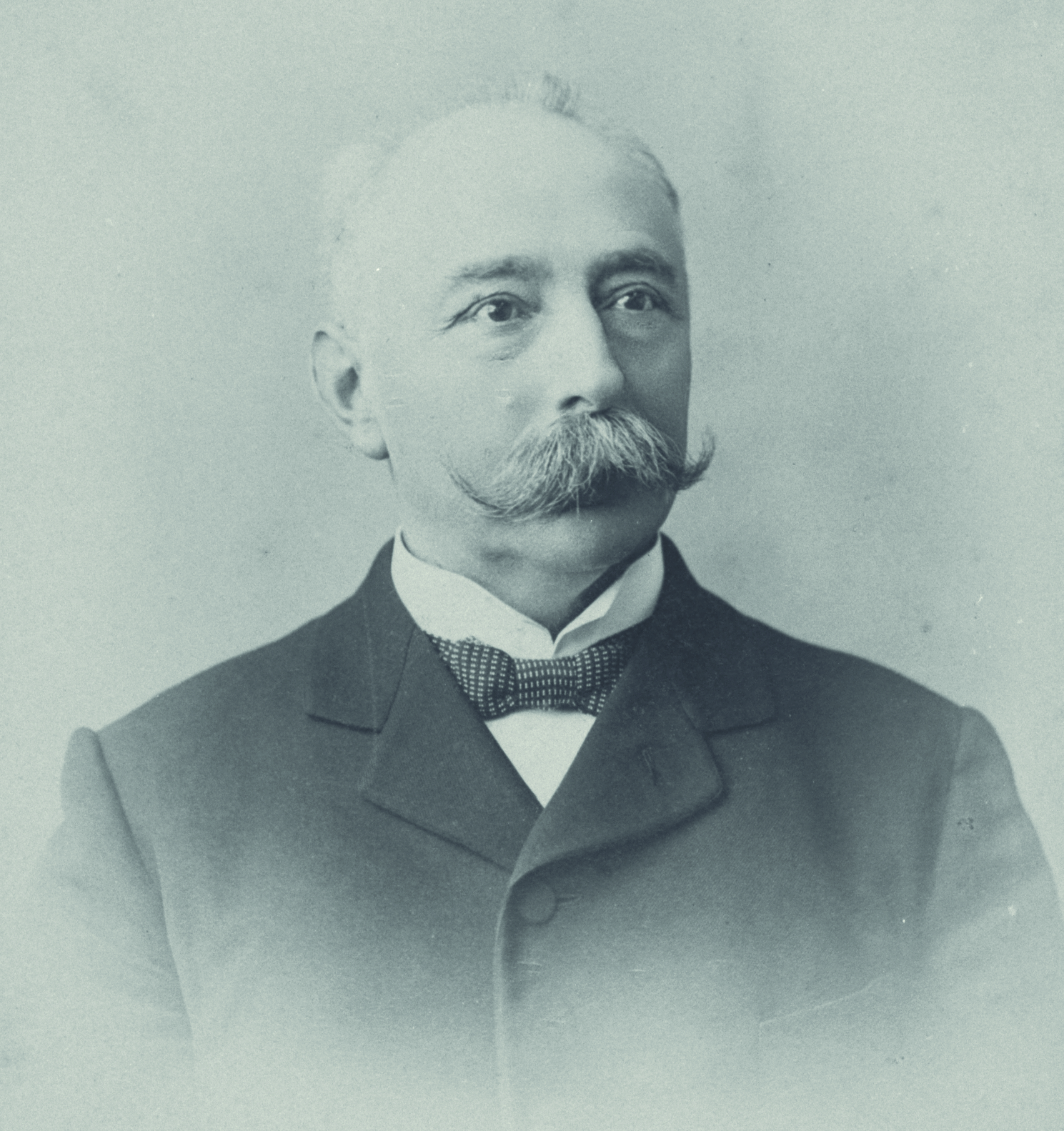
- Carel Victor Gerritsen

Member of the Second Chamber of the States General
- In office 28 February 1893 – 21 September 1897
- Monarch: Wilhelmina
- Preceded by: Johannes Zaaijer
- Succeeded by: Hendrik Pyttersen
- Constituency: Leeuwarden

Member of the Provincial Council of North Holland
- In office 3 July 1901 – 5 July 1905

Alderman in Amsterdam
- In office 6 September 1899 – 2 September 1902

Personal details
- Born: 2 February 1850 Amersfoort, Netherlands
- Died: 5 July 1905 (aged 55) Amsterdam, Netherlands
- Party: Radical League (1892–1901)
- Other political affiliations: Free-thinking Democratic League (after 1901)
- Spouse: Aletta Jacobs
- Children: 1

Carel Victor Gerritsen (2 February 1850 – 5 July 1905) was a Dutch politician known for his radical views. The husband of Aletta Jacobs, he was a proponent of open government, fair wages and birth control. He served as an alderman in Amsterdam and a representative in the States of North Holland. He helped found many radical organisations in the Netherlands including the Neo-Malthusian League, the Radical League and the Free-thinking Democratic League.

== Early life ==
Gerritsen was born on 2 February 1850 in Amersfoort, the second son of Hendrik Aloijsius Gerritsen and Elisabeth Brasser Gerritsen (née Rijss). His father was a successful grain trader and the family pious members of the Dutch Reformed Church. After attending primary school, he went to Amsterdam to study at the Inrichting voor Onderwijs in Koophandel en Nijverheid (Institution for Education in Commerce and Industry), with the intention of returning to help run his father's successful grain trading business. However, before returning to Amersfoort, he decided to travel to Groningen in 1866 to widen his experience.

At that time, Groningen was a hotbed for radicalism. At the same time as gaining business skills, Gerritsen also developed his radicalism. Although he probably never met Eduard Douwes Dekker, who visited the city in 1868, Gerritsen was influenced by his ideas. When he returned to Amersfoort, he formally broke with the church in 1869 and joined the freemasons, becoming master of the Haarlem Masonic lodge Vicit Vim Virtus in 1871. Soon after, he moved to London. While there, he met Annie Besant, Charles Bradlaugh and Charles Vickery Drysdale, and gained acquaintance with other radicals. His thought increasingly combined Douwes Dekker's thinking, as an atheist, feminist and freemason, with the philosophy of the English clergyman Thomas Robert Malthus and he came to be identified with Neo-Malthusianism.

== Return to Amersfoort ==
When his father fell ill, Gerritsen returned to Amersfoort in 1874 to run the family business with his brother. He continued to be involved in freemasonry and between 1875 and 1878 was active as a master of ceremonies, treasurer and court master in the Amersfoort lodge named after Jacob van Campen. In 1875, he also started collecting the library for which he became famous. He joined De Dageraad (The Dawn), rising to be treasurer in 1880, and became a member of the editorial staff of the society journal, also named De Dageraad, in 1882.

On 20 September 1881, Gerritsen was elected to the Amersfoort council. From the beginning, he was noted for his radicalism. Like Bradlaugh, he objected to taking the customary oath when taking office. He took it under protest but was subsequently instrumental in getting the obligation removed in 1895. Once in office, he pushed for council minutes to be published and meetings to take place in the evening so that local people could attend. His criticism of the council led to resignations of a mayor and an alderman. It was while at Amersfoort that Gerritsen first met Paul Kruger, the President of the South African Republic, in 1884.

== Political career in Amsterdam ==
In August 1885, Gerretsen moved to Amsterdam, then a centre for European radicalism. He joined a group of young radicals called Jong Amsterdam ("Young Amsterdam") under the pseudonym Hack van Oudheusden and quickly gained prominence for his writing. The group produced a radical manifesto including calls for universal suffrage, free primary education, separation of church and state, and the development of self-government in the colonies. On 11 July 1888, he was elected to the Amsterdam council. He collaborated with both liberals and church representatives who shared his goals. He was an advocate of municipal ownership of utilities, the vetting of companies for public contract on the basis of the payment of fair wages, and corporate responsibility for pensions.

He helped form the Radical League on 6 November 1892 to represent these views in parliament. On 28 February 1893, he was elected a member of the Second Chamber of the States General for the Leeuwarden electoral district, and was re-elected on 16 May 1894. He served until 21 September 1897.

On 6 September 1899, Gerretsen was appointed an alderman in Amsterdam with responsibility for the care for the poor, trade institutions and the pension agency. As an alderman, he came to be known primarily for his work reforming the local medical service. His reorganisation brought all medical, surgical and obstetric into public control, meaning doctors would now be permanent employees of the municipality. This brought him into conflict with the medical profession.

In 1901, Gerretsen helped found the Free-thinking Democratic League, which duly selected him to run for office. He was elected as member of the States of North Holland from 3 July 1901 to 5 July 1905 for the Amsterdam IX constituency. He was subsequently elected by the Den Helder district but died before he could take up the responsibility.

== Neo-Malthusianism and feminism ==
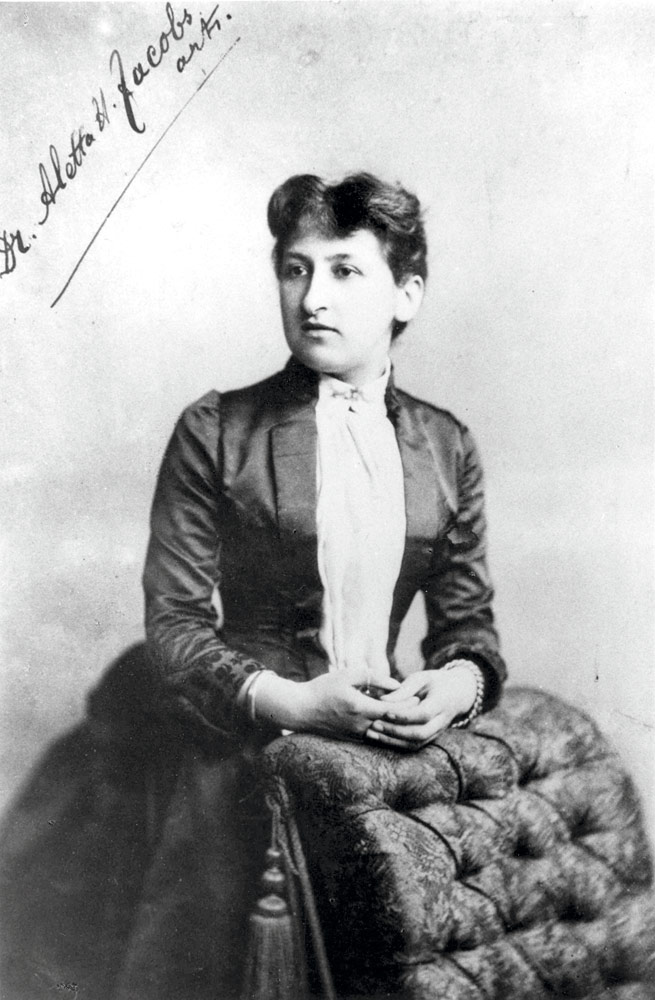
Gerritsen's wife Aletta Jacobs in 1880

Gerritsen believed that unchecked population growth was at the root of many of society's problems. However, unlike Malthus, he believed that technology, particularly contraception, should be the main check to this growth. In 1880, he met Aletta Jacobs, the first female doctor in the Netherlands since the enlightenment, who helped him understand the biology of birth control. With Bernardus Hermanus Heldt and Jan Martinus Smit, he co-founded the Nieuw-Malthusiaansche Bond (Neo-Malthusian League or NMB) on 2 November 1881. The society's aim was to reduce poverty by balancing family size with the available means for subsistence, with information on contraception a means to this end. He travelled extensively with his wife to promote these values, attending the 1904 International Council of Women and subsequently touring the United States shortly before his death.

== Personal life ==
Gerritsen was a believer in free marriage and for many years declined marrying his life companion Aletta Jacobs. When they did marry in 1892 to legitimise their future children, she took the then radical step of retaining her maiden name. Their only child, born on 9 September 1893, died only one day old. Gerritsen died on 5 July 1905 from cancer. As it was at the time illegal in the Netherlands, he was cremated in Hamburg.

== Legacy ==
Gerritsen's legacy has largely been overshadowed by his more famous wife. Originally intended for Amsterdam University Library, in 1903 his library of over 18,000 books and 13,000 pamphlets was sold to the John Crerar Library and shipped to Chicago for an undisclosed sum. Along with his wife's collection, it was subsequently expanded and purchased by the University of Kansas in 1954. The Gerritsen Collection has become an important resource for feminist researchers.

== Selected works ==
=== Sole author ===
- Gerritsen, C. V. (1879). Een krachtig middel ter bestrijding van armoede en lage lonen [A powerful means to combat poverty and low wages] (in Dutch). Amersfoort, The Netherlands.
- Gerritsen, C. V. (1887). De Nederlandsche Bank. Haar verleden en haar toekomst [The Dutch Bank: Past and Future] (in Dutch). Amsterdam, the Netherlands: Brinkman & van der Meulen.

=== Joint author ===
- Gerritsen, C. V.; Jacobs, Aletta H. (1906). Brieven Uit En Over Amerika [Letters from and about America] (in Dutch). Amsterdam, the Netherlands: F. van Rossen. OCLC 633889659.
