= League of Christian Socialists =

Dutch Christian socialist political party

League of Christian Socialists Bond van Christen-Socialisten
- Abbreviation: BCS
- President: Jan Janze (1907–1909); Daan van der Zee (1909–1914); Willy Kruyt (1914-1921)
- Founded: July 13, 1907
- Dissolved: April 2, 1921
- Merged into: Christian Democratic Union
- Newspaper: Opwaarts
- Ideology: Christian socialism Christian left Christian pacifism Anticapitalism; Marxism; Republicanism
- Political position: Left-wing to Far-left
- Religion: Protestantism

The League of Christian Socialists (Dutch: Bond Christen-Socialisten, or BCS) was a Dutch Christian socialist political party.

== Party history ==
The BCS was founded in 1907. In the 1918 elections, the first election with a system of proportional representation and male universal suffrage the threshold for the House of Representatives was relatively low, at just over half of 1% of the vote. Consequently the BCS was elected with only 8000 votes (that is 0.6% of vote).

In parliament the party worked together with Socialist Party and the Social Democrat Party (later Communist Party Holland) in the revolutionary parliamentary party. In 1919 the SP MP had left the parliamentary party, disaffected with the cooperation. The BCS representative however embraced the cooperation and left his own party with to join the Communist Party Holland. Some members joined him, while others joined the social-democratic SDAP, a third group continued separately and founded the Christian Democratic Union with the Christian Social Party and the Christian Democratic Party in 1926.

== Ideology and issues ==
The BCS was both a Marxist and a Christian party. In its manifesto of principles called "God, Thyself, Thy neighbour", the BCS took the second commandment of Christ from the Gospel of Matthew, "Thou shall love thy neighbour like thyself", as its leading principle.

The party had a traditional socialist program, including the abolition of monarchy and the Senate, equal rights for men and women, free education, the implementation of better labour laws, a minimum wage and social security, disarmament, legalisation of conscientious objection against military service and independence of the Dutch Indies.

== Representation ==
This table shows the BCS's results in elections to the House of Representatives and Senate, as well as the party's political leadership: the fractievoorzitter, the chair of the parliamentary party and the lijsttrekker, the party's top candidate in the general election, these posts are normally taken by the party's leader.

Year	HoR	S	Lijsttrekker	Fractievoorzitter
1918	1	0	Willy Kruyt	Willy Kruyt

== Electorate ==
The BCS had only limited support, which it drew primarily from lower-class Protestants.
