= David Wijnkoop =

Dutch communist politician (1876–1941)

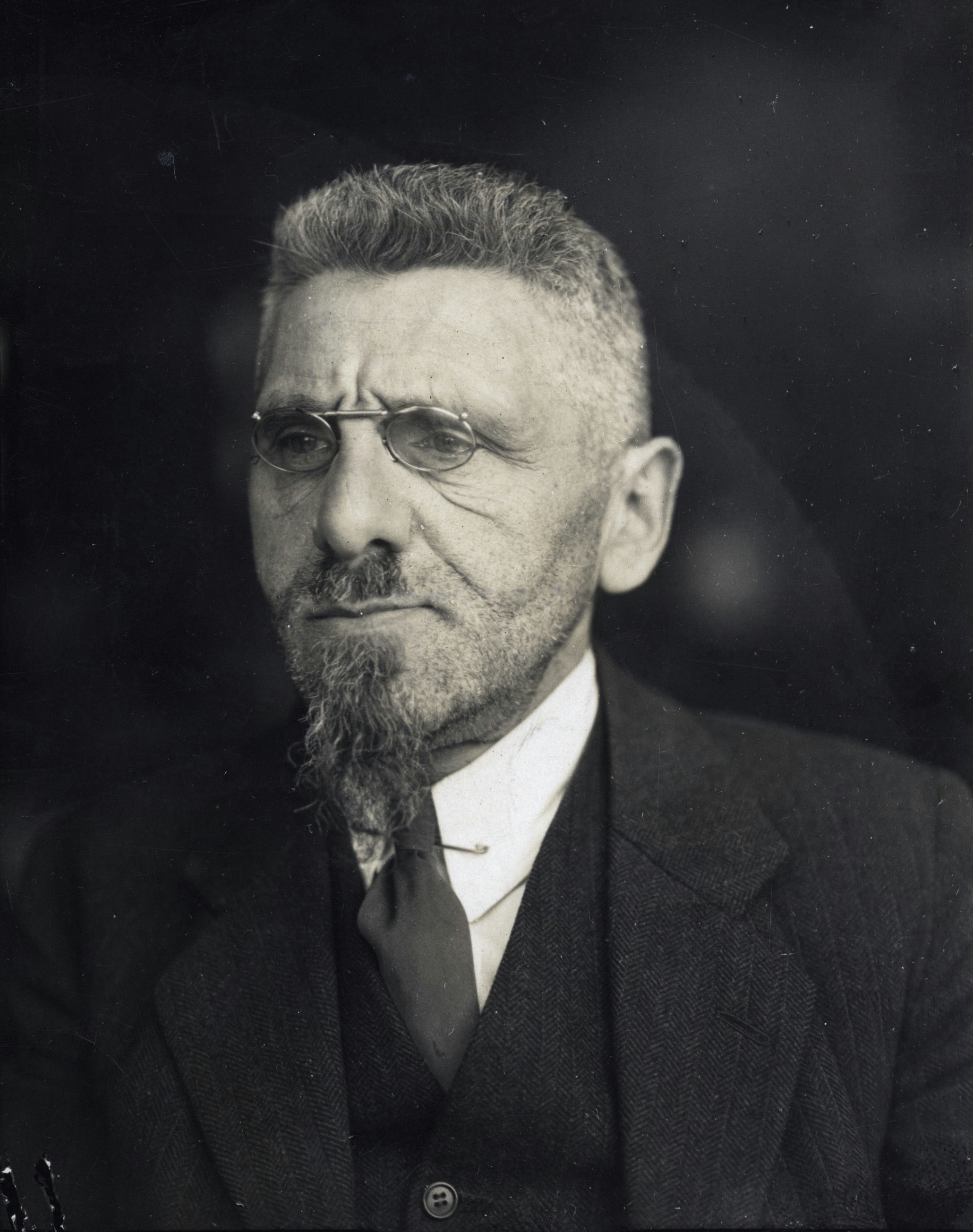

Executive of the Social Democratic Workers' Party
- In office 1905–1906

Party chair of the Communist Party of the Netherlands
- In office 1912–1924

Member of the House of Representatives of the Netherlands
- In office 1918–1925
- In office 1929–1941

Member of the city council of Amsterdam
- In office 1919–1940

Parliamentary group leader in the House of Representatives of the Communist Party of the Netherlands
- In office 1919–1925

Parliamentary group leader in the city council of Amsterdam of the Communist Party of the Netherlands
- In office 1919–1940

Executive of the Comintern
- In office 1924 – 1925 (?)

Member of the States of North Holland
- In office 1927–1939

Personal details
- Born: 11 March 1876 Amsterdam, Netherlands
- Died: 7 May 1941 (aged 65) Amsterdam, Netherlands
- Party: SDAP (1899–1909); SDP (1909–1918); CPH (1919–1925); CPH-Wijnkoop (1926–1930); CPH (1930–1935); CPN (from 1935)
- Spouse(s): Emma Josephine Hess (1907–1910); Johanna ("Joosje") van Rees (1912–1941)
- Occupation: Politician, journalist
- Parlement.com

David Joseph Wijnkoop (Dutch pronunciation: [ˈdaːvɪt ˈʋɛiŋkoːp]; 11 March 1876 – 7 May 1941) was a Dutch communist leader in the first half of the twentieth century.

== Life ==
He was the eldest son of Rabbi Joseph Wijnkoop and Dientje Milia Nijburg. At the Barlaeus Gymnasium, he was not accepted as a member of the school association Disciplina Scipio Vitae because he was a Jew.

He joined the Social Democratic Workers' Party, or the SDAP, in 1898 and broke with it in 1909 and was, with Jan Ceton, co-founder of the Social Democratic Party, predecessor of the Communist Party of the Netherlands. Wijnkoop was the leader of the Communists in the years around World War I. He agitated fiercely against the Social Democrats and organized demonstrations in Amsterdam at the Amsterdam SDAP-alderman Florentinus Marinus "Floor" Wibaut. He left the CPH in 1925, but returned to it later.

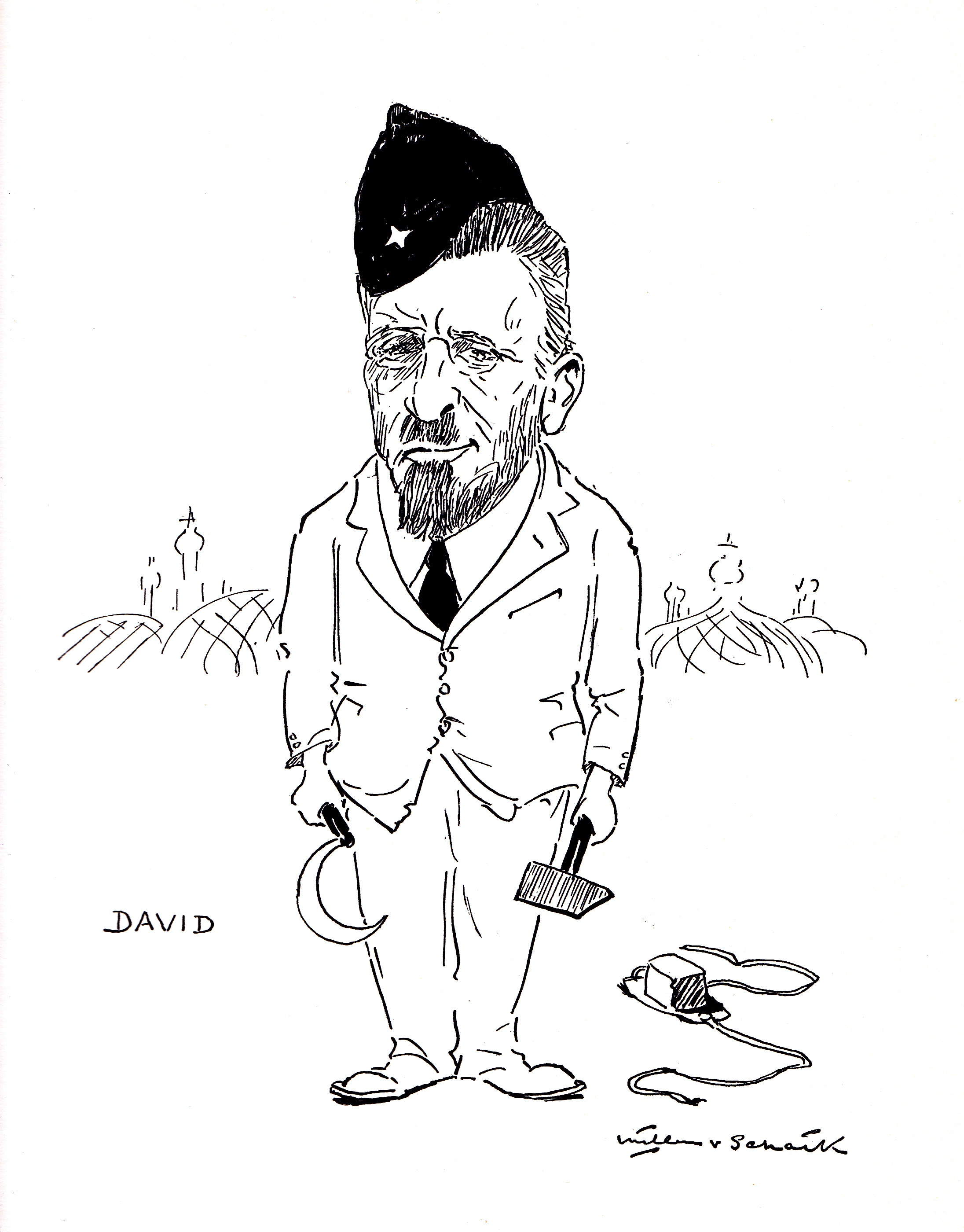
Caricature of Wijnkoop by Willem van Schaik, c. 1937

Wijnkoop interpellated notably starting in 1918, with the government's action against German Crown Prince Wilhelm, and the action of the mayor of Amsterdam in connection with the movements that took place and the situation in the Netherlands in connection with Germany. This continued in 1919, against Minister of Foreign Affairs Herman van Karnebeek on the presence of the former German emperor Wilhelm in the Netherlands, the transit of German troops through Limburg and the persecution of Jews in Poland and Galicia. This continued later into the year, when he talked with Van Karnebeek about the negotiations of the Dutch authorities with various German authorities. After a year of no notable action in 1920, in 1921, Wijnkoop interpellated against Van Karnebeek again, this time to provide support to the starving workers and peasants in Soviet Russia. Then, in 1922 and 1924, he showed further Communist sympathies by pressuring minister of the Dutch government Simon de Graaff of the persecution against Communists in Dutch East Indies, and against minister Gerardus Jacobus van Swaaij on the pay cut for railway staff, respectively.

In 1924, he pressured de Graaff again, this time after the government of the British Raj announced measures to combat the popular movement of workers and peasants in India. After going without much notable action for about 4 years, he came up again, this time against Prime Minister Charles Ruijs de Beerenbrouck about the violent clashes between police and workers following a strike in a zinc oxide factory in Maastricht. Then, the next year, he interpellated against Minister of Justice, Jan Donner, on Communists' homes being searched, and then in 1931, against Donner again, this time on the banning of The Tribune from public reading rooms and from station bookshops.

In 1932, Wijnkoop targeted Dutch Envoy to China Frans Beelaerts van Blokland on the Dutch attitude towards the situation in Shanghai., and later in 1932 against minister John Paul Reymer on the wages of railway employees and the proposed wage reductions. Afterwards, in 1935, he worked against Minister of Public Works Otto Van Lidth de Jeude, in support of the interference of government in the conflict with privately owned mines.

In 1938, he fought against government minister Jacob Patijn on the recognition of the King of Italy as Emperor of Ethiopia. In 1939, he clashed with the government again, this time against Minister of Justice Carel Goseling on the cooperation of the Netherlands to supply the needs of Spanish refugees during the Spanish Civil War. Finally, in 1939, he talked with Prime Minister Hendrikus Colijn about the cause of the resignation of the Minister of Finance and the resulting consequences of his resignation.

In 1931, Wijnkoop initiated a proposal to combat the adverse effects of the economic crisis on the workers. However, the proposal was withdrawn in 1932. In 1907 Wijnkoop founded, together with Jan Cornelis Ceton and Willem van Ravesteyn, a magazine, called The Tribune. Together, with the rest of the Tribune group, he left the SDAP and founded the Social Democratic Party, which in 1919 changed its name to Communist Party of Holland, or the CPH.

In 1925, Wijnkoop left the CPH, together with a number of supporters. The conflict was related to the growing pains of the party, but also with the wish to get a "workers deputy" in parliament instead of van Ravesteyn. He sided with Ravesteyn. With the support of the Communist International, the minority in this conflict managed to win and Wijnkoop left.

On Prinsjesdag 1932, he and fellow Communist Louis de Visser interrupted the Throne Speech from Queen Wilhelmina by shouting. This was countered by other MPs loudly singing the national anthem. In 1934, Wijnkoop and de Visser did the same, only to be forcibly removed from the Ridderzaal where the speech was read.

While in hiding from the Germans during World War II, Wijnkoop suffered a fatal heart attack. Many people, including wanted communists, socialists and Jews, showed up at his funeral. Wijnkoop's widow, Johanna van Rees, was angry Louis de Visser showed up at the funeral while he was wanted, but still asked him to make the graveside speech. It was the last public speech made by de Visser, who did not survive the war.

== Career overview ==
- Inspector at Workers Insurance Company De Centrale, from 1904 to 1907 (resigned after conflict with the director FWN Hugenholtz)
- Editor at De Tribune, from October 1907 to and April 1916 (co-founder)
- Remunerated propagandist at SDP, from 1909 to 1916
- Head editor at De Tribune, from 1916 to 1925
- Member of the House of Representatives from September 1918 to September 1925
- Member of Amsterdam's city council, from September 1919 to 30 July 1940 (removed from the council by the Germans because of his Jewish ancestry)
- Editor of the Communistische Gids, from 1926 to 1930
- Member of States-Provincial North Holland, from July 1927 to July 1939
- Member of the House of Representatives, from September 1929 to 7 May 1941 (died in office, while in hiding)
- Interned in Hoorn, from 10 May 1940 to 15 May 1940
- Hiding in Amsterdam, from July 1940 to 7 May 1941

== Education ==
As a young man, Wijnkoop attended several schools. He started at the Henry Wester Primary School, located at the Weesperplein in Amsterdam. From there he went to the Barlaeus Gymnasium, where he came across the anti-Jewish incident, described earlier. Later he studied Arts at the Amsterdam Municipal University until April 14, 1899. He never finished this study, due to his social and political activities under the influence of Ferdinand Domela Nieuwenhuis.

== Addresses ==
There are several addresses known of Wijnkoop. The first was his parental home at the Plantage Kerklaan in Amsterdam. During his marriage with Emma Hess (1907–1910), he lived on the Nieuwe Herengracht 10, also in Amsterdam. After his marriage breakdown he decided to look for new horizons and lived in London for a while. When he married with Joosje van Rees, he lived on Pretoriusplein 3 III.
