= Jan Ceton =

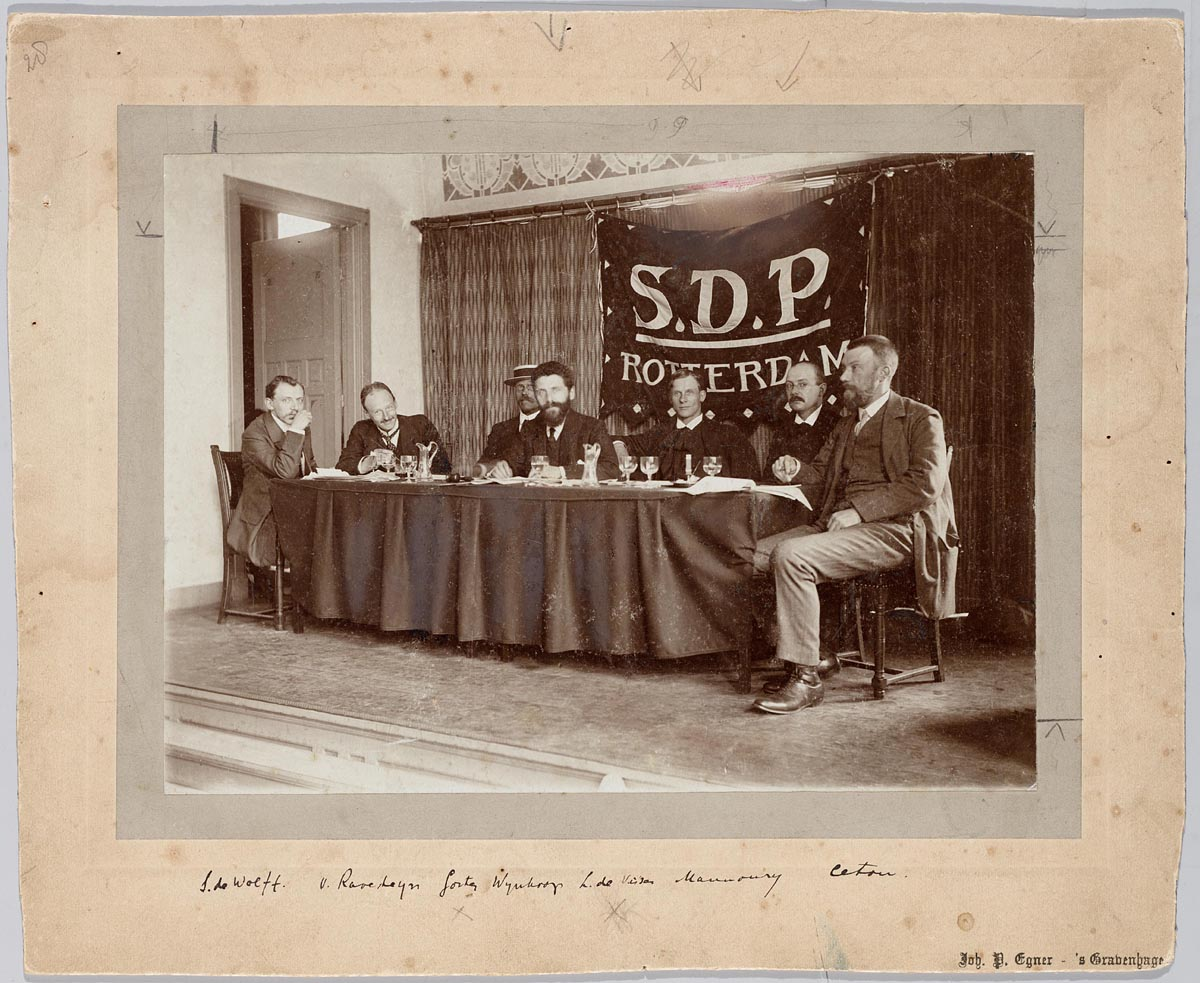
Group portrait of SDP leaders in 1911, Jan Ceton seated on the far right

Jan Ceton (13 May 1875, Bodegraven – 21 January 1943, Amerongen) was a Dutch left-wing politician involved with both the Social Democratic Workers' Party and the Communist Party of the Netherlands. Ceton is best known as one of the founders of the Social Democratic Party, which later provided the core of the Communist Party of the Netherlands.

== Background ==
His father, Huijg Ceton, was descended from an English or Scottish soldier who had been stationed in Schoonhoven around 1620. His family were convinced they were descended from Huguenots and turned the name into 'Seton' or 'Ceton'. They traditionally worked as coppersmiths. His mother, Maria Sterk, came from a family of artisans and farmers. However Ceton's father broke with tradition becoming a teacher at the public primary school in Bodegraven.

Ceton decided to follow his father into teaching. In September 1890 he enrolled as a student at the Dutch National School for Teachers in Haarlem. Although he was considered one of the best youngsters of his year he failed to get his teaching certificate as a primary school teacher in April 1894. In October he successfully retook the exams and started in January 1895 as a teacher at the public primary school in Alphen aan den Rijn. By studying in his spare time he gained full qualifications as a teacher in October 1898. Then on 1 June 1899 he was employed as a schoolteacher at School 130 Amsterdam, later Kastanjeplein school in Oosterparkbuurt.

== Approach to pedagogy ==
As a young teacher, Ceton opposed too strong an emphasis on book wisdom. He took the school children on long nature walks advocated this form of pedagogy during meetings of teachers from the Oude Rijn area. He wrote about butterflies for the magazine De Levende Natuur (Living Nature) of Eli Heimans, Jasper Jaspers and Jac. P. Thijsse. This interest nature led him to resist the existing form of Christian education, and more generally the social relations in society. The Calvinist dominance in the local area led the municipalities to marginalize public primary education.

His friend, C. Bijkerk, a teacher in Oudshoorn and later an activist with the Social Democratic Workers' Party, publicly campaigned against this in the local magazine De Rijnbode, also exposing the deplorable social conditions of the working class. Ceton became departmental secretary of the Nederlandsch Onderwijzers Genootschap (Dutch Education Association).
