= Groningen (electoral district) =

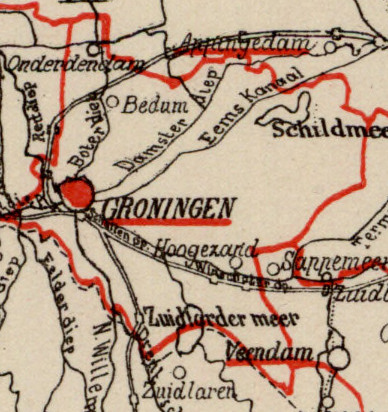
The district of Groningen in 1888

Groningen was an electoral district of the House of Representatives in the Netherlands from 1848 to 1918.

== Background ==
Groningen was created as a single-member district in 1848 and briefly became a two-member district in 1888 before being reverted to a single-member district in 1897. It was named after the city of Groningen. In the first period, the municipalities of Groningen and Haren were consistently part of the district, while it also contained the municipalities of Adorp, Hoogezand, Hoogkerk, Noorddijk, Sappemeer, Winsum and Ten Boer at various points. As a two-member district, Groningen included the municipalities of Groningen, Haren, Hoogezand, Noorddijk, Ten Boer, Bedum and Slochteren. In 1897, it was reconstituted as an exclusively urban single-member district containing only the municipality of Groningen; all other municipalities were moved to the newly created district of Hoogezand.

Throughout its first iteration, Groningen's population increased slightly from 21,459 in 1848 to 23,424 in 1878. In 1888, after the district's considerable enlargement, the district had a population of 90,573. After it was reduced again to include only the municipality of Groningen, its population increased from 66,537 in 1897 to 74,613 to 1909. From 1848 to 1869, the district's religious makeup was fairly stable, with around 72–75% of the population being Dutch Reformed, 13–15% being Roman Catholic, 1–5% being Gereformeerd, and another 9–11 % belonging to other denominations. From 1878 onward, the share of people identifying with the Dutch Reformed Church fell to 46% in 1909, while the share of people identifying as Gereformeerd rose to 14%, and the "others" grouping rose to 28%, which included 17% not belonging to any denomination.

The district of Groningen was abolished upon the introduction of party-list proportional representation in 1918.

== Members ==
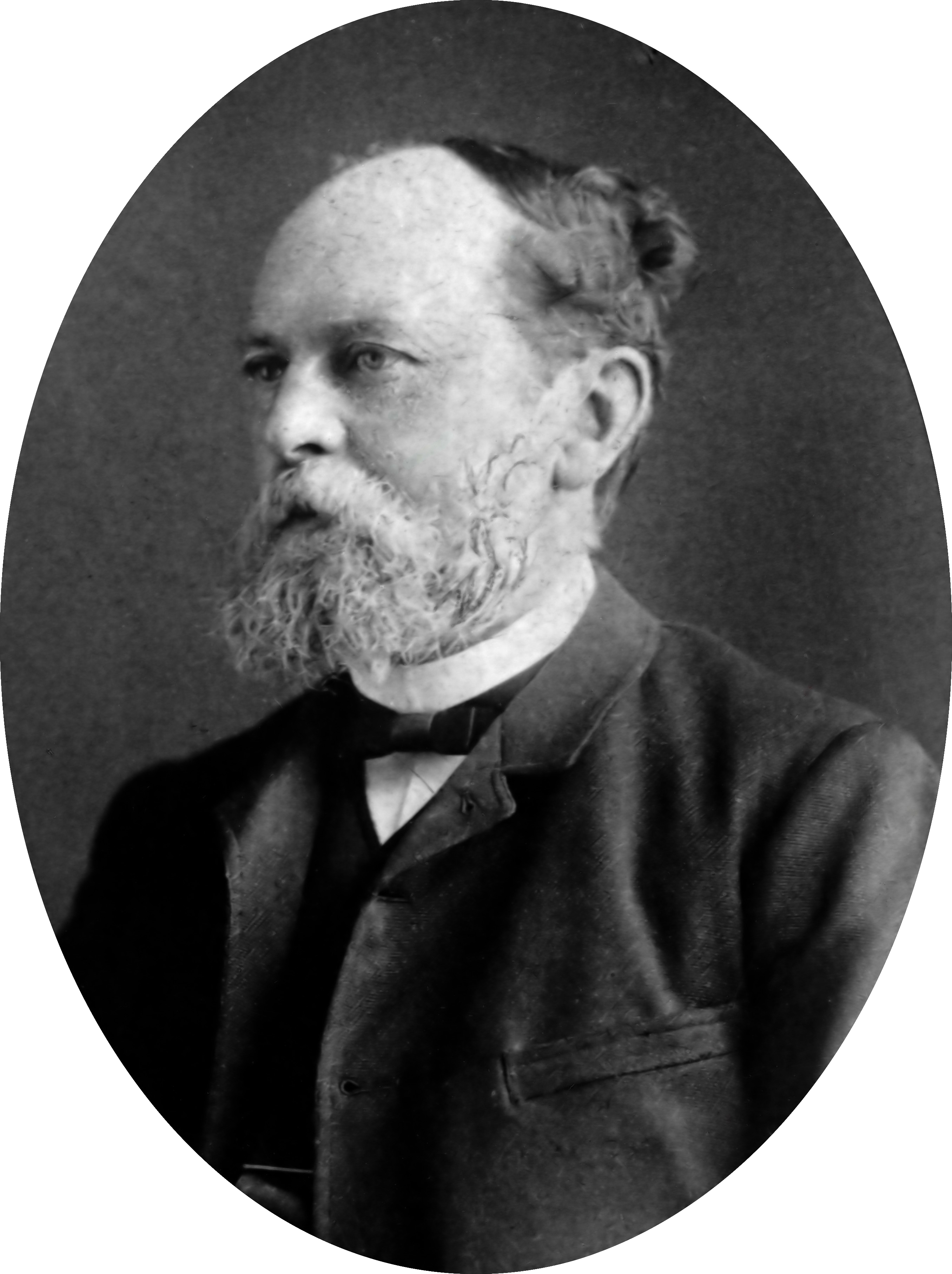
Samuel van Houten

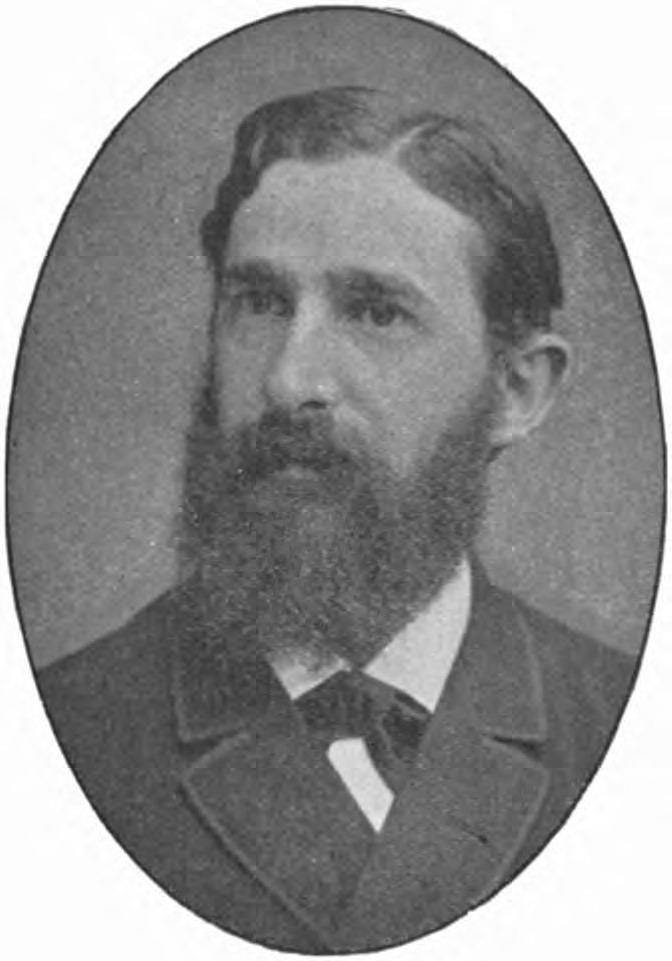
Hendrik Lodewijk Drucker

Groningen was a progressive district which elected liberals throughout its existence. Early representatives of the district include Berend Wichers and Steven Blaupot ten Cate, as well as the prominent statesman Johan Rudolph Thorbecke briefly in 1866. Groningen's longest-serving member was the independent liberal Samuel van Houten, who represented the district from 1869 until 1894, when he was unseated by the more progressive Hendrik Lodewijk Drucker, later parliamentary leader of the Free-thinking Democratic League. Van Houten was subsequently appointed interior minister in the Röell cabinet. In 1901, Drucker failed to send a letter of acceptance of his election in time, thus triggering a by-election in which he was re-elected unopposed. After Drucker's election to the Senate in 1913, the district elected Dirk Bos, but he had also been elected for the district of Winschoten, and opted to represent the latter, thus triggering another by-election in Groningen.

Election	First member	Party	Second member	Party
1848	Berend Wichers	Ind	One seat (1848–1888)	
1850	Berend Wichers	Ind	One seat (1848–1888)	
1851	Steven Blaupot ten Cate	Ind	One seat (1848–1888)	
1853	Steven Blaupot ten Cate	Ind	One seat (1848–1888)	
1856	Steven Blaupot ten Cate	Ind	One seat (1848–1888)	
1859	Berend Wichers	Ind	One seat (1848–1888)	
1860	Berend Wichers	Ind	One seat (1848–1888)	
1863	Johan Herman Geertsema Czn.	Ind	One seat (1848–1888)	
1864	Johan Herman Geertsema Czn.	Ind	One seat (1848–1888)	
1866	Johan Rudolph Thorbecke	Ind	One seat (1848–1888)	
1866	Johan Rudolph Thorbecke	Ind	One seat (1848–1888)	
1866	Willem Hendrik Dullert	Ind	One seat (1848–1888)	
1868	Willem Hendrik Dullert	Ind	One seat (1848–1888)	
1868	Johan Herman Geertsema Czn.	Ind	One seat (1848–1888)	
1869	Samuel van Houten	Ind	One seat (1848–1888)	
1871	Samuel van Houten	Ind	One seat (1848–1888)	
1875	Samuel van Houten	Ind	One seat (1848–1888)	
1879	Samuel van Houten	Ind	One seat (1848–1888)	
1883	Samuel van Houten	Ind	One seat (1848–1888)	
1884	Samuel van Houten	Ind	One seat (1848–1888)	
1886	Samuel van Houten	Ind	One seat (1848–1888)	
1887	Samuel van Houten	Ind	One seat (1848–1888)	
1888	Samuel van Houten	Lib	Jacob Dirk Veegens	Lib
1891	Samuel van Houten	Lib	Jacob Dirk Veegens	Lib
1894	Hendrik Lodewijk Drucker	Lib	Jacob Dirk Veegens	Lib
1897	Hendrik Lodewijk Drucker	Lib	One seat (1897–1918)	
1901	Hendrik Lodewijk Drucker	VD	One seat (1897–1918)	
1901	Hendrik Lodewijk Drucker	VD	One seat (1897–1918)	
1905	Hendrik Lodewijk Drucker	VD	One seat (1897–1918)	
1909	Hendrik Lodewijk Drucker	VD	One seat (1897–1918)	
1913	Dirk Bos	VD	One seat (1897–1918)	
1913	Joseph Limburg	VD	One seat (1897–1918)	
1917	Joseph Limburg	VD	One seat (1897–1918)	

== Election results ==
=== Elections in the 1840s ===
1848 general election: Groningen
Candidate	Party	Votes	%
Berend Wichers	Independent	700	83.73
W.L. de Sturler	Independent	34	4.07
Arnoldus Oudeman	Independent	22	2.63
L.T. Jorissen	Independent	21	2.51
O.Q.J.J. van Swinderen	Independent	14	1.67
Others		45	5.38
Total		836	100.00
Valid votes		836	99.76
Invalid/blank votes		2	0.24
Total votes		838	100.00
Registered voters/turnout		1,191	70.36
Independent gain			
Source: Electoral Council, Huygens Institute

=== Elections in the 1850s ===
1850 general election: Groningen
Candidate	Party	First round		Second round	
Candidate	Party	Votes	%	Votes	%
Steven Blaupot ten Cate	Independent	390	48.33	351	42.19
Berend Wichers	Independent	263	32.59	481	57.81
Ludolf Wichers	Independent	76	9.42		
Others		78	9.67		
Total		807	100.00	832	100.00
Valid votes		807	99.02	832	98.35
Invalid/blank votes		8	0.98	14	1.65
Total votes		815	100.00	846	100.00
Registered voters/turnout		1,417	57.52	1,417	59.70
Independent hold					
Source: Electoral Council, Huygens Institute

1851 Groningen by-election
Candidate	Party	Votes	%
Steven Blaupot ten Cate	Independent	356	64.49
J.D. van Herwerden	Independent	90	16.30
G. Diephuis	Independent	37	6.70
Others		69	12.50
Total		552	100.00
Valid votes		552	99.46
Invalid/blank votes		3	0.54
Total votes		555	100.00
Registered voters/turnout		1,417	39.17
Independent hold			
Source: Electoral Council, Huygens Institute

1853 general election: Groningen
Candidate	Party	Votes	%
Steven Blaupot ten Cate	Independent	557	64.24
G.W.H. baron van Imhoff	Independent	286	32.99
Others		24	2.77
Total		867	100.00
Valid votes		867	99.09
Invalid/blank votes		8	0.91
Total votes		875	100.00
Registered voters/turnout		1,443	60.64
Independent hold			
Source: Electoral Council, Huygens Institute

1856 periodic election: Groningen
Candidate	Party	Votes	%
Steven Blaupot ten Cate	Independent	443	90.78
Guillaume Groen van Prinsterer	Independent	22	4.51
Others		23	4.71
Total		488	100.00
Valid votes		488	99.39
Invalid/blank votes		3	0.61
Total votes		491	100.00
Registered voters/turnout		1,476	33.27
Independent hold			
Source: Electoral Council, Huygens Institute

1859 Groningen by-election
Candidate	Party	Votes	%
Berend Wichers	Independent	206	71.28
O.Q.J.J. van Swinderen	Independent	43	14.88
L.T. Jorissen	Independent	27	9.34
Others		13	4.50
Total		289	100.00
Valid votes		289	97.64
Invalid/blank votes		7	2.36
Total votes		296	100.00
Registered voters/turnout		1,484	19.95
Independent hold			
Source: Electoral Council, Huygens Institute

=== Elections in the 1860s ===
1860 periodic election: Groningen
Candidate	Party	Votes	%
Berend Wichers	Independent	253	93.01
Others		19	6.99
Total		272	100.00
Valid votes		272	93.79
Invalid/blank votes		18	6.21
Total votes		290	100.00
Registered voters/turnout		1,521	19.07
Independent hold			
Source: Electoral Council, Huygens Institute

1863 Groningen by-election
Candidate	Party	Votes	%
Johan Herman Geertsema Czn.	Independent	389	74.24
Willem Jozef Andreas Jonckbloet	Independent	73	13.93
J.J. Bleeker	Independent	32	6.11
Others		30	5.73
Total		524	100.00
Valid votes		524	99.24
Invalid/blank votes		4	0.76
Total votes		528	100.00
Registered voters/turnout		1,564	33.76
Independent hold			
Source: Electoral Council, Huygens Institute

1864 periodic election: Groningen
Candidate	Party	Votes	%
Johan Herman Geertsema Czn.	Independent	583	82.81
James John Teding van Berkhout	Independent	82	11.65
O.Q.J.J. van Swinderen	Independent	27	3.84
Others		12	1.70
Total		704	100.00
Valid votes		704	99.72
Invalid/blank votes		2	0.28
Total votes		706	100.00
Registered voters/turnout		1,493	47.29
Independent hold			
Source: Electoral Council, Huygens Institute

March 1866 Groningen by-election
Candidate	Party	Votes	%
Johan Rudolph Thorbecke	Independent	520	69.15
O.Q.J.J. van Swinderen	Independent	116	15.43
J.D. van Herwerden	Independent	48	6.38
D.R. Wijckerheld Bisdom	Independent	45	5.98
Others		23	3.06
Total		752	100.00
Valid votes		752	99.87
Invalid/blank votes		1	0.13
Total votes		753	100.00
Registered voters/turnout		1,463	51.47
Independent hold			
Source: Electoral Council, Huygens Institute

October 1866 general election: Groningen
Candidate	Party	Votes	%
Johan Rudolph Thorbecke	Independent	564	63.30
E. van Loon	Independent	151	16.95
Levinus Wilhelmus Christiaan Keuchenius	Independent	125	14.03
O.Q.J.J. van Swinderen	Independent	32	3.59
Others		19	2.13
Total		891	100.00
Valid votes		891	99.66
Invalid/blank votes		3	0.34
Total votes		894	100.00
Registered voters/turnout		1,463	61.11
Independent hold			
Source: Electoral Council, Huygens Institute

December 1866 Groningen by-election
Candidate	Party	Votes	%
Willem Hendrik Dullert	Independent	361	58.89
Coos Cremers	Independent	184	30.02
Jan Willem van Loon	Independent	43	7.01
Others		25	4.08
Total		613	100.00
Valid votes		613	99.84
Invalid/blank votes		1	0.16
Total votes		614	100.00
Registered voters/turnout		1,463	41.97
Independent hold			
Source: Electoral Council, Huygens Institute

1868 general election: Groningen
Candidate	Party	Votes	%
Willem Hendrik Dullert	Independent	543	65.11
J.A. Feith	Independent	173	20.74
Guillaume Groen van Prinsterer	Independent	110	13.19
Others		8	0.96
Total		834	100.00
Valid votes		834	99.88
Invalid/blank votes		1	0.12
Total votes		835	100.00
Registered voters/turnout		1,507	55.41
Independent hold			
Source: Electoral Council, Huygens Institute

1868 Groningen by-election
Candidate	Party	Votes	%
Johan Herman Geertsema Czn.	Independent	740	72.55
J.A. Feith	Independent	235	23.04
Guillaume Groen van Prinsterer	Independent	38	3.73
Others		7	0.69
Total		1,020	100.00
Valid votes		1,020	99.61
Invalid/blank votes		4	0.39
Total votes		1,024	100.00
Registered voters/turnout		1,507	67.95
Independent hold			
Source: Electoral Council, Huygens Institute

1869 Groningen by-election
Candidate	Party	Votes	%
Samuel van Houten	Independent	422	79.92
Jacob Dirks	Independent	60	11.36
P.A.S. van Limburg Brouwer	Independent	18	3.41
Theo van Lynden van Sandenburg	Independent	16	3.03
Others		12	2.27
Total		528	100.00
Valid votes		528	98.88
Invalid/blank votes		6	1.12
Total votes		534	100.00
Registered voters/turnout		1,507	35.43
Independent hold			
Source: Electoral Council, Huygens Institute

=== Elections in the 1870s ===
1871 periodic election: Groningen
Candidate	Party	Votes	%
Samuel van Houten	Independent	412	54.50
Levinus Wilhelmus Christiaan Keuchenius	Independent	199	26.32
Alexander de Savornin Lohman	Independent	120	15.87
Others		25	3.31
Total		756	100.00
Valid votes		756	99.60
Invalid/blank votes		3	0.40
Total votes		759	100.00
Registered voters/turnout		1,529	49.64
Independent hold			
Source: Electoral Council, Huygens Institute

1875 periodic election: Groningen
Candidate	Party	Votes	%
Samuel van Houten	Independent	615	71.10
Oncko Wicher Star Numan	AR	246	28.44
Others		4	0.46
Total		865	100.00
Valid votes		865	99.65
Invalid/blank votes		3	0.35
Total votes		868	100.00
Registered voters/turnout		1,632	53.19
Independent hold			
Source: Electoral Council, Huygens Institute

1879 periodic election: Groningen
Candidate	Party	Votes	%
Samuel van Houten	Independent	394	65.67
Coos Cremers	Independent	117	19.50
Levinus Wilhelmus Christiaan Keuchenius	AR	78	13.00
Others		11	1.83
Total		600	100.00
Valid votes		600	98.36
Invalid/blank votes		10	1.64
Total votes		610	100.00
Registered voters/turnout		1,486	41.05
Independent hold			
Source: Electoral Council, Huygens Institute

=== Elections in the 1880s ===
1883 periodic election: Groningen
Candidate	Party	Votes	%
Samuel van Houten	Independent	640	55.36
O.Q. van Swinderen	Independent	306	26.47
W.J. Quintus	Independent	209	18.08
Others		1	0.09
Total		1,156	100.00
Valid votes		1,156	99.74
Invalid/blank votes		3	0.26
Total votes		1,159	100.00
Registered voters/turnout		1,601	72.39
Independent hold			
Source: Electoral Council, Huygens Institute

1884 general election: Groningen
Candidate	Party	Votes	%
Samuel van Houten	Independent	527	52.39
Pieter Cort van der Linden	Independent	371	36.88
Alexander de Savornin Lohman	AR	104	10.34
Others		4	0.40
Total		1,006	100.00
Valid votes		1,006	99.70
Invalid/blank votes		3	0.30
Total votes		1,009	100.00
Registered voters/turnout		1,630	61.90
Independent hold			
Source: Electoral Council, Huygens Institute

1886 general election: Groningen
Candidate	Party	Votes	%
Samuel van Houten	Independent	706	68.08
Petrus Johannes van Swinderen	Independent	328	31.63
Others		3	0.29
Total		1,037	100.00
Valid votes		1,037	99.71
Invalid/blank votes		3	0.29
Total votes		1,040	100.00
Registered voters/turnout		1,726	60.25
Independent hold			
Source: Electoral Council, Huygens Institute

1887 general election: Groningen
Candidate	Party	Votes	%
Samuel van Houten	Independent	465	72.77
Petrus Johannes van Swinderen	Independent	109	17.06
Ferdinand Domela Nieuwenhuis	Independent	30	4.69
Others		35	5.48
Total		639	100.00
Valid votes		639	97.41
Invalid/blank votes		17	2.59
Total votes		656	100.00
Registered voters/turnout		1,733	37.85
Independent hold			
Source: Electoral Council, Huygens Institute

1888 general election: Groningen
Candidate	Party	First round		Second round	
Candidate	Party	Votes	%	Votes	%
Samuel van Houten	Lib	2,573	25.57		
Jacob Dirk Veegens	Lib	2,372	23.57	3,738	67.01
Anthony Brummelkamp	AR	1,643	16.33	1,840	32.99
Herman Schaepman	Ka	1,540	15.31		
J.A. Nieuwenhuis	Rad	935	9.29		
Ferdinand Domela Nieuwenhuis	Soc	726	7.22		
A.M. Prins	Prot	103	1.02		
Others		170	1.69		
Total		10,062	100.00	5,578	100.00
Valid votes		10,062	98.69	5,578	99.82
Invalid/blank votes		134	1.31	10	0.18
Total votes		10,196	100.00	5,588	100.00
Registered voters/turnout		6,360	160.31	6,360	87.86
Liberal gain					
Liberal gain					
Source: Electoral Council, Huygens Institute

=== Elections in the 1890s ===
1891 general election: Groningen
Candidate	Party	First round		Second round	
Candidate	Party	Votes	%	Votes	%
Jacob Dirk Veegens	Lib	2,387	30.94		
Samuel van Houten	Lib	1,785	23.14	2,629	66.61
Anthony Brummelkamp	AR	1,103	14.30	1,318	33.39
Herman Schaepman	Ka	1,059	13.73		
Adriaan Louis Poelman	Rad	904	11.72		
Ferdinand Domela Nieuwenhuis	V	320	4.15		
F. van der Goes	V	92	1.19		
Others		64	0.83		
Total		7,714	100.00	3,947	100.00
Valid votes		7,714	97.92	3,947	98.67
Invalid/blank votes		164	2.08	53	1.32
Total votes		7,878	100.00	4,000	100.00
Registered voters/turnout		6,021	130.84	6,021	66.43
Liberal hold					
Liberal hold					
Source: Electoral Council, Huygens Institute

1894 general election: Groningen
Candidate	Party	Votes	%
Jacob Dirk Veegens	Lib	2,123	31.94
Hendrik Lodewijk Drucker	Lib	1,841	27.70
Samuel van Houten	Lib	1,107	16.65
Anthony Brummelkamp	AR	582	8.76
J. Haspers	AR	508	7.64
Herman Schaepman	Ka	199	2.99
Johan George Gleichman	Independent	112	1.68
Others		175	2.63
Total		6,647	100.00
Valid votes		6,647	93.12
Invalid/blank votes		491	6.88
Total votes		7,138	100.00
Registered voters/turnout		6,026	118.45
Liberal hold			
Liberal hold			
Source: Electoral Council, Huygens Institute

1897 general election: Groningen
Candidate	Party	First round		Second round	
Candidate	Party	Votes	%	Votes	%
Hendrik Lodewijk Drucker	Lib	1,709	39.61	2,651	60.89
Samuel van Houten	VL	1,024	23.73	1,703	39.11
Anthony Brummelkamp	AR	1,005	23.29		
J. Domela Nieuwenhuis	CHK	362	8.39		
F. van der Goes	SDAP	215	4.98		
Total		4,315	100.00	4,354	100.00
Valid votes		4,315	99.45	4,354	98.44
Invalid/blank votes		24	0.55	69	1.56
Total votes		4,339	100.00	4,423	100.00
Registered voters/turnout		5,630	77.07	5,630	78.56
Liberal hold					
Source: Electoral Council, Huygens Institute

=== Elections in the 1900s ===
1901 general election: Groningen
Candidate	Party	First round		Second round	
Candidate	Party	Votes	%	Votes	%
Hendrik Lodewijk Drucker	VD	2,481	47.86	3,176	64.63
Samuel van Houten	VL	1,428	27.55	1,738	35.37
Willem Helsdingen	SDAP	704	13.58		
Anthony Brummelkamp	AR	571	11.01		
Total		5,184	100.00	4,914	100.00
Valid votes		5,184	98.91	4,914	99.39
Invalid/blank votes		57	1.09	30	0.61
Total votes		5,241	100.00	4,944	100.00
Registered voters/turnout		6,424	81.58	6,424	76.96
Free-thinking Democratic gain					
Source: Electoral Council, Huygens Institute

1901 Groningen by-election
Candidate	Party	Votes	%
Hendrik Lodewijk Drucker	VD		
Total			
Registered voters/turnout		6,424	–
Free-thinking Democratic hold			
Source: Electoral Council, Huygens Institute

1905 general election: Groningen
Candidate	Party	First round		Second round	
Candidate	Party	Votes	%	Votes	%
Hendrik Lodewijk Drucker	VD	2,573	39.35	4,405	67.19
Alexander de Savornin Lohman	CHP	1,897	29.01	2,151	32.81
H. Gorter	SDAP	1,230	18.81		
J. baron van Aulnis de Bourouill	VL	815	12.46		
F. van der Pers	CD	24	0.37		
Total		6,539	100.00	6,556	100.00
Valid votes		6,539	98.81	6,556	99.48
Invalid/blank votes		79	1.19	34	0.52
Total votes		6,618	100.00	6,590	100.00
Registered voters/turnout		7,849	84.32	7,849	83.96
Free-thinking Democratic hold					
Source: Electoral Council, Huygens Institute

1909 general election: Groningen
Candidate	Party	Votes	%
Hendrik Lodewijk Drucker	VD	3,501	51.20
Alexander de Savornin Lohman	CHU	2,170	31.73
Willem Vliegen	SDAP	1,167	17.07
Total		6,838	100.00
Valid votes		6,838	98.19
Invalid/blank votes		126	1.81
Total votes		6,964	100.00
Registered voters/turnout		9,096	76.56
Free-thinking Democratic hold			
Source: Electoral Council, Huygens Institute

=== Elections in the 1910s ===
1913 general election: Groningen
Candidate	Party	First round		Second round	
Candidate	Party	Votes	%	Votes	%
Dirk Bos	VD	3,760	43.02	4,171	55.62
Goswijn Sannes	SDAP	2,451	28.04	3,328	44.38
Jan Ankerman	CHU	2,406	27.53		
G. Sterringa	SDP	124	1.42		
Total		8,741	100.00	7,499	100.00
Valid votes		8,741	98.46	7,499	99.13
Invalid/blank votes		137	1.54	66	0.87
Total votes		8,878	100.00	7,565	100.00
Registered voters/turnout		10,452	84.94	10,452	72.38
Free-thinking Democratic hold					
Source: Electoral Council, Huygens Institute

1913 Groningen by-election
Candidate	Party	Votes	%
Joseph Limburg	VD	3,786	66.07
Eltjo Rugge	SDAP	1,863	32.51
G. Sterringa	SDP	81	1.41
Total		5,730	100.00
Valid votes		5,730	98.88
Invalid/blank votes		65	1.12
Total votes		5,795	100.00
Registered voters/turnout		10,452	55.44
Free-thinking Democratic hold			
Source: Electoral Council, Huygens Institute

1917 general election: Groningen
Candidate	Party	Votes	%
Joseph Limburg	VD	3,070	58.76
Samuel van Houten	AG	1,660	31.77
G. Sterringa	SDP	495	9.47
Total		5,225	100.00
Valid votes		5,225	97.85
Invalid/blank votes		115	2.15
Total votes		5,340	100.00
Registered voters/turnout		12,372	43.16
Free-thinking Democratic hold			
Source: Electoral Council, Huygens Institute
