= 1849 Dutch cabinet formation =

Formation of the first Thorbecke cabinet

After the resignation of the moderately liberal De Kempenaer-Donker Curtius cabinet on 18 September 1849, a cabinet formation took place in the Netherlands. On 1 November 1849, this resulted in the liberal first Thorbecke cabinet.

== Background ==
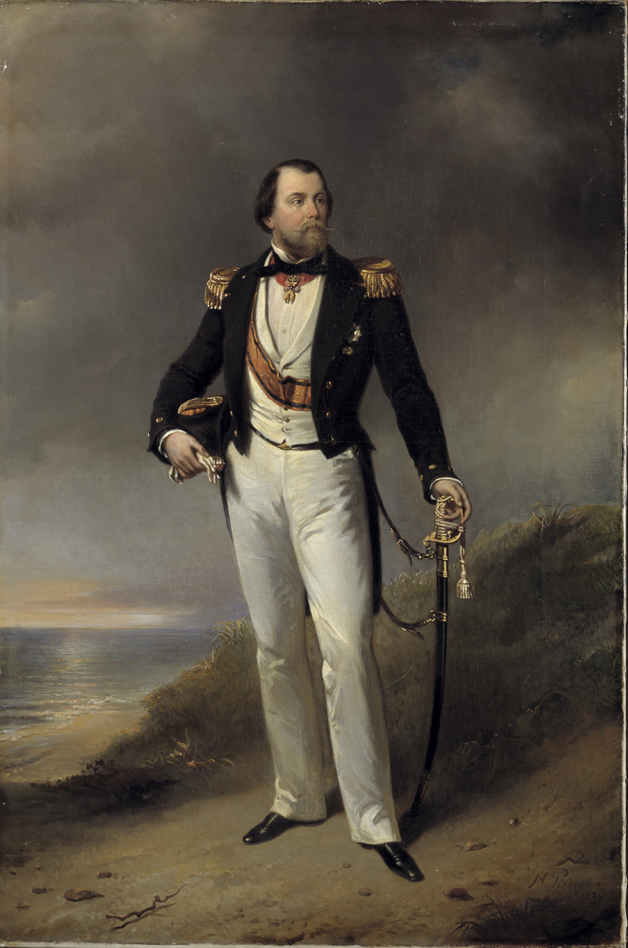
King William III of the Netherlands.

The De Kempenaer-Donker Curtius cabinet succeeded the conservative Schimmelpenninck cabinet in November 1848 after the Constitutional Reform of 1848 was proclaimed. The popular liberal and chairman of the Constitution Committee Johan Rudolph Thorbecke was missing from that cabinet. The 1848 general election took place that same month, in which the liberals won a majority, including a large proportion of Thorbeckians. The cabinet experienced a lot of opposition from the liberals in the House of Representatives, which meant that it was hardly able to pass any laws. It also suffered from impossible treatment by king William III, who took office in May 1849. An extremely negative draft response from the liberals to the speech from the throne was ultimately the final straw. On 18 September 1849, the ministers tendered their resignation.

== Formateurs Donker and Lightenvelt ==
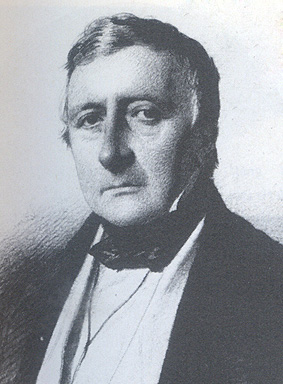
Formateur Dirk Donker Curtius.

The political establishment agreed that Thorbecke's accession was inevitable, but had difficulty with him because of his behavior. William III also considered Thorbecke – whom he had not yet met – unacceptable, partly because of a hostile amendment regarding the supervision of the management of the crown land. One day after the resignation request, the king therefore appointed Leonardus Antonius Lightenvelt and Dirk Donker Curtius as formateurs with the assignment to investigate the possibilities for a new cabinet 'that should be able to gain the King's confidence'. Lightenvelt was against Thorbecke joining a cabinet, while Donker Curtius was against a completely conservative cabinet.

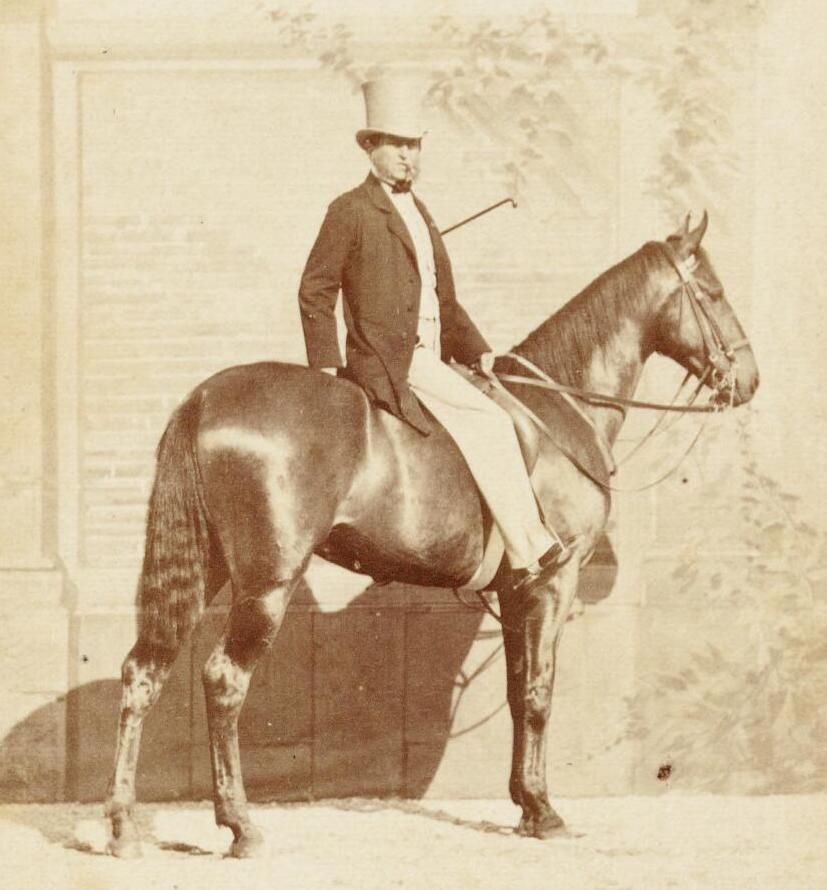
Formateur Leonardus Antonius Lightenvelt.

Donker Curtius immediately contacted Thorbecke. He proposed a mixed cabinet with liberals, including Thorbecke, who had the support of the House and conservative ministers who had the king's confidence. Thorbecke rejected this proposal because he wanted a homogeneous cabinet, if necessary a conservative cabinet. The conservatives that Donker Curtius sounded out, Willem Boreel van Hogelanden and Jean Chrétien Baud, also saw nothing in a 'patched up' cabinet. The formators tried to find a combination for a few more days, but had to conclude that there was no other option than calling in Thorbecke.

=== Subformateurs ===
Through Donker Curtius, Thorbecke and Jan Nedermeijer van Rosenthal received a request from the king on 3 October to make a proposal for a cabinet that was 'in accordance with the People's Representatives'. Donker Curtius and Lightenvelt remained the official formateur. The selection of moderate liberal Nedermeijer van Rosenthal was probably to rein in Thorbecke. Present at the meeting was the first candidate for the cabinet, Minister of Finance Pieter van Bosse, who was the only one from the previous cabinet who was allowed to stay on as far as the formateurs were concerned. Although it was a condition that as many ministers as possible had to be in line with the parliamentary majority, he visited Baud and Boreel for advice.

Thorbecke had difficulty finding ministers and, contrary to custom, did not take rank and status into account. As Minister of the Colonies, for example, he suggested the thirty-seven-year-old Indian civil servant Daniel Couperus Steyn Parvé, which, according to Baud, 'couldn't have been serious' because he was too low in rank. Thorbecke asked his former student and legation councilor at the Paris embassy Louis Gericke van Herwijnen, but he understood that he had too little stature for the position. For the Navy, Thorbecke suggested captain and teacher at the Royal Military Academy Willem Jan Knoop, but this was discouraged due to his rank, lack of experience and conviction for involvement in a duel with a fatal outcome.

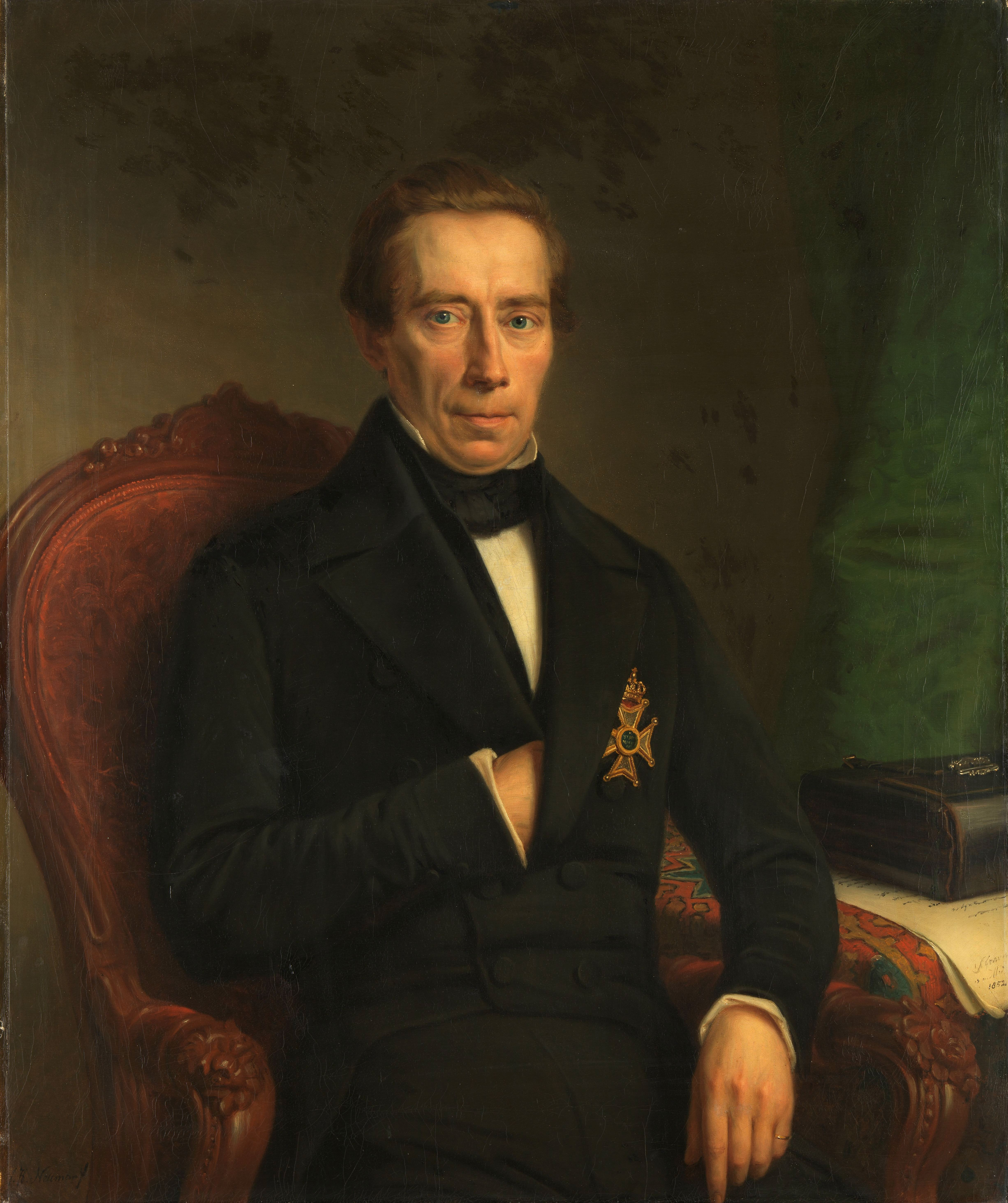
Formateur Johan Rudolf Thorbecke.

Thorbecke made the following proposal:

- Herman van Sonsbeeck (Colonial affairs)
- Isaäc Theodorus ter Bruggen Hugenholtz (Navy)
- Carel Marius Storm van 's Gravesande (War)
- Pieter van Bosse (Finance)
- Johan Rudolph Thorbecke (Interior)
- Jan Nedermeijer van Rosenthal (Justice & Foreign affairs)

On 15 October, Thorbecke submitted their proposal to the king via Donker Curtius. The king rejected all proposed ministers except Van Bosse. In particular, he considered the ministries of the Navy and War to be 'his' domain. In addition, he was against the proposal to abolish the two ministries of Religious Service (Dutch: Eredienst).

=== Request for government program ===
Willem III consulted with the formateurs, director of the King's Cabinet Anthon van Rappard and the two princes Frederick and Henry about the next steps. The king still refused to talk to Thorbecke. On 17 October, they decided to ask Thorbecke for a detailed government program, comparable to what would later become a coalition agreement. In this way the king hoped to get rid of Thorbecke. Thorbecke refused this request, because he thought it was clear enough what he stood for and that otherwise an invitation for a conversation was the usual route. Thorbecke also believed that the king should first give confidence to a cabinet and then judge it on actions, not promises. The king denied in a letter on 23 October that there was any lack of confidence, but considered their assignment completed.

=== Assignment for Van Goltstein ===
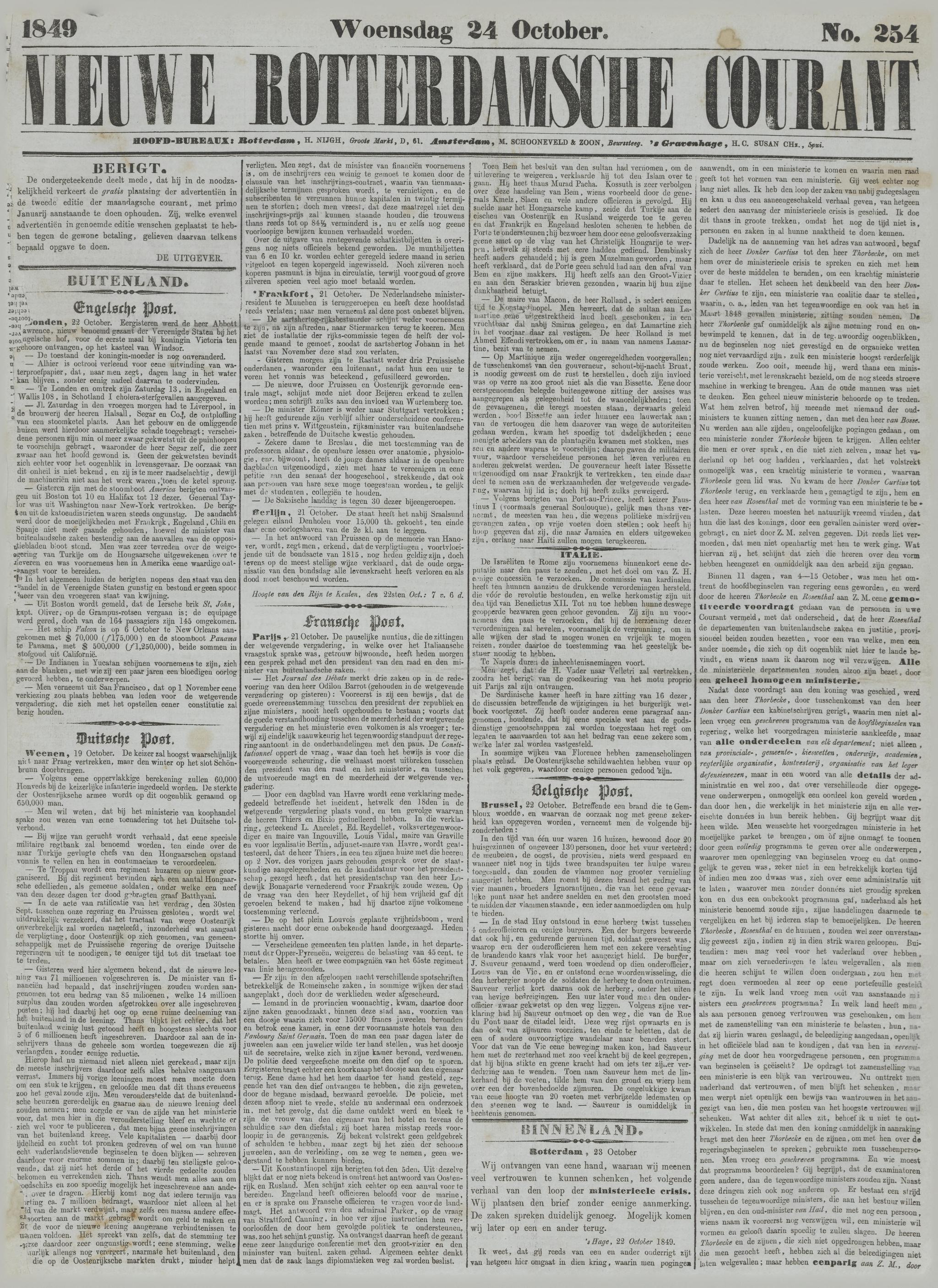
Front page of the Nieuwe Rotterdamsche Courant (NRC) of 24 October 1849, with the anonymous letter about the progress of the formation in the right column.

In the meantime, Lightenvelt and Donker Curtius had started looking for an alternative and ended up with the moderately liberal Speaker of the House of Representatives Jan Karel van Goltstein. On 22 October, Van Goltstein agreed to act as formateur. Two days later, however, an anonymous letter appeared in the Nieuwe Rotterdamsche Courant (NRC), describing the formation process, including the 'trap' that asked Thorbecke for a complete government program. The piece was probably composed by Thorbecke and written by Gijsbertus Martinus van der Linden.

Even in conservative circles it was recognized that the king and formateurs had not been fair towards Thorbecke. In panic, Donker Curtius made the same demand to Van Goltstein and submitted the entire policy program of the current ministry to him for signature. Van Goltstein requested all the documents of the formation and concluded that Thorbecke and Nedermeijer van Rosenthal had indeed been treated unfairly. He therefore withdrew as a formateur before he had started. Now that the king could no longer ignore Thorbecke, he relieved Donker Curtius and Lightenvelt of their assignment on 26 October.

== Formateurs Thorbecke and Nedermeijer van Rosenthal ==
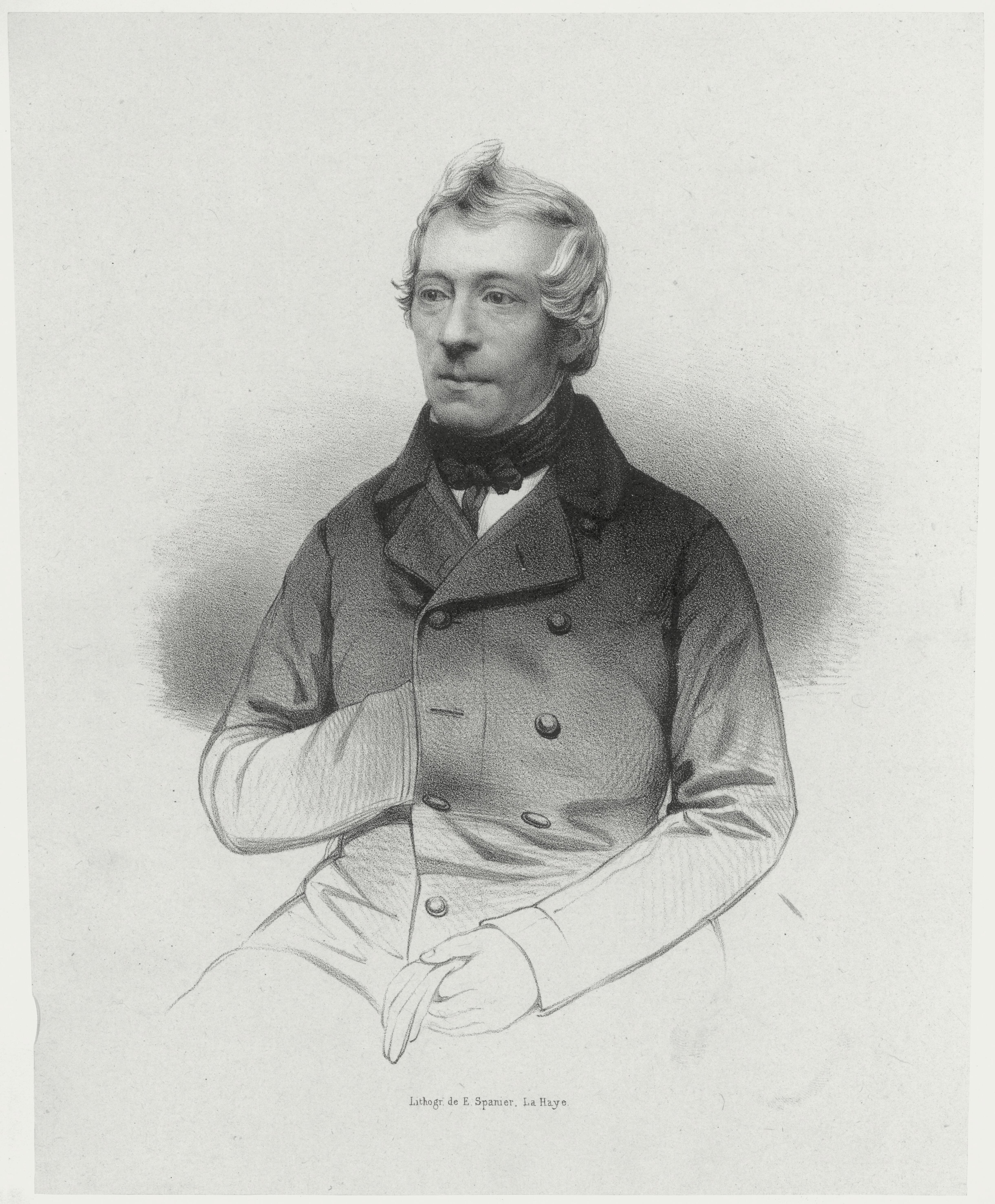
Formateur Jan Nedermeijer van Rosenthal.

On 27 October, William III received Thorbecke and Nedermeijer van Rosenthal. It became an unexpectedly constructive meeting. For War and Navy, the king proposed Johannes Theodorus van Spengler and Engelbertus Batavus van den Bosch. He wanted to retain the two ministries of Religious Service with the sitting ministers. For Colonies he proposed Secretary General Charles Ferdinand Pahud, who would act as a kind of deputy minister under the authority of the Minister of Finance. He also wanted Van Goltstein for Foreign Affairs.

A day later, the candidate-ministers met to see whether they could reach agreement on a number of important points. At the end of the meeting, Van den Bosch and Van Goltstein withdrew. They were replaced by Engelbertus Lucas and Van Sonsbeeck. The formateurs insisted on abolishing the ministries of Religious Service, instead transferring these tasks to the Catholic Van Sonsbeeck and the Protestant Nedermeijer van Rosenthal.

On 29 October, Thorbecke presented his new proposal to the king. The king was not immediately convinced and suggested a few other names. In particular he wanted to replace Van Sonsbeeck, whom he found an annoying guy. Thorbecke defended Van Sonsbeeck and emphasized that it was important to have a Catholic in the cabinet who had confidence in that religious community. On Van Rappard's advice, the king finally gave in. On 30 October, he appointed the ministers by royal decree and a day later they were sworn in.
