= Harderwijk (electoral district) =

Dutch electoral district (1848-1850)

Harderwijk was an electoral district of the House of Representatives in the Netherlands from 1848 to 1850.

== Profile ==
Harderwijk was created as a provisional single-member district in 1848 for the first direct election of the House of Representatives. It comprised the area in the province of Gelderland along the Zuiderzee, in what is known today as the Bible Belt. Named after the town of Harderwijk, it also included the municipalities of Barneveld, Doornspijk, Elburg, Ermelo, Hattem, Heerde, Hoevelaken, Nijkerk, Oldebroek, Putten and Scherpenzeel. As of 1848, the district had a population of 22,497. Harderwijk was predominantly Protestant, with 89.4% of the population aligned with the Dutch Reformed Church, while another 2.7% was Gereformeerd. A small minority of 6.7% was Catholic, while 1.6% was classified as "Other".

The district of Harderwijk proved short-lived, as it was abolished in 1850, its area split between the two-member districts of Arnhem and Zwolle.

== Members ==
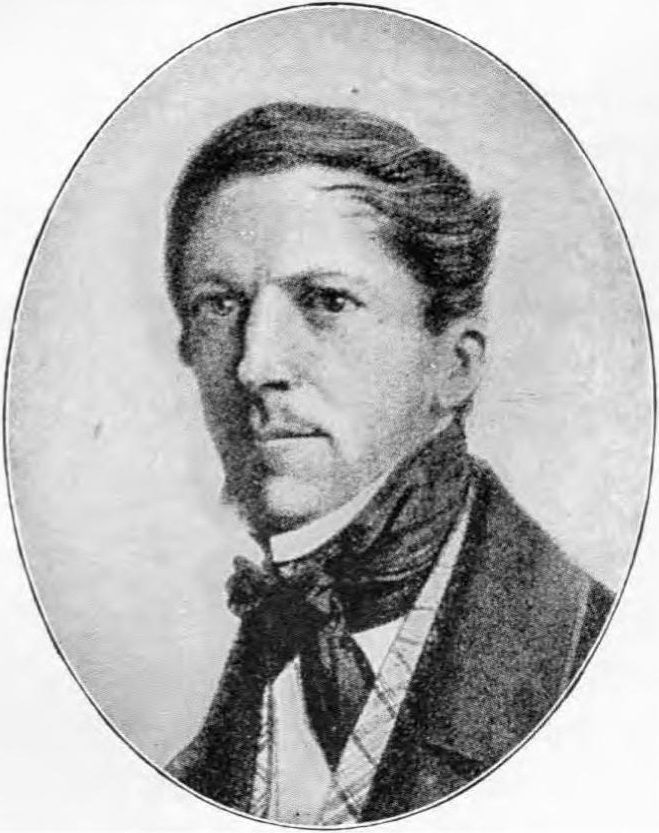
Guillaume Groen van Prinsterer

In the inaugural 1848 general election, the moderate liberal Johan Theodoor Hendrik Nedermeijer van Rosenthal was elected in Harderwijk, defeating Guillaume Groen van Prinsterer, leader of the Protestant antirevolutionary group in parliament. However, Nedermeijer van Rosenthal was also elected in the district of Arnhem, and opted to take his seat for the latter. The subsequent by-election in Harderwijk was won by Groen van Prinsterer, who would represent the district until its abolition. He would go on to represent the district of Zwolle from 1850 onward.

Election	Member	Ref.
1848	Johan Theodoor Hendrik Nedermeijer van Rosenthal	
1848	Guillaume Groen van Prinsterer	

== Election results ==
1848 general election: Harderwijk
Candidate	Party	Votes	%
Johan Theodoor Hendrik Nedermeijer van Rosenthal	Independent	324	54.73
Guillaume Groen van Prinsterer	Independent	237	40.03
Lodewijk Napoleon van Randwijck	Independent	12	2.03
Others		19	3.21
Total		592	100.00
Valid votes		592	98.50
Invalid/blank votes		9	1.50
Total votes		601	100.00
Registered voters/turnout		680	88.38
Independent gain			
Source: Electoral Council, Huygens Institute

1848–1849 Harderwijk by-election
Candidate	Party	First round		Second round	
Candidate	Party	Votes	%	Votes	%
Guillaume Groen van Prinsterer	Independent	262	48.07	332	60.58
Maximiliaan Jacob de Man	Independent	255	46.79	216	39.42
Engelbertus Batavus van den Bosch	Independent	12	2.20		
C.L. Vitringa	Independent	11	2.02		
Others		5	0.92		
Total		545	100.00	548	100.00
Valid votes		545	98.38	548	99.64
Invalid/blank votes		9	1.62	2	0.36
Total votes		554	100.00	550	100.00
Registered voters/turnout		680	81.47	680	80.88
Independent hold					
Source: Electoral Council, Huygens Institute
