= Constitutional Reform of 1848 =

Dutch reform towards parliamentary democracy

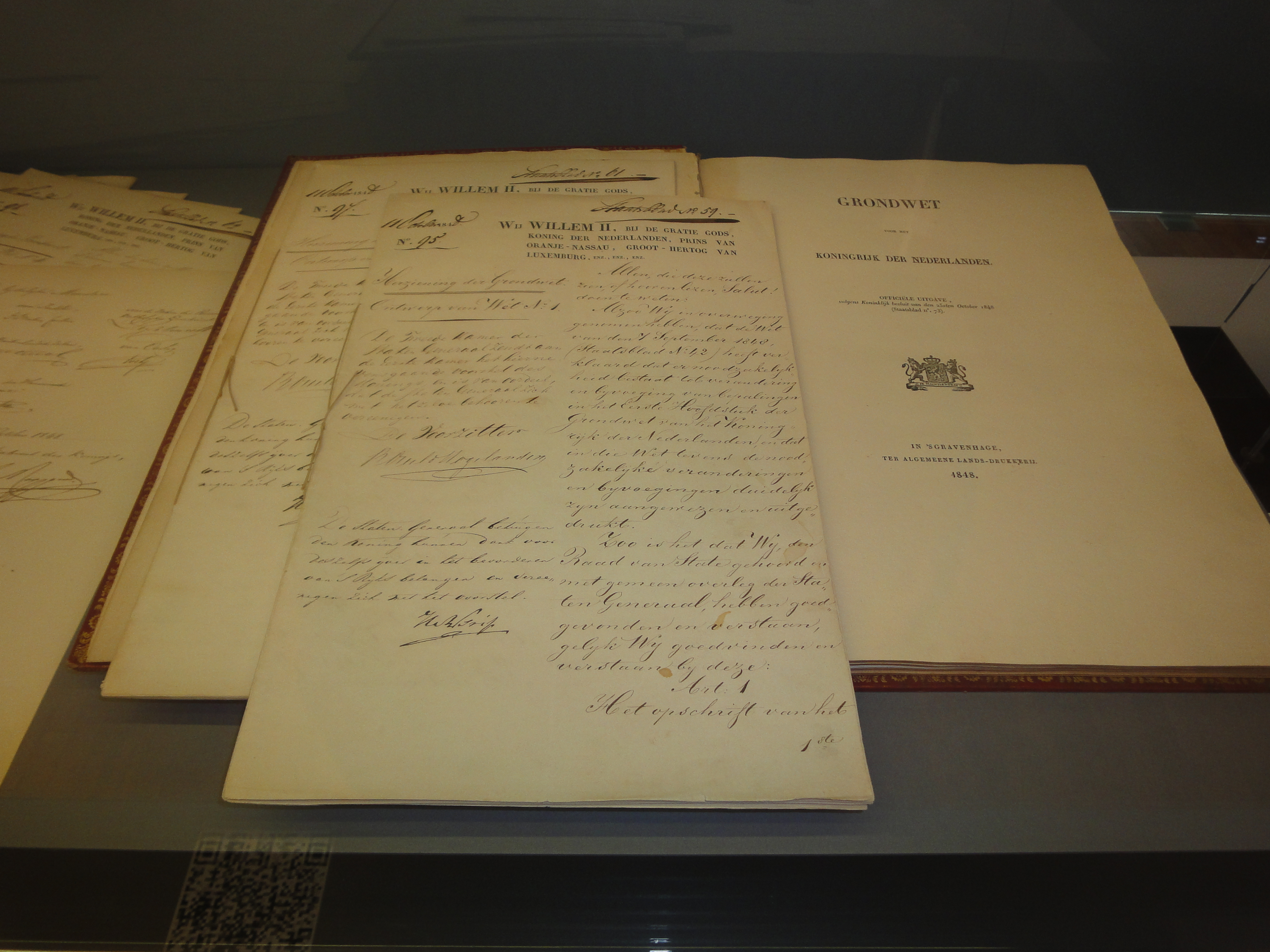
1848 constitutional reform documents

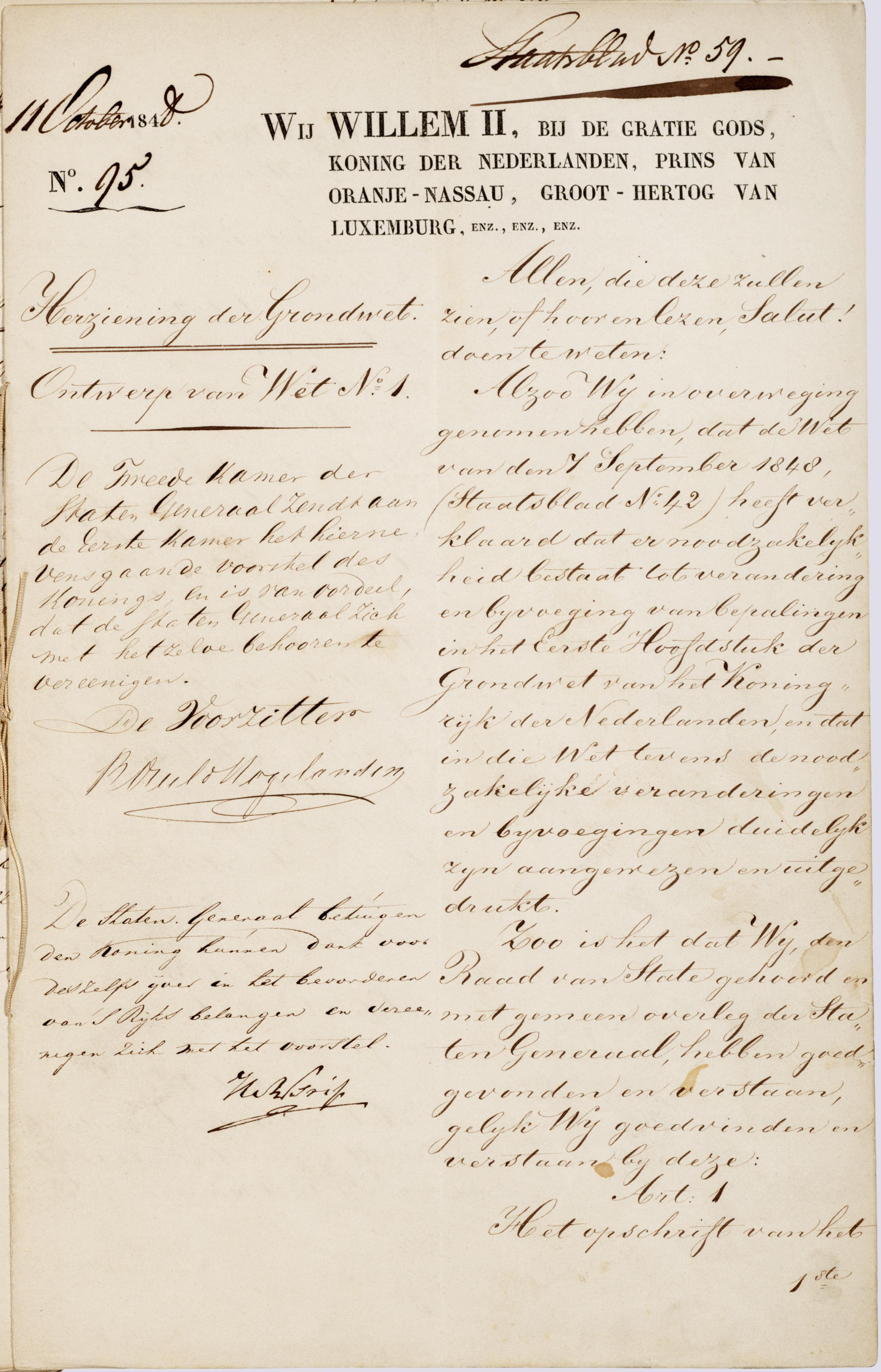
Frontpage of the 1848 Constitution

The Constitutional Reform of 1848 (Dutch: Grondwetsherziening van 1848) laid the basis for the present system of parliamentary democracy in the Netherlands. It is often described as the original version of the Dutch Constitution that is still in force today.

== Background ==
Since the establishment of the Kingdom of the Netherlands in 1815, the country had been governed as an executive monarchy, with the King holding executive authority and his ministers acting as servants. The House of Representatives was dominated by conservatives who supported the King's government. However, from around 1840 onward, the number of liberals striving for constitutional reform gradually increased. In 1844, nine liberal members of parliament known as the Negenmannen submitted a proposal for constitutional reform, which included the introduction of ministerial responsibility and direct elections to the House of Representatives. However, their proposal was defeated in May 1845, after which King William II felt no need to present any counterproposal. He announced reform in his speech from the throne in 1847, and the government tabled 27 proposals in early 1848, but these constituted only minor changes.

The situation changed considerably with the outbreak of the February Revolution in France and the March Revolution in the German Confederation. Around the same time, minor riots broke out in Amsterdam and The Hague, partly caused by the poor economic situation. These events spooked the King, who summoned Willem Boreel van Hogelanden, speaker of the House of Representatives, to enquire about parliament's views on a constitutional revision, and agreed to such a revision on 11 March. His ministers took offence to the King taking this step without informing them and resigned.

== Constitutional commission ==
On 17 March 1848, William II appointed a commission tasked with drafting a constitutional revision. The commission was chaired by Johan Rudolph Thorbecke, and also included Dirk Donker Curtius, Jacobus Mattheüs de Kempenaer, Lodewijk Caspar Luzac and Lambertus Dominicus Storm. All members except for Donker Curtius had been among the Negenmannen in 1844. The commission was also tasked with forming a new government, but not all of its members were willing to become a minister. On 23 March, after it had become clear the commission was unable to form a new government, the King appointed London envoy Gerrit Schimmelpenninck as formateur. His government took office on 25 March, and he became the chairman of the Council of the Ministers. Among the other ministers were Donker Curtius and Luzac, while De Kempenaar joined the government on 13 May.

The commission finalised its proposals on 9 April, and presented its report on 11 April. The proposals included the introduction of ministerial responsibility and the direct election of the House of Representatives and the Senate, as well as provincial and municipal councils. Four ministers, Schimmelpenninck, Charles Nepveu, Jules Constantijn Rijk and Leonardus Antonius Lightenvelt, objected to the proposals, favouring a more powerful monarch who appointed member of the Senate, as well as a strong prime minister. Lightenvelt later succumbed to the pressure of his fellow Catholics, while Rijk was pressured into support by the King, thus securing majority support in the cabinet. Schimmelpenninck and Nepveu consequently resigned, after which the chairmanship of the Council of Ministers rotated between Donker Curtius, Lightenvelt and De Kempenaer. The government did revise some minor elements of the commission's proposals; the incompatibility of a ministership and membership of parliament was scrapped, and so was automatic suffrage for university graduates.

== Parliamentary debate ==
Twelve constitutional amendments were submitted to the House of Representatives on 19 June 1848, and were defended by Donker Curtius. The House debated the amendments in August, during which one more change to the proposals took place; after objections from the House, the government scrapped the proposal for direct elections to the Senate in favour in indirect elections by provincial councils. After this change, all amendments passed the House. The Senate debated the amendments in October and, despite its conservative disposition, ultimately passed them by a minimal majority, thanks in part to efforts by the King. The constitutional revision came into effect on 3 November 1848.

== Contents ==
The most important changes included:

- The introduction of full ministerial responsibility, which meant the henceforth the Ministers were responsible for the government's policies instead of the King, who received sovereign immunity.
- The provincial councils, themselves elected by the voter, appointed by majorities for each province the members of the Senate from a select group of upper-class citizens.
- Parliament was henceforth elected directly by men who met the tax-based property qualifications, and obtained the right to interpellation, the right to hold investigative hearings (recht van enquête), and the right to amend government bills.
- Political and civil rights were expanded with the addition of the freedom of assembly and freedom of association, the privacy of correspondence, freedom of ecclesiastical organisation and the freedom of education.

== Aftermath ==
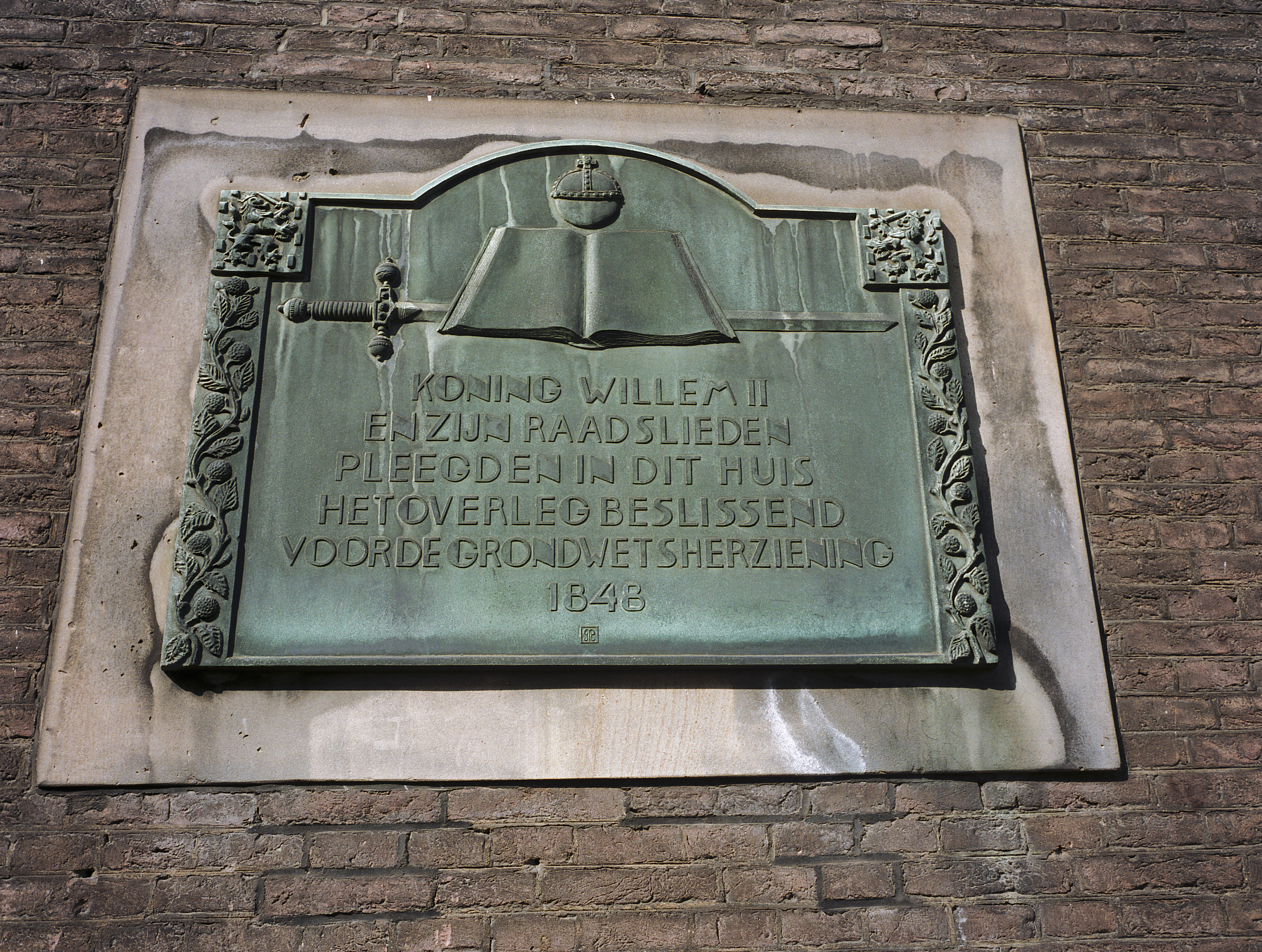
A plaque commemorating the 1848 Reform debates

The constitutional reform led to the inaugural 1848 Dutch general election, in which liberals won a majority. The cabinet, led by Donker Curtius and De Kempenaer, attempted to enact organic laws relating to elections and municipalities, but after a number of defeats and resignations and parliamentary opposition from Thorbecke, the cabinet resigned in September 1849, and was succeeded by Thorbecke's first cabinet. Thorbecke's cabinet proved more successful in legislation, enacting the Elections Act (1850), the Provinces Act (1850), the Nationality Act (1850) and the Municipalities Act (1851), among others.

The freedom of ecclesiastical organisation enabled the Catholic Church to reestablish the episcopal hierarchy in the Netherlands in 1853 (the previous hierarchy had been abolished during the Eighty Years' War). This challenged the perceived notion of the Netherlands being a Protestant nation, but Prime Minister Thorbecke maintained that, based on the freedom of religion and separation of church and state, the Catholic Church was allowed to reorganise itself on Dutch territory. Conservative Protestants initiated the April Movement in an attempt to prevent it, winning the sympathy of King William III. This led to a constitutional crisis and the resignation of the Thorbecke cabinet, because the king had violated the new Constitution that prohibited his interference in political affairs, and the ministers had to take responsibility in his stead.

The unwritten principle that the government is dependent on the confidence of parliament, characteristic of a parliamentary system, developed gradually in the decades after 1848, and was established amid the Luxembourg Crisis in the late 1860s.
