= Fadime Örgü =

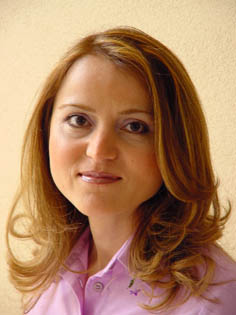

Personal details
- Born: March 15, 1968 (age 58) Karaman, Turkey
- Party: Liberal Party (Netherlands)

Fadime Örgü (b. March 15, 1968) is a Dutch-Turkish politician.

== Early life ==
Örgü was born on March 15, 1968 in Karaman, Turkey. Her family moved to the Netherlands when she was a child and she would interpret for the Turkish members of her neighborhood.

She has said she identifies as a world citizen, neither solely Turkish nor Dutch. She is Muslim.

== Career ==
Örgü was invited to join the Liberal party at the age of 17. She studied in both Germany and London for university, before deciding she wanted to become a politician. She studied political science at Leiden University for one year.

In 1989, Örgü began lecturing on democracy in Eastern bloc countries. After meeting with Tansu Çiller, Örgü was able to arrange for Turkey to join the International Non-Government Youth Organization.

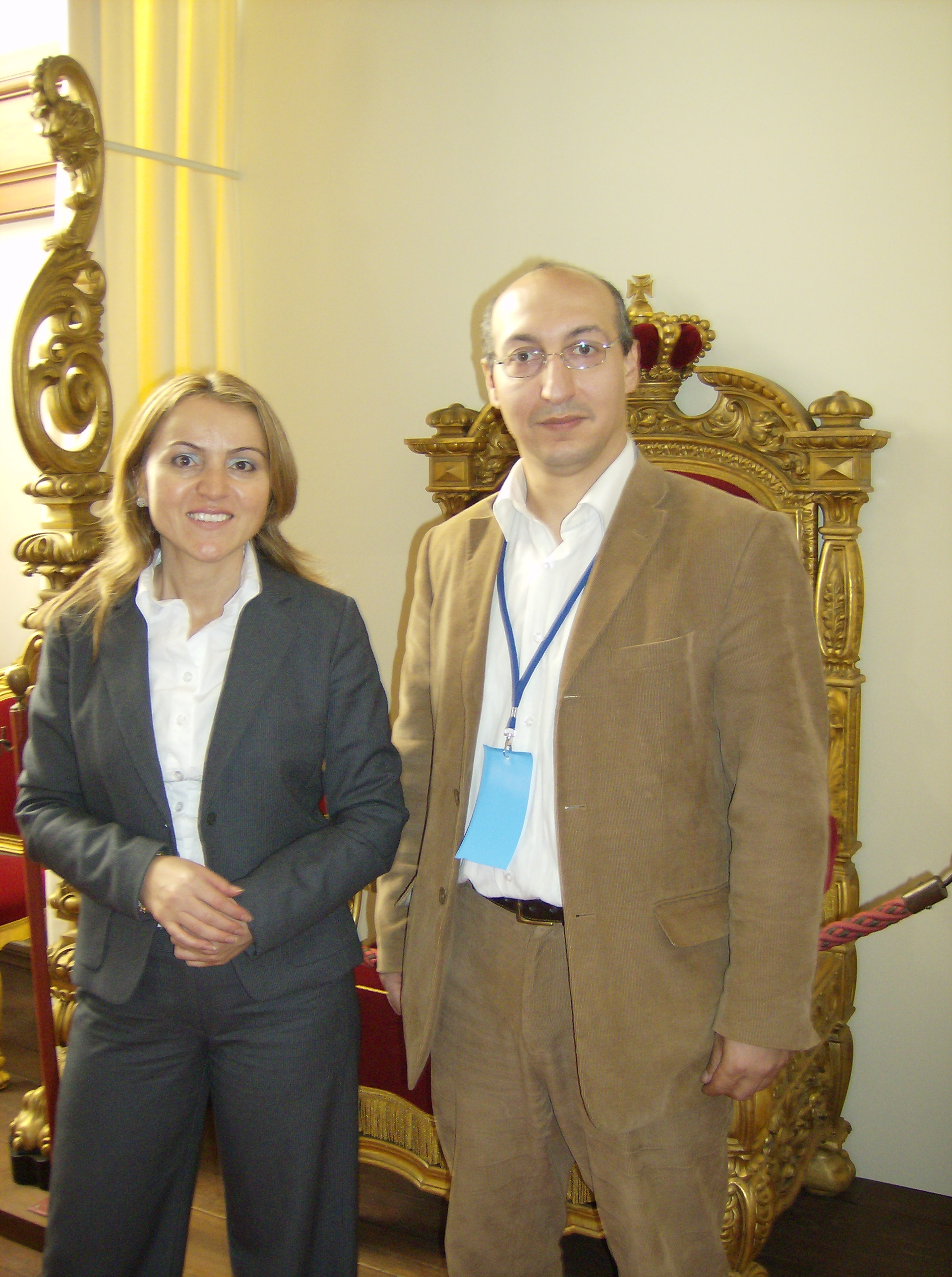
Fadime Örgü and film director Yusuf Fersat at the Dutch Parliament building.

She was a member of Netherlands' House of Representatives from 1998 to 2006, serving two terms. In 2025, she joined the Chapter for the Civil Orders.
