= Lizzy van Dorp =

Dutch politician and economist (1872–1945)

Elisabeth Carolina "Lizzy" van Dorp
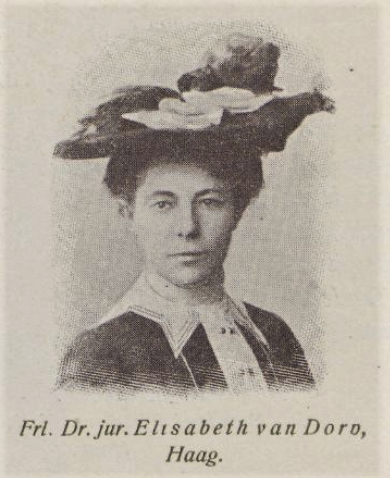
- Lizzy van Dorp (1904)
- Born: 5 September 1872; Arnhem, Netherlands
- Died: 6 September 1945 (aged 73); Banjoe Baroe, Java
- Education: Leiden University
- Occupations: Lawyer, economist, parliamentarian and feminist
- Known for: First Dutch woman to earn a law degree
- Parents: Gerard Carel Théophilus van Dorp (father); Adriana Elisabeth Verdam (mother)

Elisabeth Carolina van Dorp (5 September 1872 – 6 September 1945) was a Dutch lawyer, economist, parliamentarian and feminist.

== Life ==
Elisabeth Carolina van Dorp, often shortened to Lizzy, was the daughter of Adriana Elisabeth Verdam and Gerard Carel Théophilus van Dorp.

Van Dorp studied law at Leiden University. She became the first chairwoman of the Association of Female Students in Leiden, founded in 1900, and she became the first woman in the Netherlands to obtain a law degree in 1901. On 7 July 1903, she obtained her doctorate from Prof. J. Oppenheim for her thesis titled, Indemnification upon destruction or disabling of property by public authorities, which argued against a ban on the labor of married women.

She then practised private law, and gained international recognition in October 1903 as the first female attorney to appear before the Supreme Court. She also became active in various feminist movements, although she opposed the more radical forms of feminism—her focus was on instituting female suffrage.

In 1915, she was invited to join the editorial team of De Economist, a leading Dutch economics journal. In that capacity, she joined five male editors. In the 1920s she became swayed by the political ideas of another (orthodox) liberal, Samuel van Houten.

In 1922, Van Dorp became a parliamentarian for the Liberal Party. After that she supported the Liberal State Party. Altogether, she served as a member of the House of Representatives of the States General, from 25 July 1922 to 15 September 1925. According to records kept by the parliament, she was "Committed to women's rights. Published extensively on economic topics."

=== Traveller ===
After her mother's death in 1935, Van Dorp moved to England. There she wrote her book A Simple Theory of Capital, Wages, Profit and Loss, a New and Social Approach to the Problem of Economic Distribution (A simple theory of capital, of wages, of profit and loss, a new and social approach to the problem of economic distribution).

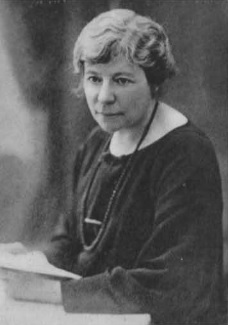
Lizzy Van Dorp

By the end of the 1930s, she had become an avid traveller, with stay-overs in Switzerland and Turkey. In 1940, she did not risk going back to the Netherlands, as another economist she had heavily criticized over the years, had become powerful in the National Socialist Movement and was close to German occupiers. Instead, she went to the Dutch East Indies, her mother's country of birth and where, nearly a century before, her father had founded a publishing firm: GCT van Dorp & Co.

=== Internment ===
In 1941 she was interned by the occupying Japanese forces. It remains unclear why she did not leave in the East Indies during World War II.

On her 72nd birthday in 1944, Van Dorp received a particular notebook. It served as a gift from other women in camp Tjihapit II in Bandung on West Java. It was a collection of recipes from the Indonesian kitchen to which they added their own recipes.

Van Dorp died "of exhaustion" on 6 September 1945 in camp Banjoe Biroe (Dutch East Indies), a Japanese internment camp, on Java. She died three weeks after the capitulation of Japanese forces and one day after her 73rd birthday. She had been interned there for more than three years.

== Selected works ==
- 1903: Indemnification in case of Destruction of Property by Public Authorities (dissertation Leiden University). Sl: sn
- 1907 (with W. Wijnaendts Francken-Dyserinck): A bat in the chicken coop. Haarlem: Tjeenk Willink. brochure, 66 pages.
- 1910: "Prae Advice." In: Prae Opinions on the Social Significance of the Labor of the Married Woman, and the Attitude to Be Adopted by the Government on That Question. The Hague
- 1914: Rights and Obligations of Servants and Employers. People's library. Amsterdam.
- 1916: "Something about newer money theories." In: Socio-Economic Compositions presented to GB Greven. Haarlem
- 1919: The Practical Significance of Theoretical Economy (public lesson). Haarlem
- 1922: The Bankruptcy of Contemporary Social Politics. Leiden: AW Sijthoff. See also: Polak, Henri (1923) - The Bankruptcy: Some Remarks Regarding “The Bankruptcy of Present Social Policy,” by Miss Mr. EC van Dorp. Amsterdam: NV “Development”
- 1929: "Prae Advice." In: Prae's Opinions on the Nature of Price Stabilization, its Desirability and Possibility. The Hague, p. 1-70
- 1931 (a): The consequences of Böhm-Bawerk's wage fund theory. In: Economic Drafting presented to Prof. CA Verrijn Stuart. Groningen. p. 27-54
- 1931 (b): Agio oder Lohnfonds? In: Archiv für Sozialwissenschaft und Politik, vol. 66, p. 284-319
- 1933 (a): The Way out of Unemployment According to a New Teaching of Wages and Interest. Haarlem
- 1933 (b): "For the doctrine of imputation." In: The Economist, p. 189-212
- 1933 (c): Löhne und Kapitalzins. In: Zeitschrift für Nationalökonomie, jrg. 4, p. 254-266
- 1933 (d): Economic Misunderstandings. In: Juri Sacrum 1882 - 1932, Lawyer Drafting. Amsterdam. p. 18 - 43
- 1933 (e): The Interest Riddle. Utrecht
- 1934: Dr. van Genechten's eccentric entrepreneur and the surplus value - Criticism of “Diminished Returns” by Dr. R. van Genechten, editor of “De Economist". Haarlem
- 1937 (a): A Simple Theory of Capital, Wages, Profit and Loss, a New and Social Approach to the Problem of Economic Distribution. London
- 1937 (b): Neither Communism nor Dictatorship, a Political Proposal. Haarlem

== See also ==
- First women lawyers around the world
