= Samuel van Houten =

Dutch politician

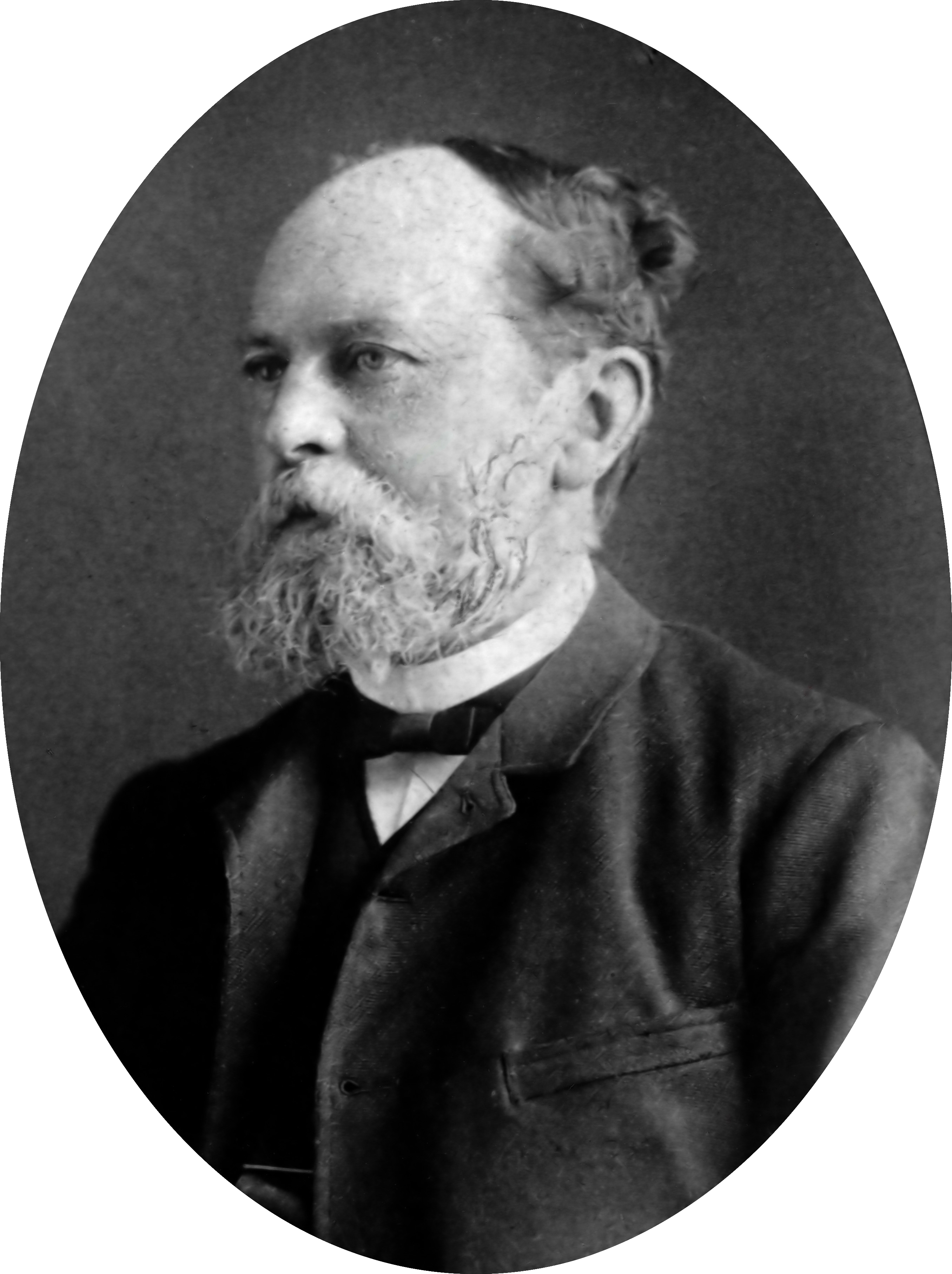
Samuel van Houten

Samuel van Houten (17 February 1837 – 14 October 1930) was a Dutch liberal politician, who served as Minister of the Interior from 1894 to 1897.

== Early life ==
Van Houten was born in Groningen into a wealthy Mennonite family. His parents were Derk van Houten, a timber merchant and local politician, and his wife Barbara Elizabeth Meihuizen. After attending a Latin school from 1849 to 1854, he studied Law at the University of Groningen, obtaining a degree in 1859. He then worked as a lawyer. He quickly became involved in the city's politics, getting elected to the municipal council in 1864 and becoming one of the city's aldermen in 1867. About this time Van Houten left the Mennonite Church and became an agnostic.

== Member of the House of Representatives ==
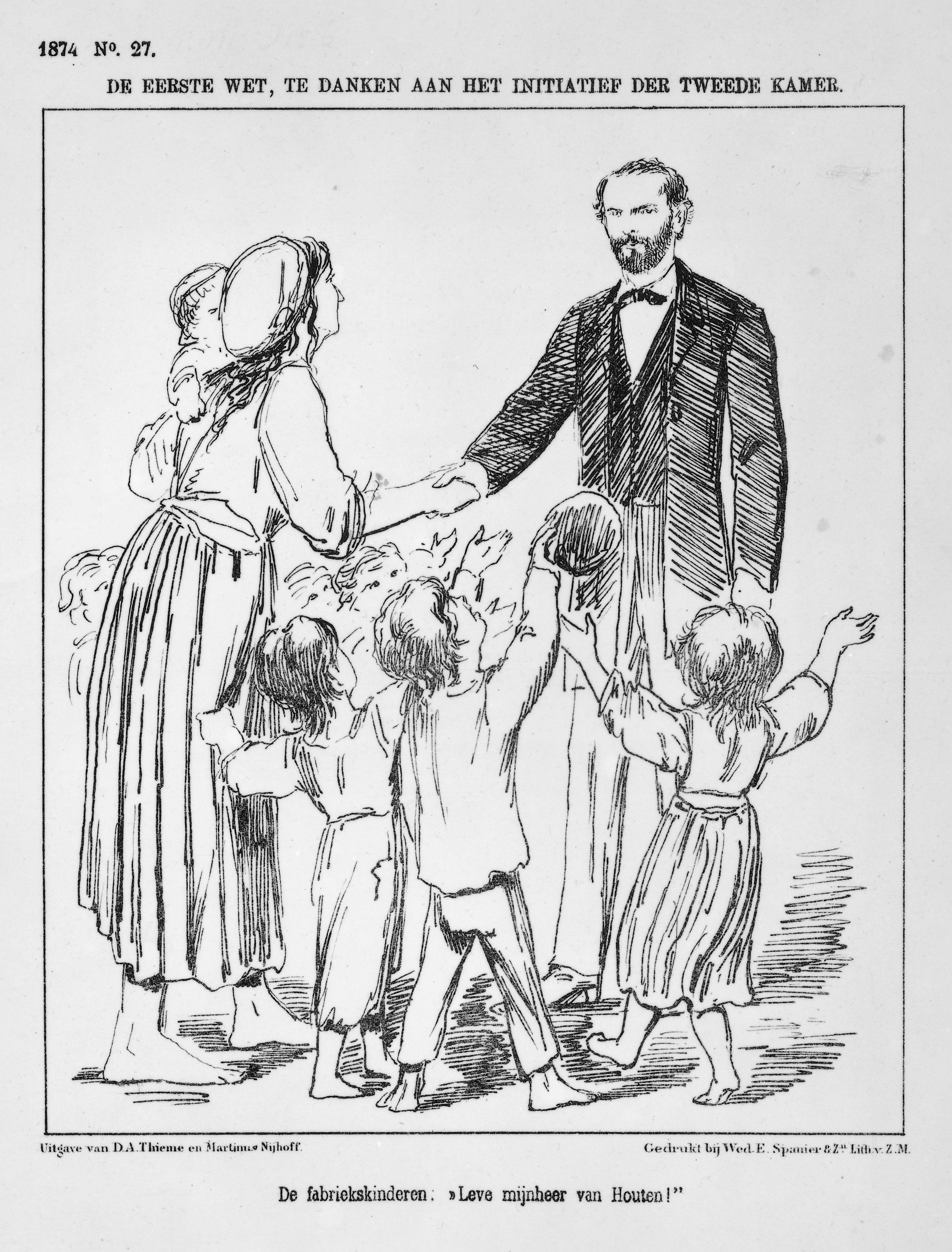
An illustration showing children cheering for Van Houten, on whose initiative child labour was abolished.

In 1869, van Houten was first elected to the House of Representatives for the electoral district Groningen. In the House of Representatives, Van Houten quickly established himself as an independent liberal, not reluctant to criticise the Thorbeckian liberal establishment. He denounced what he saw as a centralist tendency in the ideology of their leader, Johan Rudolph Thorbecke, jokingly referring to the latter's views as Bonapartism in 1872. Van Houten, in contrast, adhered to the belief that the historical development of different sectors of society should be respected, in this sense sharing semblance to Abraham Kuyper's theory of sphere sovereignty. This belief led him to take a different position on the issue of the school struggle than most of his fellow liberals. In 1887, he was one of only seven liberals to vote to allow for the equal funding of confessional schools.

Van Houten adhered to the principle of autonomy regarding the individual as well. On the issue of social policy, he believed government intervention was necessary to eliminate barriers to development of the individual so as to create equality of opportunity and thus to promote individual liberty. In this spirit, Van Houten introduced a bill that forbade child labour for children younger than 12 years. This bill, nicknamed the Kinderwetje van Van Houten, became the first social law of the Netherlands in 1874. Nonetheless, van Houten who started out as very progressive gradually became more conservative and opposed further social laws and any egalitarianism by the state. On individual issues, he continued to sponsor progressive causes, writing about feminism, prostitution and birth control. He was president of a Neo-Malthusian society in 1888.

While initially supportive of expansion of suffrage, Van Houten gradually became more conservative on the issue over time, fearing that an enfranchised proletariat would threaten the social balance. His opposition to Johannes Tak van Poortvliet's proposal to extend suffrage to all men except beggars and servants led him to lose re-election in the progressive district of Groningen in the general election of 1894. He was defeated by the Takkian liberal Hendrik Lodewijk Drucker.

== Ministership and later career ==
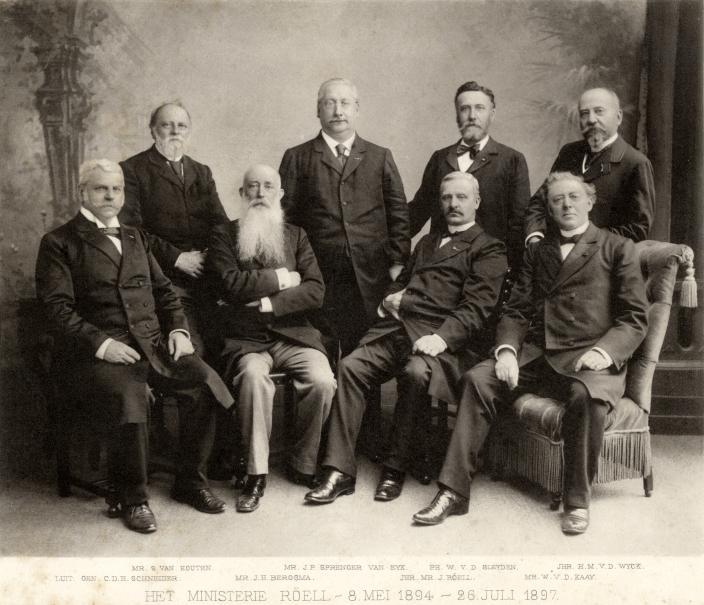
The Röell cabinet, with Van Houten standing on the left.

While Van Houten lost his seat in 1894, the anti-Takkians won the general election, after which Joan Röell was asked to form a government. In this conservative liberal government, which was installed on 9 May 1894, Van Houten succeeded Tak van Poortvliet as Minister of the Interior. As such, he was responsible for preparing a new Election Act. While more modest than Tak van Poortvliet's previous proposal, Van Houten's bill still doubled the electorate to roughly half the male adult population, a figure that would gradually rise to 68% in 1913. Aside from the suffrage issue, Van Houten introduced a bill that gave municipalities more financial support. He also allowed for the territorial expansion or large municipalities, such as Rotterdam in 1894 and Amsterdam and Leiden in 1896, necessitated by urbanisation.

Van Houten's ministership lasted until 27 July 1897, when he was succeeded by Hendrik Goeman Borgesius. Although he was not re-elected to the House of Representatives, he sat in the Senate for Friesland between 1904 and 1907. He strongly opposed the government of Abraham Kuyper, but also criticised liberal policy; his voting behaviour led some fellow liberals to call him an "honorary member of the right". Critical of the new electoral system and the expansion of government, the 85-year old Van Houten founded the short-lived Liberal Party in 1922 and became its lijsttrekker in the general election in that year. The party won one seat, but Van Houten chose not to accept it, allowing instead Lizzy van Dorp to take the seat.

== Death ==
Van Houten died of natural causes at the age of 93 on 14 October 1930.

== Personal life ==
Van Houten married Elisabeth van Konijnenburg on 29 June 1861, and the couple had five daughters and two sons. She died on 16 June 1872, after which Van Houten remarried Hermine Leendertz on 3 June 1873. With her, Van Houten had another five daughters and two sons. He had three well known grandsons. One was Hans van Houten, State Secretary for Foreign Affairs of the Netherlands between 1959 and 1963. Also, through his daughter Sina, her two sons, Sir Frederick Leith-Ross, who was chief economic advisor to the UK government from 1932 to 1945 and Harry Leith-Ross, who was a well-known artist who lived and worked in the US.

House of Representatives of the Netherlands
Preceded by Johan Herman Geertsema	Member for Groningen; 1869–1894; With: Jacob Dirk Veegens 1888–1894	Succeeded by Hendrik Lodewijk Drucker
Political offices
Preceded by Johannes Tak van Poortvliet	Minister of the Interior; 1894–1897	Succeeded by Hendrik Goeman Borgesius
