= Hendrik Lodewijk Drucker =

Dutch politician

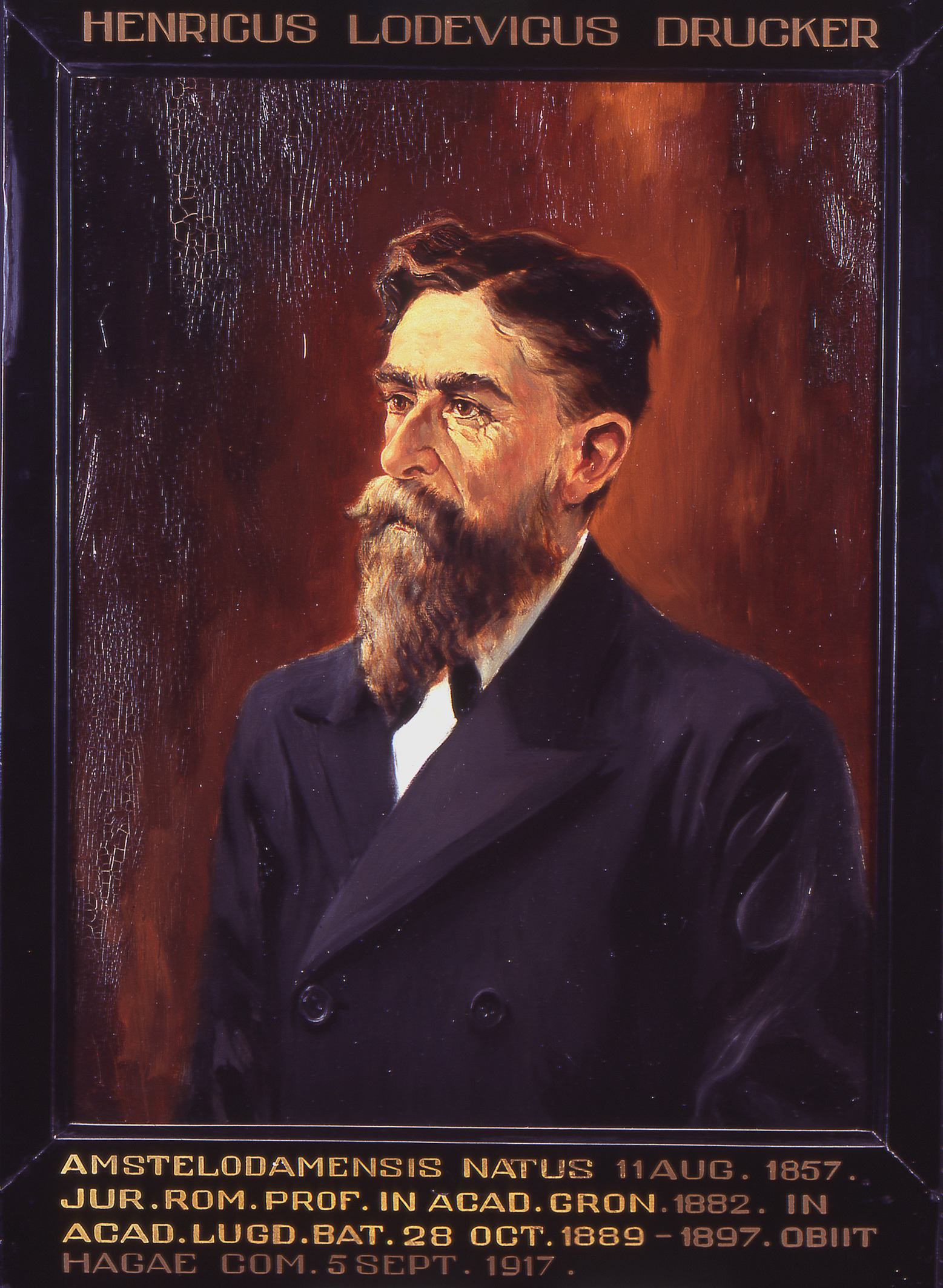
H.L. Drucker (1897)

Hendrik Lodewijk Drucker (Amsterdam, 11 August 1857 – The Hague, 5 September 1917) was a Dutch politician of the Free-thinking Democratic League. He was the half-brother of feminist Wilhelmina Drucker.

== Early life and career ==
Hendrik Lodewijk Temme was born in Amsterdam on 11 August 1857 to Louis Drucker, a financier, and Therese Temme, both originally from Germany. His father had previously had a relationship with Constantine Christine Lensing, from which two daughters were born, including Wilhelmine Lensing. He adopted his father's surname in 1865, and in 1869, his parents married and the family moved to Voorschoten.

Drucker attended the hogere burgerschool in Leiden and studied law at Leiden University from 1875 until 1879, receiving a doctorate with a dissertation entitled Bezitsverkrijging en bezitsverlies door derden. In 1880, he started working as a lawyer in Amsterdam. He was a professor of Roman law at the University of Groningen between 1882 until 1889, and at Leiden University between 1889 until 1897. He served as municipal councillor in both cities, in Groningen from 1886 until 1889, and in Leiden from 1891 until 1903.

In his academic career, Drucker, occasionally veered into political themes. His inaugural lecture at the University of Groningen advocated for greater state intervention in the relationship between capital and labour, stating that "if the State does not wish to see the weak suffer, it must occasionally intervene between the two with reasoned measures". This view was also reflected in his contributions to progressive-liberal journals such as the Sociaal Weekblad and Vragen des Tijds, which he co-edited, and in the legal journal Rechtsgeleerd Magazijn, which advocated a more social approach to law.

== National political career ==
Drucker's career in national politics started with the 1894 Dutch general election. This election was dominated by interior minister Johannes Tak van Poortvliet's proposal to greatly expand suffrage, with candidates of different parties declaring themselves "pro-Takkian" or "anti-Takkian". As a pro-Takkian Liberal, Drucker contested the election in the districts of Leiden and Groningen. In Leiden, he was defeated by the anti-Takkian Liberal Hendrik Johannes Bool, but in Groningen he unseated the anti-Takkian Liberal Samuel van Houten, who had held the seat since 1869. Drucker took office as member of the House of Representatives on 16 May 1894, and subsequently joined the Progressive-Liberal group. In 1901, he was one of the founders of the Free-thinking Democratic League, and was the party's inaugural parliamentary leader.

In the House, Drucker soon gained respect as a result of his knowledge, oratory skill, amiability, modesty and steadfast character. His interest lay less in politics than in legislative work, particularly regarding social legislation. He contributed to the 1901 Housing Act and the 1907 Employment Contracts Act, among others. In 1903, Drucker opposed interior minister Abraham Kuyper's bill to criminalise strikes by railway staff and civil servants, arguing that where working conditions were unsatisfactory, the government should not deny workers the right to use their last resort of defence. Nevertheless, he rejected strikes as a political method. In the same year, the Free-thinking Democratic group in the House tabled a constitutional amendment aiming to introduce universal male suffrage, limited female suffrage and direct elections to the Senate.

The political work in the House of Representative did not interest Drucker for long, and he came into conflict with fellow Free-thinking Democrat Dirk Bos, who more extroverted and practical in nature. Drucker was offered the ministership of justice in 1897 and in 1905, but he declined. In 1913, he retired from the House of Representatives as was elected to the Senate for North Holland, serving from 16 September 1913 until his death on 5 September 1917.

== Private life ==
Drucker married Wilhelmina Catharina Sabina de Koning on 14 July 1881. The couple had two sons and one daughter.

House of Representatives of the Netherlands
Preceded by Samuel van Houten	Member for Groningen; 1894–1913; With: Jacob Dirk Veegens 1894–1897	Succeeded by Joseph Limburg
Party political offices
New political party	Parliamentary leader of the Free-thinking Democratic League; 1901–1913	Succeeded by Dirk Bos
