= Eltjo Rugge =

Dutch politician (1872–1950)

- Eltjo Rugge in 1933

Member of the House of Representatives
- In office 17 September 1918 – 24 June 1922

Member of the Senate
- In office 18 September 1923 – 8 June 1937

Personal details
- Born: 10 September 1872 Stootshorn, Netherlands
- Died: 7 February 1950 (aged 77) Groningen, Netherlands
- Party: SDAP (1894–1946)
- Spouse: Anna Mulder (m. 1896)
- Children: 9

Eltjo Rugge (10 September 1872 – 7 February 1950) was a Dutch politician. A member of the municipal council of Groningen for 45 years for the Social Democratic Workers' Party (SDAP), Rugge was an important figure in the socialist movement in that city and the province of Groningen during the early 20th century. He was also a member of the Dutch House of Representatives from 1918 to 1922 and the Senate from 1923 to 1937.

== Early life ==
Eltjo Rugge was born on 10 September 1872 in the township of Stootshorn in the province of Groningen to Klaas Rugge, a shopkeeper, and Maria de Lange. After completing primary school, Rugge became a tailor's apprentice, but was forced to quit due to illness. He eventually moved to the city of Groningen, where he first came into contact with the socialist movement, being initially influenced by followers of Ferdinand Domela Nieuwenhuis. Rugge joined the Social Democratic Workers' Party (SDAP) in 1894. He co-founded local socialist electoral association de Arbeiderskiesvereeniging, became head editor of the regional SDAP newspaper in 1899 and a writer for the national SDAP newspaper Het Volk in 1901. He also worked as an insurance agent after 1910.

== Political career ==
Rugge was first elected to the municipal council of Groningen in 1901, becoming its youngest member up to that point. During the 1903 railroad strike, Rugge led a local action committee and was an advocate of widespread labor agitation. In 1907, Rugge was elected to the Provincial Council of Groningen, in which he would serve until 1935. As a politician, Rugge was known as a rigid thinker who was often involved with fellow SDAP members and the party membership. He strongly opposed the leftist tendency around the newspaper De Tribune during a 1909 internal conflict within the SDAP, but was unable to press for stronger measures against its leading figures, which split off to form the Social Democratic Party that year. During World War I, Rugge advocated against what he saw as the SDAP's overly conciliatory policies, and during the Red Week in November 1918 he publicly spoke in favor of the taking over of power by the working class, which was met with much opposition and led to his removal as head editor of the local SDAP newspaper following the revolution's failure.

Rugge entered national politics after being elected to the House of Representatives in the 1918 Dutch general election. As an MP, Rugge focused on agricultural and labour affairs, as well as matters related to the province of Groningen. For the 1922 Dutch general election, Rugge was replaced on the SDAP's electoral list by Agnes de Vries-Bruins, and was unable to secure another spot because of personal opposition to Rugge among SDAP membership, and his earlier calls for a revolution. Rugge had fallen into poverty after giving up his paid party positions in 1918, and ran an ultimately unsuccessful legal advice bureau in this period.

In 1924, Rugge became alderman in the municipality of Groningen, responsible for housing and public works. Rugge was responsible for large-scale urban renewal and slum clearance during his time as alderman, and was responsible for the construction of much of the working-class housing built in Groningen during the interwar period. He also led efforts to expand access to sewers and to build more public facilities such as swimming pools and playgrounds. In 1926, Rugge became a member of the Senate, where he was the SDAP's spokesperson for labor affairs and also focused on agriculture, internal affairs and public health, serving until 1937. During World War II, Rugge opposed membership of the German-aligned Nederlandsche Unie among former SDAP members. He remained an alderman until 1943 when he was forced to resign by the German occupiers.

== Later life ==
After the end of World War II, Rugge served in the emergency municipal council of Groningen for a year until 1946. Following the SDAP's merger into the Labour Party (PvdA) in 1946, Rugge did not join the PvdA due to his belief in the necessity of a socialist party focused on the working class. He was made an honorary citizen of the city of Groningen following his departure from the Groningen municipal council.

Eltjo Rugge died on 7 February 1950.

== Personal life ==
Rugge married Anna Mulder on 7 August 1896, with whom he had five sons and four daughters. Rugge was raised in the Dutch Reformed Church, but became irreligious later in life.
