= Coos Cremers =

Dutch politician

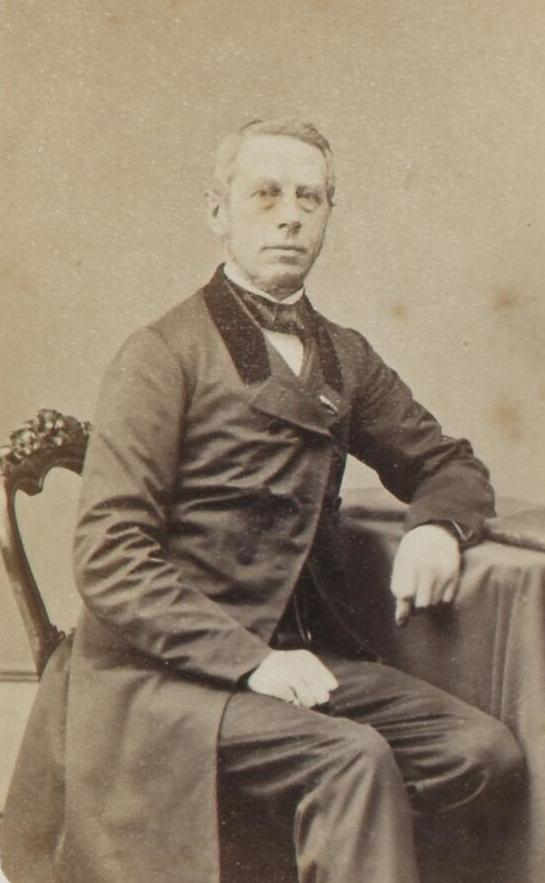
J.J. Cremers

Jacobus Johannes "Coos" Cremers (15 December 1806, Groningen - 5 March 1882, Groningen) was a Dutch politician.
