= Dirk Donker Curtius =

Dutch politician (1792–1864)

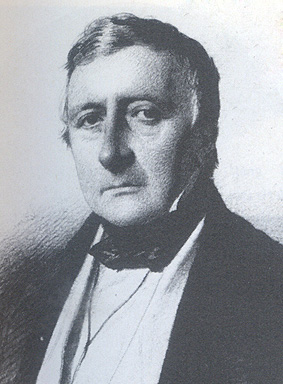
Dirk Donker Curtius

Dirk Donker Curtius (19 October 1792 – 17 July 1864) was a Dutch politician who served as Minister of Justice between 1848 and 1849, and again from 1853 to 1856.

== Early life ==
Dirk Donker Curtius was born on 19 October 1792 in 's-Hertogenbosch, the fourth son of Boudewijn Donker Curtius. He studied at Leiden University, receiving a doctorate on 14 December 1811, and subsequently worked as a lawyer in The Hague. In this period, in which the Netherlands had been annexed into the French Empire, he frequently publicly expressed his displeasure with French rule. He was detained at the Gevangenpoort and brought to Metz to be enlisted in the Guards of Honour, but avoided enlistment, and escaped the city after the Battle of Leipzig dressed as a servant.

After the restoration of Dutch independence in 1813, Donker Curtius returned to his work as a lawyer. He criticised the government for its unwillingness to make concessions to the Belgians, and unsuccessfully implored King William I to address their grievances in order to avoid Belgian secession. He also publicly argued for the limitation of the legal jurisdiction of water boards, public exploitation of the railways and freedom of the press. Despite his liberal disposition, Donker Curtius opposed Johan Rudolph Thorbecke's 1840 draft amendment to the Constitution, which would have implemented parliamentary supremacy at the expense of the monarch's prerogatives.

== Political career ==
Nevertheless, Donker Curtius argued for an amendment of the Constitution in 1845, and after the French Revolution of 1848, he was appointed to a committee, chaired by Thorbecke, tasked with preparing such an amendment. He was appointed minister of justice in March 1848, and in this position he defended the constitutional amendments in parliament. He resigned in June 1849 after the House of Representatives had rejected his bill on the right of association and assembly. He subsequently made an attempt at forming a new cabinet alongside Leonardus Antonius Lightenvelt as formateurs in the 1849 cabinet formation, but they could not prevent the ultimate formation of the first cabinet led by Thorbecke.

After the fall of Thorbecke's cabinet in 1853, Donker Curtius returned to the ministership of justice in Floris Adriaan van Hall's cabinet. Although Donker Curtius and Van Hall had been rivals in the past, their shared antipathy to Thorbecke brought them together. In his second tenure as justice minister, Donker Curtius achieved some legislative successes. In 1854, he introduced a bill amending penalties for criminal offences. Among other things, this bill abolished punishments such as branding and public humiliation and reduced the number of criminal offences punishable by death. He also introduced bills on ministerial responsibility (1855), the right to association and assembly (1856) and the conduct aboard merchant shipping vessels (1856).

Upon the cabinet's resignation in 1856, Donker Curtius retired from political life, and was granted the honorific title Minister of State by King William III.

== Private life ==
Donker Curtius married jonkvrouw Petronella Anthonia van Kessel on 16 May 1803 in Dordrecht. He died on 17 July 1864 in Spa, Belgium.
