= Liberal Party (Netherlands) =

Dutch political party

The Liberal Party (in Dutch: Liberale Partij, LP) was a Dutch conservative liberal political party. The LP played only a marginal role in Dutch politics.

== Party history ==
The Liberal Party was founded in 1922 by 85-year-old former minister Samuel van Houten in reaction to the foundation of the Liberal State Party which united all liberal parties. Van Houten disagreed with the political course of this new party especially where it came to economic policy and electoral law. Van Houten had started out as an extremely progressive liberal, who as an MP in the 1870s had initiated the first forms of social legislation and as a minister in the 1880s had reformed the electoral law. In the 1910s he had become more conservative, opposing encroaching social legislation and the new electoral system.

In the 1922 elections, the party won one seat. Van Houten was the party's top candidate; he had already announced that he would not take a seat in parliament, if the party would win too little seats. The party's one seat was taken by Lizzy van Dorp a classical liberal and feminist, who had been member of the Liberal State Party.

After the elections of 1925, the Liberal Party merged with the State Party for People's Prosperity (Staatspartij voor de Volkswelvaart) into the Fatherland League (Vaderlandsch Verbond) in 1925; (Note: The Liberal Party left the Fatherland League when this was resurrected as a reactionary party in May 1926.) however, van Dorp did not join the new party, since it gave up its free trade stance. She returned to the Liberal State Party.

== Ideology and issues ==
The party platform was based on free market liberalism and opposition to the new electoral system in the Pacification of 1917.

The party wanted to limit government influence, levels of taxation and government spending, and prevent the introduction of a system of social welfare.

The party advocated the return to the pre-Pacification electoral system, with limited voting rights and a two-round system in single seat constituencies. Members of parliament should be elected as independents without a party discipline.

== Leadership and support ==
This table shows the LP's results in elections to the House of Representatives and Senate elections, as well as the party's political leadership: the fractievoorzitter, is the chair of the parliamentary party and the lijsttrekker is the party's top candidate in the general election, these posts are normally taken by the party's leader.

Year	HoR	S	Lijsttrekker	Fractievoorzitter
1922	1	0	Samuel van Houten	Lizzy van Dorp
1923	1	0	no elections	Lizzy van Dorp
1924	1	0	no elections	Lizzy van Dorp

== Electorate ==
The Liberal Party drew most of its support from liberal cities the Hague and Amsterdam, and from Groningen the home base of Van Houten.
