= 1848 Dutch general election =

General elections were held in the Netherlands on 30 November and 4 December 1848. Held immediately after the Constitutional Reform of 1848, they were the first direct elections to the House of Representatives, and were the first to elect a States General to which government ministers would be responsible. Voting was restricted to men over the age of 23, and who paid a certain level of taxation. This limited the franchise to 55,728 people, roughly 11% of the male population over 23, or 2.5% of the total population of the country. Candidates were elected in districts in a two-round system; if no candidate received over 50% of the vote in the first round, the top two candidates would face a run-off. The districts had one MP for every 45,000 inhabitants.

As there were no official political parties until 1879, all candidates were nominally independents.

== Results ==
Party	Votes	%	Seats
Independents			68
Total			68
Total votes	44,805	–	
Registered voters/turnout	55,728	80.40	
Source: Nohlen & Stöver

=== By district ===
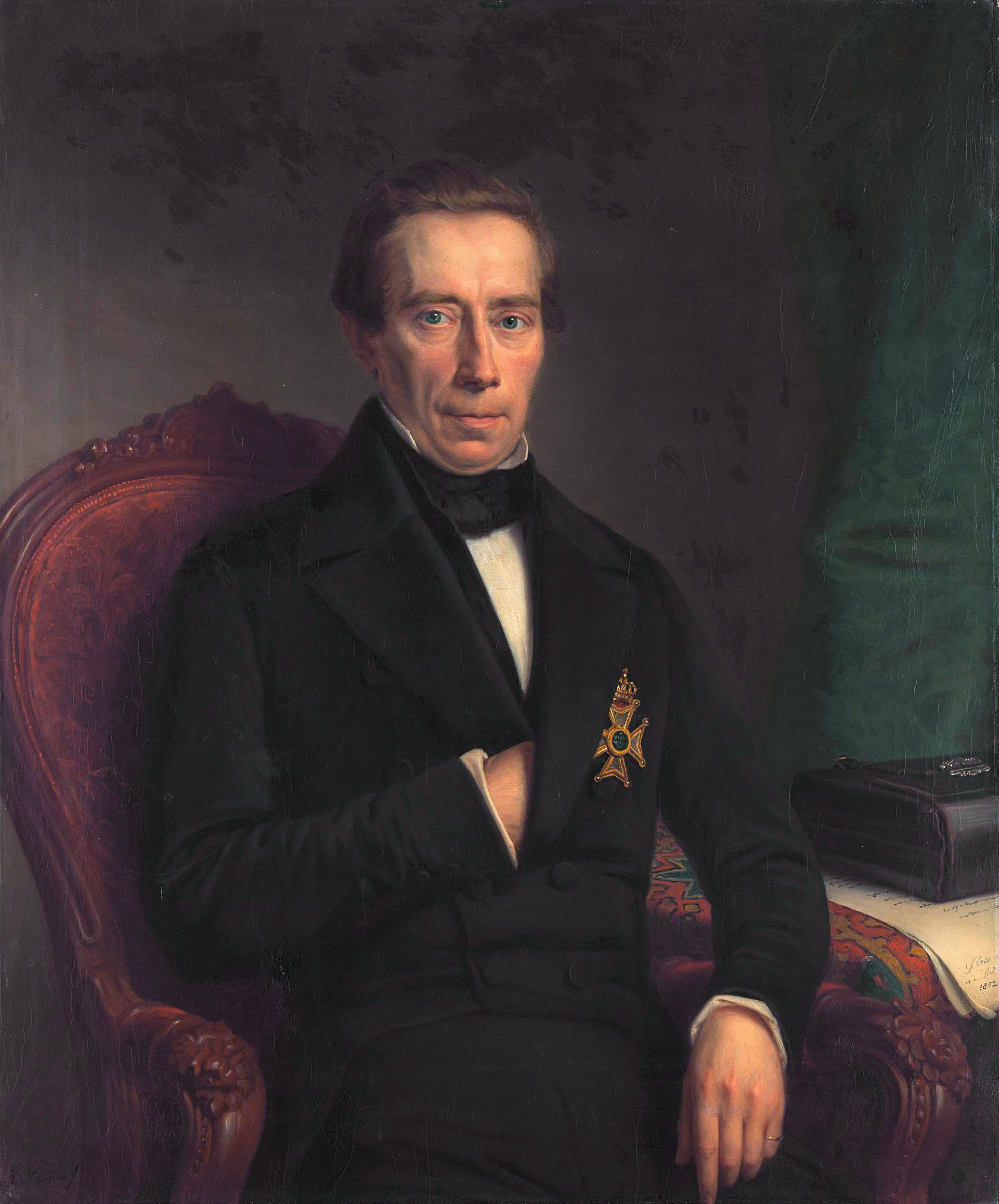
Johan Rudolph Thorbecke, whose constitutional reform triggered the election, was elected in Leiden, but gave up his seat in 1849 to lead his first cabinet.

District	Member elected	Province	Group	Ref.
Alkmaar	Samuel Antony de Moraaz	North Holland	Thorbeckian liberal	
Almelo	Dirk Donker Curtius	Overijssel	Pragmatic liberal	
Amersfoort	Simon van Walchren	Utrecht	Pragmatic liberal	
Amsterdam I	Michel Henry Godefroi	North Holland	Pragmatic liberal	
Amsterdam II	Cornelis Backer	North Holland	Pragmatic liberal	
Amsterdam III	Floris Adriaan van Hall	North Holland	Pragmatic liberal	
Amsterdam IV	Johannes Sebastiaan van Naamen	North Holland	Pragmatic liberal	
Amsterdam V	Jan Heemskerk Bzn.	North Holland	Thorbeckian liberal	
Appingedam	Rembertus Westerhoff	Groningen	Thorbeckian liberal	
Arnhem	Johan Nedermeyer van Rosenthal	Gelderland	Pragmatic liberal	
Assen	Louis van Heiden Reinestein	Drenthe	Conservative	
Bergen op Zoom	Karel Adrianus Meeussen	North Brabant	Thorbeckian liberal	
Breda	Lambertus Dominicus Storm	North Brabant	Thorbeckian liberal	
Brielle	Sebastiaan Hendrik Anemaet	South Holland	Thorbeckian liberal	
Delft	Willem Wintgens	South Holland	Pragmatic liberal	
Den Bosch	Johannes Luyben	North Brabant	Conservative liberal	
Den Haag I	Willem Boreel van Hogelanden	South Holland	Pragmatic liberal	
Den Haag II	Pieter Carel Schooneveld	South Holland	Pragmatic liberal	
Deventer	Carel Storm van 's Gravesande	Overijssel	Pragmatic liberal	
Doetinchem	Joannes van Nispen van Sevenaer	Gelderland	Pragmatic liberal	
Dokkum	Isaäc ter Bruggen Hugenholtz	Friesland	Thorbeckian liberal	
Dordrecht	Johannes Servaas Lotsy	South Holland	Pragmatic liberal	
Edam	Willem Jan Cornelis van Hasselt	North Holland	Pragmatic liberal	
Eindhoven	Johannes Franciscus van der Heijde	North Brabant	Pragmatic liberal	
Elst	Adriaan Walraven Engelen	Utrecht	Pragmatic liberal	
Enschede	Maximiliaan Jacob de Man	Overijssel	Pragmatic liberal	
Franeker	Jacob Dirks	Friesland	Conservative	
Goes	Philip Johannes Bachiene	Zeeland	Thorbeckian liberal	
Gorinchem	Abraham Boxman	South Holland	Pragmatic liberal	
Gouda	Gijsbertus Martinus van der Linden	South Holland	Thorbeckian liberal	
Grave	Johannes Hengst	North Brabant	Pragmatic liberal	
Groningen	Berend Wichers	Groningen	Thorbeckian liberal	
Haarlem	Willem Hendrik van Voorst	North Holland	Pragmatic liberal	
Harderwijk	Guillaume Groen van Prinsterer	Gelderland	Anti-revolutionary	
Heerenveen	Nicolaas van Heloma	Friesland	Pragmatic liberal	
Heerlen	Louis de Villers de Pité	Limburg	Pragmatic liberal	
Helmond	Johannes Baptista Bots	North Brabant	Thorbeckian liberal	
Heusden	Cornelis Schiffer	North Brabant	Conservative	
Hoogeveen	Lodewijk Napoleon van Randwijck	Drenthe	Ultraconservative	
Hoorn	Eko Theodorus Scheltinga Winterberg	North Holland	Conservative	
Kampen	Albertus Jacobus Duymaer van Twist	Overijssel	Pragmatic liberal	
Leeuwarden	Binse Albarda	Friesland	Pragmatic liberal	
Leiden	Johan Rudolph Thorbecke	South Holland	Thorbeckian liberal	
Leiderdorp	Gerardus Wouter Verweij Mejan	South Holland	Pragmatic liberal	
Maastricht	Eduardus Josephus Hubertus Borret	Limburg	Conservative (Catholic)	
Middelburg	Jan Jacob Slicher van Domburg	Zeeland	Pragmatic liberal	
Nijmegen	Gustaaf Dommer van Poldersveldt	Gelderland	Conservative (Catholic)	
Onderdendam	Geert Reinders	Groningen	Pragmatic liberal	
Ridderkerk	Willem Wijnaendts	South Holland	Pragmatic liberal	
Roermond	Johan Lodewijk Matthias Leclercq	Limburg	Pragmatic liberal	
Rotterdam I	Engel Pieter de Monchy	South Holland	Pragmatic liberal	
Rotterdam II	Abram van Rijckevorsel	South Holland	Pragmatic liberal	
Ruurlo	Jacob van Zuylen van Nijevelt	Gelderland	Pragmatic liberal	
Schiedam	Karel Arnoldus Poortman	South Holland	Thorbeckian liberal	
Sittard	Johannes Jacobus Lambrechts	Limburg	Pragmatic liberal	
Sluis	Daniël van Eck	Zeeland	Thorbeckian liberal	
Sneek	Pieter Jacob Costerus	Friesland	Pragmatic liberal	
Tilburg	Jacobus Arnoldus Mutsaers	North Brabant	Conservative (Catholic)	
Utrecht	Jan Karel van Goltstein	Utrecht	Pragmatic liberal	
Venlo	Pieter Lodewijk de Lom de Berg	Limburg	Conservative (Catholic)	
Winschoten	Jan Freerks Zijlker	Groningen	Thorbeckian liberal	
IJsselstein	Elisa Cornelis Unico van Doorn	Utrecht	Conservative	
Zaandam	Hendrik Jan Smit	North Holland	Pragmatic liberal	
Zaltbommel	Edmond Willem van Dam van Isselt	Gelderland	Pragmatic liberal	
Zevenbergen	Franciscus Johannes Jespers	North Brabant	Thorbeckian liberal	
Zierikzee	Gerrit Adriaan Fokker	Zeeland	Thorbeckian liberal	
Zutphen	Willem Hendrik Dullert	Gelderland	Thorbeckian liberal	
Zwolle	Bartholomeus Sloet tot Oldhuis	Overijssel	Thorbeckian liberal	
