= Leonardus Antonius Lightenvelt =

Dutch politician

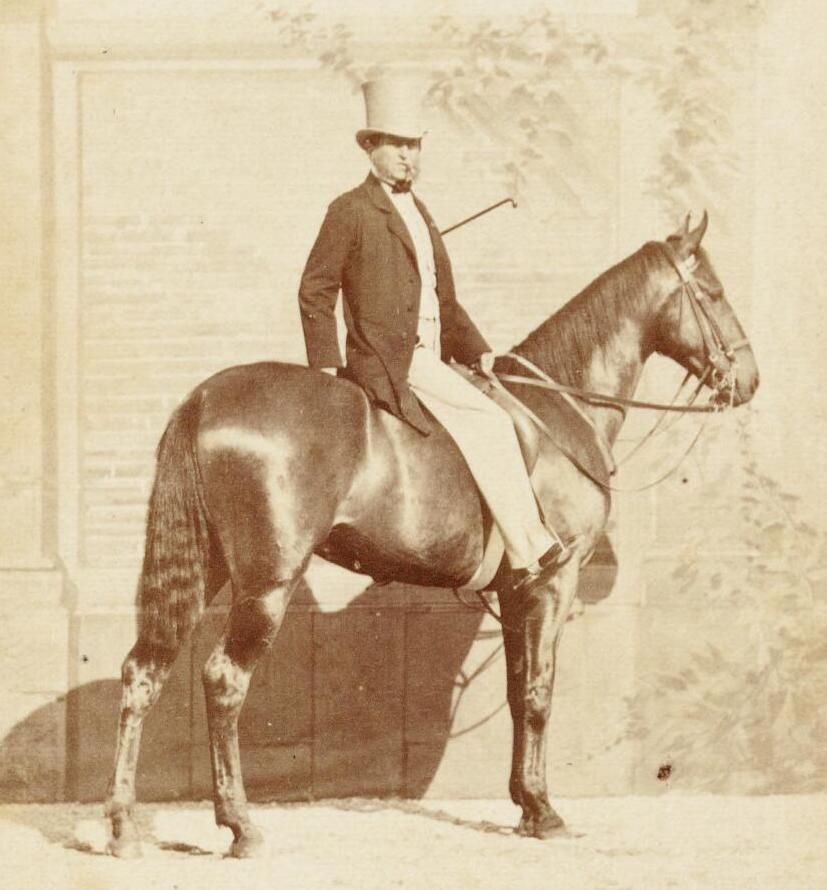
Leonardus Antonius Lightenvelt

Mr. Leonardus Antonius Lightenvelt (27 October 1795, 's-Hertogenbosch – 29 October 1873, Hyères) was a Dutch politician.
