= Otto Urban =

German trade unionist (1877–1947)

- Born: 25 March 1877; Berlin, Germany
- Died: 31 March 1947 (aged 70); Berlin, Germany
- Organizations: Central Union of Commercial Employees; Central Union of Employees; AfA-Bund; International Federation of Commercial, Clerical, Professional and Technical Employees; Free German Trade Union Federation

Otto Urban (25 March 1877 – 31 March 1947) was a German trade unionist.

Born in Berlin, Urban completed an apprenticeship as a commercial assistant. He then became an accountant, before moving to become an agent. In 1896, he joined the Free Union of Merchants of Berlin, and moved to work for Albrecht & Meister. In 1903, he became his union's first member of staff, with particular responsibility for its finances. From 1904, he represented the union on the Berlin Trades Council, and in 1908, he was elected as its treasurer. This experience led him to start campaigns in his own union, against on Sundays or after 20:00, and for the rights of women workers.

The union became the Central Union of Commercial Employees, and in 1912, it moved its headquarters to Berlin. Urban was elected as its new president, defeating Paul Richter, the executive's preferred candidate. The majority of the executive opposed World War I, and although Urban supported the Socialist Party of Germany's (SPD) pro-war line, he tried to maintain a conciliatory position, supporting his union's vote against the Auxiliary Services Act. As soon as the war ended, Urban looked to re-establish international links, and this led in 1921 to the formation of the International Federation of Commercial, Clerical, Professional and Technical Employees, with Urban becoming its president.

In 1919, Urban led the union into a merger with the Union of Office Employees of Germany, which formed the Central Union of Employees (ZdA), Urban becoming joint president. He argued that the union should be linked with the General German Trade Union Federation through its own secretariat, and this was established in 1921 as the AfA-Bund, Urban becoming a vice-president.

Urban retained his union positions until the Nazi government banned trade unions in 1933. He was then arrested, along with the ZdA's newspaper editor Georg Ucko, and charged with obscuring the union's balance sheets. He spent several weeks in Plötzensee Prison, then lived quietly while maintaining links with the international trade union movement, personally visiting individuals in several countries.

After World War II, Urban immediately joined the refounded SPD, and was a founding member of the Free German Trade Union Federation (FGDB). He took part in the founding conference of the FGDB's Union of Commercial, Office and Administrative Workers, and argued for SPD and Communist Party of Germany (KPD) members to work together in unions, although he opposed a merger of the SPD and the KPD. He died early in 1947, in Berlin.

Trade union offices
Preceded by Max Josephson	President of the Central Union of Commercial Employees; 1912–1919	Succeeded by Union merged
Preceded by New position	President of the Central Union of Employees; 1919–1933; With: Karl Giebel (1919–1927)	Succeeded by Union banned
Preceded by New position	President of the International Federation of Commercial, Clerical, Professional and Technical Employees; 1921–1933	Succeeded by Joseph Hallsworth
