= Central Union of Employees =

Former trade union in Germany

- Zentralverband der Angestellten
- Predecessor: Central Union of Commercial Employees; Union of Office Employees of Germany; Union of Insurance Workers
- Successor: Trade, Banking and Insurance Union
- Founded: 9 September 1919
- Dissolved: 2 May 1933
- Headquarters: Wilhelm-Heinrich-Straße 17, Saarbrücken
- Location: Germany
- Members: 363,521 (1920)
- Publication: Der freie Angestellte
- Affiliations: ADGB, AfA-Bund, ADB, FIET

The Central Union of Employees (German: Zentralverband der Angestellten, ZdA) was a trade union representing white collar, private sector workers in Germany.

The union was founded on 9 September 1919 at a conference in Weimar, when the Central Union of Commercial Employees merged with the Union of Office Employees of Germany, and the Union of Insurance Workers. It affiliated to the General German Trade Union Confederation (ADGB), and by 1920 had 363,521 members. On 29 May 1921, the Workers' Union of the Book and Newspaper Industry also joined the ZdA, while the German Union of Lawyers and Notaries joined in 1922.

In 1921, the ZdA became a founding constituent of the General Federation of Free Employees, leaving the AGDB, but remaining aligned with it through the Social Democratic Party of Germany (SPD). In the same year, it was a founding affiliate of the International Federation of Commercial, Clerical, Professional and Technical Employees (FIET), and its joint leader became the first leader of FIET. The union published Der freie Angestellte, initially edited by Paul Lange, and from 1930 by Georg Ucko.

In its early years, the union was divided between the leadership, generally SPD supporters, and the "Berlin Opposition", an alliance of Communist Party of Germany and Independent Social Democratic Party of Germany supporters.

The union was banned by the Nazi government in 1933. After World War II, the sector was covered by the Trade, Banking and Insurance Union and the German Salaried Employees' Union.

== Presidents ==
1919: Karl Giebel and Otto Urban
1927: Otto Urban
