= Hoogezand (electoral district) =

Hoogezand was an electoral district of the House of Representatives in the Netherlands from 1897 to 1918.

== Profile ==
The electoral district of Hoogezand was created in 1897 out of part of the Groningen district, which was reduced from two seats to one. Hoogezand's boundaries remained the same throughout the electoral district's existence. Fully located in the province of Groningen, it included the rural municipalities of Bedum, Haren, Hoogezand, Noorddijk, Slochteren and Ten Boer. It was a predominantly agricultural district.

The district's population increased slightly during its existence, from 37,562 in 1897 to 40,891 in 1909. A majority of 70.5% of the population was Reformed in 1897, though by 1909 this proportion had dropped to 64.6%. The proportion of Gereformeerden was around 19 to 20%, while Catholics made up a small minority of around 4 to 5% in the district. The share of "Others" grew from 5.3% in 1897 to 10.9% in 1909, which included 8.1% not belonging to any religious affiliation.

The district of Hoogezand was abolished upon the introduction of party-list proportional representation in 1918.

== Members ==
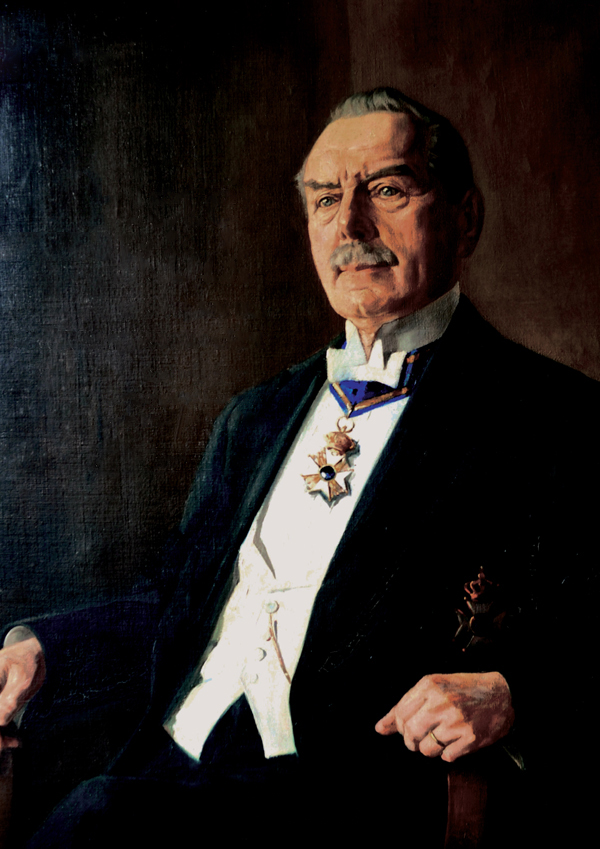
Pieter Rink

Throughout its existence, the Hoogezand changed hands between the Liberal Union and the Social Democratic Workers' Party (SDAP). Notable members include Kornelis ter Laan (SDAP), first elected in 1901, and Pieter Rink, the former minister of the interior, who defeated Ter Laan in 1909. In 1913, Hendrik Spiekman (SDAP) won not only the district of Hoogezand, but also the districts of Rotterdam I and Rotterdam II. He opted to represent Rotterdam II, thus triggering by-elections in the other two districts. Rink won back his district and continued to represent Hoogezand until its abolition in 1918.

Election	Member	Party	Ref.
1897	Jacob Dirk Veegens	Lib	
1901	Kornelis ter Laan	SDAP	
1905	Kornelis ter Laan	SDAP	
1909	Pieter Rink	Lib	
1913	Hendrik Spiekman	SDAP	
1913	Pieter Rink	Lib	
1917	Pieter Rink	Lib	

== Election results ==
=== Elections in the 1890s ===
1897 general election: Hoogezand
Candidate	Party	First round		Second round	
Candidate	Party	Votes	%	Votes	%
Jacob Dirk Veegens	Lib	1,705	46.22	2,800	63.72
A. Wiersinga	AR	1,380	37.41	1,594	36.28
Willem Vliegen	SDAP	380	10.30		
D.R. Mansholt	Rad	224	6.07		
Total		3,689	100.00	4,394	100.00
Valid votes		3,689	97.80	4,394	99.08
Invalid/blank votes		83	2.20	41	0.92
Total votes		3,772	100.00	4,435	100.00
Registered voters/turnout		5,334	70.72	5,334	83.15
Liberal gain					
Source: Kiesraad, Huygens Instituut)

=== Elections in the 1900s ===
1901 general election: Hoogezand
Candidate	Party	First round		Second round	
Candidate	Party	Votes	%	Votes	%
Kornelis ter Laan	SDAP	1,486	41.23	2,333	60.61
J.W. Rudolph	AR	1,102	30.58	1,516	39.39
Jacob Dirk Veegens	Lib	1,016	28.19		
Total		3,604	100.00	3,849	100.00
Valid votes		3,604	97.46	3,849	99.15
Invalid/blank votes		94	2.54	33	0.85
Total votes		3,698	100.00	3,882	100.00
Registered voters/turnout		5,410	68.35	5,410	71.76
SDAP gain					
Source: Kiesraad, Huygens Instituut (1, 2)

1905 general election: Hoogezand
Candidate	Party	First round		Second round	
Candidate	Party	Votes	%	Votes	%
Kornelis ter Laan	SDAP	2,320	42.35	3,193	63.38
H. de Wilde	AR	1,612	29.43	1,845	36.62
U.G. Schilthuis Jzn.	VD	1,546	28.22		
Total		5,478	100.00	5,038	100.00
Valid votes		5,478	98.99	5,038	99.19
Invalid/blank votes		56	1.01	41	0.81
Total votes		5,534	100.00	5,079	100.00
Registered voters/turnout		6,396	86.52	6,396	79.41
SDAP hold					
Source: Kiesraad, Huygens Instituut (1, 2)

1909 general election: Hoogezand
Candidate	Party	First round		Second round	
Candidate	Party	Votes	%	Votes	%
Kornelis ter Laan	SDAP	2,091	38.44	2,553	46.93
Pieter Rink	Lib	1,766	32.46	2,887	53.07
Albertus Zijlstra	AR	1,583	29.10		
Total		5,440	100.00	5,440	100.00
Valid votes		5,440	98.68	5,440	99.04
Invalid/blank votes		73	1.32	53	0.96
Total votes		5,513	100.00	5,493	100.00
Registered voters/turnout		6,921	79.66	6,921	79.37
Liberal gain					
Source: Kiesraad, Huygens Instituut (1, 2)

=== Elections in the 1910s ===
1913 general election: Hoogezand
Candidate	Party	First round		Second round	
Candidate	Party	Votes	%	Votes	%
Hendrik Spiekman	SDAP	2,575	40.59	2,845	55.06
Pieter Rink	Lib	2,124	33.48	2,322	44.94
R. Koppe	AR	1,645	25.93		
Total		6,344	100.00	5,167	100.00
Valid votes		6,344	98.60	5,167	98.83
Invalid/blank votes		90	1.40	61	1.17
Total votes		6,434	100.00	5,228	100.00
Registered voters/turnout		7,594	84.72	7,594	68.84
SDAP gain					
Source: Kiesraad, Huygens Instituut (1, 2)

1913 Hoogezand by-election
Candidate	Party	Votes	%
Pieter Rink	Lib	2,563	51.18
Theo van der Waerden	SDAP	2,445	48.82
Total		5,008	100.00
Valid votes		5,008	99.48
Invalid/blank votes		26	0.52
Total votes		5,034	100.00
Registered voters/turnout		7,594	66.29
Liberal gain			
Source: Kiesraad, Huygens Instituut

1917 general election: Hoogezand
Candidate	Party	Votes	%
Pieter Rink	Lib		
Total			
Registered voters/turnout		7,627	–
Liberal hold			
Source: Kiesraad, Huygens Instituut
