= Hendrik Spiekman =

Dutch politician (1874–1917)

- Hendrik Spiekman in 1913

Member of the House of Representatives
- In office 16 September 1913 – 18 November 1917
- Preceded by: Dirk de Klerk
- Succeeded by: Arie de Zeeuw
- Constituency: Rotterdam II

Personal details
- Born: 13 February 1874 Hoogezand, Netherlands
- Died: 18 November 1917 (aged 43) Rotterdam, Netherlands
- Party: SDB (1890–1893); SDAP (1894–1917)
- Spouse: Teelke Hommes (m. 1896)
- Children: 2, including Willem

Hendrik Spiekman (13 February 1874 – 18 November 1917) was a Dutch politician. A typographer by trade, Spiekman became involved in the labor movement in Rotterdam in the 1890s, and was one of the "twelve apostles" who co-founded the Social Democratic Workers' Party (SDAP) in 1894. He was elected to the Dutch House of Representatives from the Rotterdam II electoral district in the 1913 Dutch general election, serving as an MP until his death from leukemia in 1917.

== Early life ==
Hendrik Spiekman was born on 13 February 1874 in Hoogezand to Willem Spiekman, a shoemaker, and Janna Prins. Spiekman grew up in a poor family, his father dying when Hendrik was ten years old, and after completing primary school he became an apprentice at a printing shop. At the age of 16, Spiekman joined a socialist youth organization, attending its national conference in The Hague in 1890. In 1892, Spiekman began working for Tjerk Luitjes, an anarchist and an important figure in the Social Democratic League (SDB) in the northern Netherlands, and Spiekman would participate in several demonstrations led by Luitjes. The two eventually broke over their differences in opinion over what tactics to use, and Spiekman was fired by Luitjes in July 1894. Spiekman had previously left the SDB entirely after it passed a motion in December 1893 renouncing participation in elections.

In 1894, Spiekman was one of the "twelve apostles " who co-founded the Social Democratic Workers' Party (SDAP), becoming an SDAP propagandist in North Brabant. He would remain part of the SDAP's executive until 1912. In 1896, Spiekman moved to Rotterdam, where he found work as a typographer at the printing firm of social democratic publisher Harman Masereeuw. He became involved in the still small socialist movement in Rotterdam, and quickly became well-liked among his comrades and among many non-socialist workers due to his writing and advocacy for the interests of the working class. During this period, Spiekman held functions in the General Dutch Typographers' League, and frequently wrote for socialist newspapers and publications.

== Political career ==
In 1901, Spiekman was elected as a member of the Rotterdam municipal council, becoming the first socialist municipal councilor of a major city. Due to the SDAP's unpopularity following the 1903 railroad strike, Spiekman lost reelection in 1903, but returned to the municipal council in 1905. As a councilor, Spiekman mainly focused on housing and care for the poor. He set up the Bureau for Labor Law (Bureau van Arbeidsrecht) in 1903, an institution which Spiekman used to give advice to people who sought his assistance. Spiekman led the initiative to found a municipal housing service in Rotterdam, focusing on areas such as Spangen, though its first units were only completed after his death. He was also an early advocate of a progressive income tax as early as 1903. Despite his personal popularity in Rotterdam, Spiekman faced conflicts with others in the SDAP, including over his support of the National Labor Secretariat (NAS) until it voted against reformism in 1906, and fought with Pieter Jelles Troelstra over Spiekman writing in a newspaper published by Ernestus Philippus Hubertus van der Ven, whom Troelstra opposed. From 1913 to 1915, Spiekman formally led the local branch of the SDAP in Rotterdam, having previously been the informal leader of the Rotterdam labor movement including through his leadership of the Rotterdam Executives' League (Rotterdamsche Bestuurdersbond), which united various local organizations and groups within the socialist umbrella. Spiekman would remain a municipal councilor until his death in 1917.

Spiekman first ran for a seat in the House of Representatives in the 1905 Dutch general election in the Rotterdam I and Veendam electoral districts, losing in both seats to Dirk Fock and Eerke Albert Smidt respectively. In 1909 Spiekman ran in Rotterdam I again, losing to Hendrik Goeman Borgesius. In the 1913 Dutch general election, Spiekman was simultaneously elected in the districts of Rotterdam I, Hoogezand, and Rotterdam II, taking up the last seat. That same year, he was elected to the Provincial Council of South Holland. As an MP, Spiekman primarily spoke on affairs related to Rotterdam, including working conditions in its port and among workers at sea, and housing. During World War I, Spiekman also spoke on matters of rationing and food distribution. Spiekman's knowledge and dedication earned him the respect of many of his colleagues, including ideological opponents.

== Death ==
In 1916, Spiekman fell ill, and spent some time in a hospital in Ginneken in an attempt to recover. Hendrik Spiekman died of leukemia on 18 November 1917, and was buried with thousands of mourners in attendance.

In 1922, a memorial dedicated to Spiekman designed by H. P. Berlage was unveiled. It was removed in the 1960s, but rebuilt in 1981 and 1984.

== Personal life ==
Spiekman married Teelke Hommes on 16 December 1896. The couple had one daughter and one son together. His son Willem Spiekman became an important trade unionist in his own right, serving as general secretary of the International Federation of Commercial, Clerical, Professional and Technical Employees from 1934 to 1958.

== Bibliography ==
- de Zeeuw, A.B. (1951). Cocheret, C.A.; Lichtenauer, W.F. (eds.). Bekende Rotterdammers door hun stadgenoten beschreven. Rotterdam: W.L. & J. Brusse's Uitgeversmaatschappij N.V. pp. 22–30.
