= FIET =

FIET may stand for:

- Fellow of the Institution of Engineering and Technology, a status award by a British institution
- International Federation of Commercial, Clerical, Professional and Technical Employees, a former global union federation
