= Günter Stephan (trade unionist) =

German trade union leader

Günter Stephan (3 March 1922 – 11 April 2012) was a German trade union leader.

Born in Cologne, Stephan completed an apprenticeship as a bookseller. He was imprisoned for part of World War II, then after the war, began working for the government in Neuwied. He joined the Trade, Banking and Insurance Union (HBV), and in 1952 became its district secretary in Koblenz. The following year, he became the union's state chair and also district chair of the German Trade Union Confederation (DGB) in Neuwied. In 1958, he moved to become chair of the DGB in Essen, then in 1961, he was elected as vice president of the HBV.

From 1962, Stephan served full-time on the DGB's federal executive board, with responsibility initially for organisation and youth, and from 1969, for salaried workers, advertising, and the media.

In 1976, Stephan was elected as president of the International Federation of Commercial, Clerical, Professional and Technical Employees. He retired from the DGB in 1982, and the following year, from the international federation.

Trade union offices
Preceded by ?	Vice-President of the Trade, Banking and Insurance Union; 1961–1962	Succeeded by Anni Moser
Preceded by Alfred Allen	President of the International Federation of Commercial, Clerical, Professional and Technical Employees; 1976–1983	Succeeded by Tom Whaley
