= Gerrit Smit =

Gerrit Johan Adam Smit (8 April 1879 – 3 March 1934) was a Dutch trade union leader.

Born in Zutphen, Smit became an accountant, then in 1903 moved to Amsterdam. He joined the National Association of Trade and Office Clerks, and became the editor of its Amsterdam journal, De Handels- en Kantoor Clerk. The union had become divided between supporters of the Social Democratic Workers' Party (SDAP) and those who favoured remaining politically neutral. Smit initially favoured neutrality, but became involved in organising an international conference of clerical workers, and rapidly moved toward social democracy.

In 1905, Smit stood to become president of the union, but was defeated, in part because members felt he was too sympathetic to the SDAP. This experience led him to support a split, the General Dutch Union of Trade and Office Workers (ANBHK), which affiliated to the social democratic Dutch Confederation of Trade Unions (NVV). However, due to his senior position in a municipal gas works, Smit was not initially eligible for membership of the split, and instead joined the Association of Municipal Officials, becoming its secretary and editor of its journal. He quit in 1906, was re-elected in 1908, but in 1909 moved to work for Philips in Eindhoven. This meant he was able to join the ANBHK, and from 1910 until 1919 was its full-time treasurer. He moved to Amsterdam, and in 1911 was elected to its city council, for the SDAP.

Smit struggled to work with union secretary Edo Fimmen, who he felt was disorganised. In 1916, he succeeded Fimmen as secretary and also as editor of the union's journal, Onze Strijd. In 1920, he was elected as secretary of the re-established International Federation of Commercial, Clerical, Professional and Technical Employees, and in 1921, he moved to become president of the ANBHK, while remaining its leading figure. He held both positions until his death, in 1934.

Trade union offices
Preceded by Edo Fimmen	Leader of the General Dutch Union of Trade and Office Workers; 1916–1934	Succeeded by W. Brouwer
Preceded by Edo Fimmen as secretary of the International Commercial Employees' Secretariat	General Secretary of the International Federation of Commercial, Clerical, Professional and Technical Employees; 1920–1934	Succeeded by Willem Spiekman
