= Pieter Rink =

Dutch politician

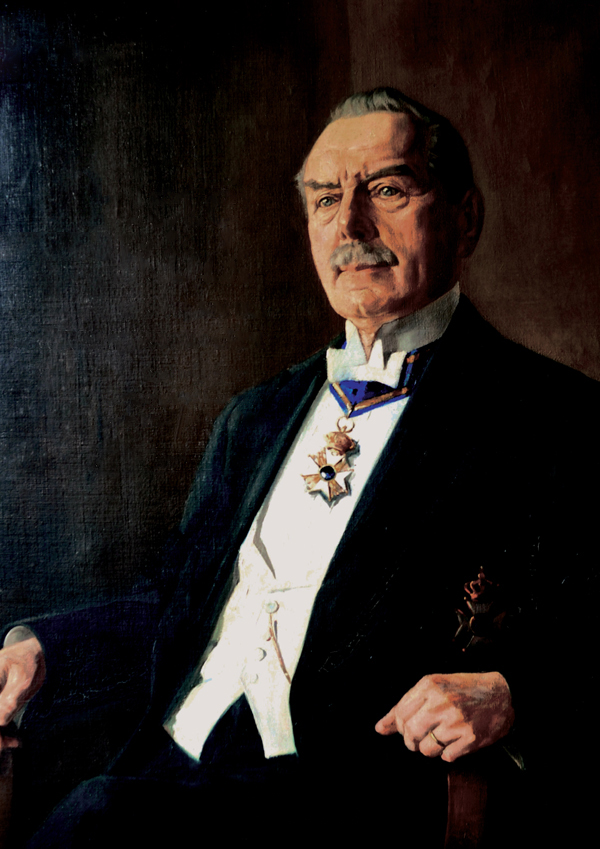
Portrait of Pieter Rink

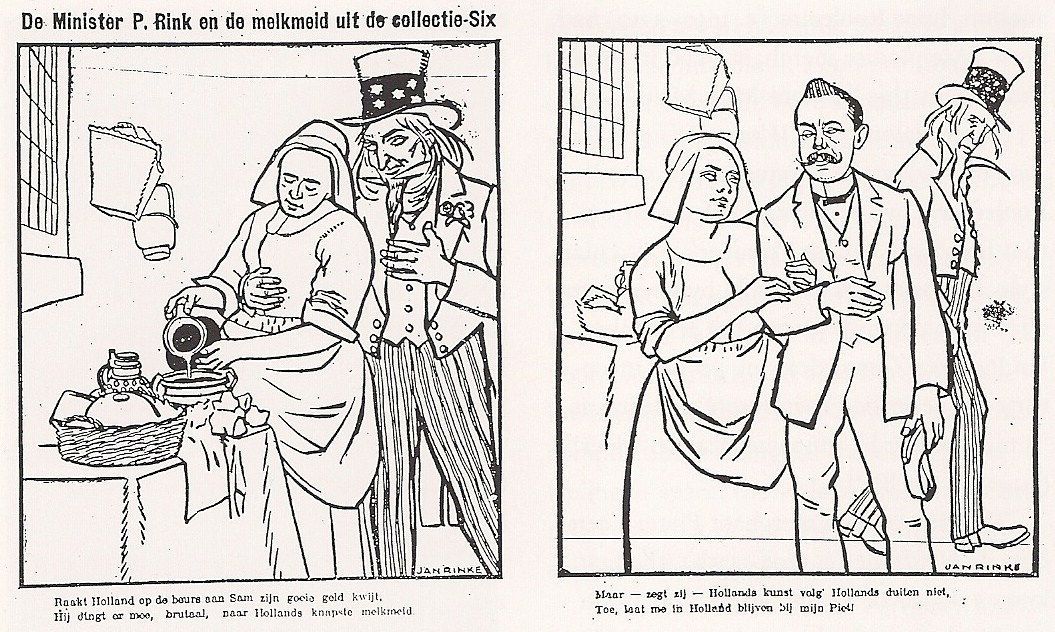
Cartoon of Pieter Rink with Vermeer's Milkmaid, 1907

Pieter Rink (13 August 1851 – 6 August 1941) was a Dutch politician.

Pieter Rink was born in Tiel, where he was a successful lawyer. He was a member of the Liberal Union and served in the municipal council of his city of birth (1883–1905) and was a member of the Provincial Council of Gelderland (1903–1905). In 1891 he was elected in the House of Representatives and remained a member until 1922 (except in the period 1905-1908 when he was Minister of the Interior). From July 1918 until April 1921 he was the chairman of the parliamentary group of the Liberal Union and from April 1921 till July 1922 he served as the first president of the Freedom League parliamentary party. In 1923 he was elected to the Senate, remaining a member until 1933. In the years prior to the introduction of universal suffrage in 1917, he was an ardent advocate of suffrage extension and was considered a "Takkiaan". This fact was underlined in the party brochure he co-authored, Het kiesrechtvraagstuk ("The Suffrage Question") which was published in 1903 and called for the introduction of universal suffrage, female suffrage and a reform of the electoral system.

Pieter Rinck joined the De Meester cabinet in 1905 as Minister of the Interior. This cabinet was very weak and incapable of introducing important reforms and it resigned in December 1907 (an earlier resignation in December 1906 was refused by Queen Wilhelmina).

After the merger of the Liberal Union and the League of Free Liberals in 1921, he joined the new conservative liberal party Freedom League.

Pieter Rink, who belonged to the Dutch Reformed Church, died on 6 August 1941 in The Hague.

== Party functions ==
- Member of the Liberal Union till 16 April 1921
- Member of the Freedom League from 16 April 1921
- Member of the Party Executive of the Liberal Union between 1891 and 1915
- Deputy Chairman of the Liberal Union from 1915 till 1920
- Provisional Chairman of the Liberal Union from January 1917 till April 1921
- Member of the Party Executive of the Liberale State Party "The Freedom League" from 16 April 1921 till 1924
- Deputy Chairman of the Liberal State Party "The Freedom League" from 1925 till April 1932
- Honorary Chairman of the Liberal State Party "The Freedom League"

== Literature ==
- Nederlands Patriciaat 1911, 1958

House of Representatives of the Netherlands
Preceded by Willem Rooseboom	Member for Arnhem; 1891–1905	Succeeded by Kornelis Eland
Preceded by Kornelis ter Laan	Member for Hoogezand; 1909–1918	District abolished
Political offices
Preceded by Abraham Kuyper	Minister of the Interior; 1905–1908	Theo Heemskerk
