= Jochen Richert =

German trade union leader

Jochen Richert (30 March 1938 – 3 March 1997) was a German trade union leader.

Born in Melsungen, Richert became a miner when he was sixteen, and joined the Union of Mining and Energy. He became increasingly involved in the union, until in 1960, he began working full-time for the German Trade Union Confederation (DGB), as its youth secretary for Fulda and Bad Hersfeld. In 1964, he was promoted to become youth secretary for the whole of Hesse, then in 1971, he became chair of the DGB in Hesse. He also became chair of the DGB's education wing.

In 1986, Richert was elected to the national board of the DGB, and in 1990, he additionally became president of the DGB's education wing. In 1991, he also became president of the International Federation of Commercial, Clerical, Professional and Technical Employees. He retired in 1995, due to poor health, and died in 1997.

Trade union offices
Preceded by Bengt Lloyd	President of the International Federation of Commercial, Clerical, Professional and Technical Employees; 1991–1994	Succeeded by Gary Nebeker
