= Max Josephson =

German trade union leader

Max Josephson (29 January 1868 – 2 February 1938) was a German trade union leader.

Born to a Jewish family in Oberbarnim, Josephson became an office assistant in Hamburg, and in 1892 was a founder of a small trade union, initially aiming to reduce the number of apprentices in the trade. He was appointed as the auditor of the union and, although he initially hoped that the union was stay out of politics, he accepted a decision to align with the Free Trade Unions, which were linked to the Social Democratic Party of Germany (SPD).

The union did not initially grow, so at the start of 1893, Josephson proposed that it was dissolved. The proposal was voted down, and he was instead elected as vice president, in which role he argued the unions should campaign for shorter working hours and no work on Sundays or public holidays. In 1894, he was elected as president of the union, and by this time, he was also coming to prominence in the Hamburg Trades Council. In 1895, he joined the SPD.

In 1897, Josephson supported forming the national Central Union of Commercial Employees, and he was elected as the union's secretary. He prioritised trying to recruit women as members, by organising dance lessons. He briefly served as editor of the union's newspaper, Handlungsgehülfen-Blatt, in 1898. In 1899, he resigned as secretary of the union, to set up his own bookshop, but remained involved in the union.

Josephson stood unsuccessfully for the SPD in both the 1901 and 1904 elections. In 1901, he again began working for the union, and in 1902, he was elected as its president. Initially, membership remained small, but after Josephson decided to focus on recruiting workers at consumer co-operatives, it began growing more rapidly, reaching 5,815 in 1905.

Josephson supported the formation of the International Commercial Employees' Secretariat, in 1904, and served on a voluntary basis as its secretary. He stood down from his trade union posts in 1911, moving to work in the purchasing department of the German consumer associations' combine.

In 1933, Josephson was fired, due to being a Jew. He found work as a commercial clerk in Hamburg, and died in 1938.

Trade union offices
Preceded by Gustav Segnitz	President of the Central Union of Commercial Employees; 1902–1911	Succeeded by Otto Urban
Preceded by New position	General Secretary of the International Commercial Employees' Secretariat; 1904–1910	Succeeded by Edo Fimmen
