= Willem Spiekman =

Dutch trade unionist

Willem Geert Spiekman (7 September 1899 – 3 November 1975) was a Dutch trade union leader.

Born in Rotterdam, his father, Hendrik Spiekman, was prominent in the local labour movement. He worked in a number of office jobs before moving to Amsterdam in 1921, where he worked in the editorial section of Het Volk. He then became the assistant to Roel Stenhuis, leader of the Dutch Confederation of Trade Unions and general secretary of the International Federation of Factory Workers. Spiekman devoted much of his time to the international, acting as an organiser, interpreter and minute-taker. However, declining membership of the federation led Stenhuis to make him redundant in 1923.

Spiekman briefly worked as an insurance inspector, but at the end of the year was recruited as assistant to Gerrit Smit, general secretary of the International Federation of Commercial, Clerical, Professional and Technical Employees (FIET). During this period, he joined the Independent Socialist Party, and this led the Dutch trade union movement to oppose him succeeding as general secretary of FIET on Smit's death, in 1934. However, Spiekman's profile among other members led to him defeating Cor Jacobsen for the position.

During the 1930s, the international trade union movement was increasingly disrupted by the rise of fascism. Spiekman travelled around Europe, maintain links with current and banned affiliates of FIET, although he was unable to enter Germany after 1938, when the Gestapo made plans to arrest him. By the time of the German occupation of the Netherlands, in 1940, Spiekman had transferred the federation's assets to the United Kingdom. He destroyed its archive, and went into hiding.

Spiekman hid in Ermelo, and then in Nunspeet, teaching modern languages and selling lottery tickets. His cover was so good that, after 1942, it was widely believed that he had died. On liberation, he immediately began reorganising the federation, attending the council of the International Federation of Trade Unions in London, and organising its first post-war conference in Malmo in 1946. At the conference, some delegates complained that Spiekman had invited representatives of German trade unions, even though they had been opponents of the Nazis.

Spiekman argued that the international trade secretariats should have autonomy within the new World Federation of Trade Unions, and when this seemed unobtainable, he affiliated FIET to the new International Confederation of Free Trade Unions. After Friedrich Hillegeist was elected as president of FIET, the two struggled to work together, leading Spiekman to stand down in 1958. He instead moved to work for the International Institute of Social History, and wrote his autobiography.

Trade union offices
Preceded by Gerrit Smit	General Secretary of the International Federation of Commercial, Clerical, Professional and Technical Employees; 1934–1958	Succeeded by Erich Kissel
