= Siegfried Aufhäuser =

German politician and union leader

Chairman of the General Federation of Free Employees
- In office October 1921 – March 1933

Member of the Reichstag
- In office 7 March 1921 – 1933

Personal details
- Born: 1 May 1884 Augsburg, Kingdom of Bavaria, German Empire
- Died: 6 December 1969 (aged 85) Berlin, West Germany
- Party: SPD (1922–35, 1951–); USPD (1918–22); DV (1908–14)
- Spouse: Anna Stein (m. 1910)

Siegfried Aufhäuser (1 May 1884 – 6 December 1969) was a German politician and union leader who was chairman of the white-collar General Federation of Free Employees (AfA-Bund) from 1921 until 1933.

Aufhäuser joined the Independent Social Democratic Party of Germany (USPD) in 1918 before becoming a member of the Social Democratic Party of Germany (SPD) after the USPD's dissolution in 1922. He was a member of the Reichstag from 1921 to 1933. A prominent member of the party's left-wing, he viewed the political reality of the Weimar Republic from the perspective of class struggle, emphasising the role of trade unions in politics. After the Nazi rise to power, Aufhäuser was arrested several times in 1933 and fled into exile in May. He was expelled from the SPD in 1935 for advocating an alliance with the Communist Party. From 1941, he lived in New York City and became a journalist for the exile community. He returned to Germany in 1951 and was regional chairman of the German Salaried Employees' Union until 1959.

== Early life ==
Aufhäuser was born on 1 May 1884 in Augsburg to a bourgeois family. His father Hermann was a wealthy manufacturer, and his three siblings all went on to lead successful careers in business and academics. Both of Aufhäuser's parents were of Jewish background. In his youth, he attended a business school before becoming a clerk at a manufacturing firm in Munich. By 1910 he had married, and owned a factory there.

== Early activism ==
Aufhäuser joined the Association of German Salespeople (VdDK), a nationalist-oriented white-collar employee organisation, while working as a clerk in 1903. He quickly became engaged in political work for the group; around this time, he wrote an article for its newspaper criticising the antisemitism espoused by the rival National German Association of Clerks. In 1905, at the age of 21, he moved to Berlin and became chairman of the VdDK's branch there.

Over the following years, Aufhäuser became further involved in politics both inside and outside the VdDK. In 1908, he co-founded the left-liberal Democratic Union. At this point, Aufhäuser supported legal equality for all citizens, but opposed the goal of overthrowing capitalism. He believed that both white- and blue-collar workers had common interests in opposition to the capitalist class, rejecting assertions by theorists such as Karl Kautsky that salaried workers comprised a separate class above the proletariat. For this reason, he remained distant from socialism and the SPD. The Democratic Union won less than 30,000 votes (0.24%) in the 1912 German federal election, well short of securing any seats. This triggered an exodus of many leaders who believed it a lost cause, though Aufhäuser attempted unsuccessfully to keep it afloat over the next two years.

In 1913, Aufhäuser gave up his factory in Frankfurt to take a job as a research assistant for the Federation of Technical and Industrial Employees (Butib) in Berlin. Compared to the VdDK, Butib was organised along the lines of a trade union. Its members saw themselves as skilled workers rather than budding entrepreneurs and were more radical in their outlook. Aufhäuser advanced rapidly within Butib; less than a year after joining, the union executive recommended that he be appointed secretary of the Working Group for Uniform Employee Rights, a coalition of twelve white-collar unions comprising 130,000 members in total.

After the outbreak of the First World War, Aufhäuser was spared from military service due to poor eyesight, and became heavily involved in work for Butib. In 1916, reorganisation of labour relations saw the establishment of a tripartite model for economic policy, involving representatives of the state, capital, and unions. As leader of the largest white-collar organisation, the Cartel of Free Employee Federations (AfA), Aufhäuser now became an important figure on the national stage. In this position, he worked with blue-collar unions to improve the rights of workers, such as establishing employee committees and arbitration boards. Though he had initially supported the war, by early 1918 he had turned against it, describing it as "a consequence of imperialism". He was also pessimistic about its consequences for labour, believing that solidarity between white- and blue-collar workers was essential to ensure that their conditions improved post-war.

== Weimar Republic and AfA-Bund ==
The November Revolution marked a turning point for Aufhäuser. Despite the urging of Hellmut von Gerlach to join the left-liberal German Democratic Party, he chose to join the Independent Social Democratic Party of Germany (USPD) on 1 November. Here he called for the socialisation of industry, and denounced the SPD's plans for the election of a National Assembly, claiming it would undermine the labour movement by transferring the workers' newly-won power to the state. As workers' and soldiers' councils began to take power throughout the country in November, Aufhäuser worked with the AfA to bring white-collar workers into the movement. On the 17th, a group of radical salaried unions in Berlin organised a demonstration of 20,000 employees who expressed their support for the revolution and solidarity with the workers.

The unions were ultimately unsuccessful in establishing power after the November Revolution, but the new Weimar Republic guaranteed rights for labour and permitted the establishment of workers' councils within companies. In 1921, the AfA reorganised itself as the General Federation of Free Employees (AfA-Bund) and joined the General German Trade Union Federation (ADGB). Re-elected secretary with a resounding margin of 100 votes to one, Aufhäuser was committed to linking white-collar workers with blue-collar unions without sacrificing their independence. He approached this task pragmatically and embraced a diversity of views and backgrounds, emphasising that a commitment to socialism did not mean a commitment to any particular political party, nor a rejection of other beliefs such as Christianity. He also accepted the lack of mention of class struggle in the AfA-Bund's program in order not to alienate some of its constituent groups.

The labour movement flourished in the following years, including the white-collar unions: the AfA grew from a low of 57,000 members in 1917 to over 700,000 just three years later in June 1920. At this point, it represented 42% of all organised white-collar workers in Germany, with membership drawn from numerous professions. Despite this, Aufhäuser was largely unsuccessful in his attempts to bring the white-collar into the labour movement; a majority remained organised within bourgeois employees' federations. Indeed, the class consciousness stirred by the revolution waned in the following decade. By 1931, the AfA's membership had fallen to 477,000, while the various conservative organisations numbered 927,000. The bourgeois groups rejected Aufhäuser's notion of shared interests between white- and blue-collar, and instead worked through bourgeois parties to secure special protections for employees separate from those of other workers. As a Jew and member of the USPD, Aufhäuser himself was a frequent target of attacks by conservative federations.

== Political career ==
Aufhäuser worked with the ADGB and other union leaders in organising the general strike which defeated the Kapp Putsch, establishing the unions as the foremost defenders of the republic. He remained with the USPD after most of its membership established the Communist Party of Germany, and entered the Reichstag on the USPD list in 1921. In 1922, he followed the remainder of the party in reunifying with the SPD. In the Reichstag, he was the SPD's spokesman on social insurance; he also held a number of important posts within the party and state economic bodies.

A member of the SPD's left-wing, Aufhäuser expressed a critical support for the republic. He described it as "a form of state that had to be defended" but also a "battleground for socialism", emphasising that it was still controlled by the interests of capital. His outlook was defined by class struggle: in his view, the SPD must use its electoral power to pursue the interests of the workers in a concrete manner in order to win their support, and only then would they have the strength to develop socialism. He also took a pessimistic view of the SPD's governing prospects. At the SPD's Kiel conference in 1927, Aufhäuser and fellow left-winger Toni Sender led a minority group who opposed the plan to enter government after the upcoming elections. They believed that coalitions with unreliable liberal and bourgeois partners would sacrifice workers' interests and cost support among the SPD's core constituency. They argued that the party would be best served by remaining in opposition and using both parliamentary and extraparliamentary means to fight the capitalist state, rather than entangle themselves with it by entering government.

The SPD entered into a coalition with the Zentrum, DVP, and DDP after the 1928 federal election. During this time, Aufhäuser called for the termination of the coalition if the SPD could not advance its agenda. Tensions came to a boiling point after the onset of the Great Depression, and the government ultimately fell in March 1930 after a dispute over the unemployment insurance program. The SPD returned to opposition and a new conservative cabinet under Heinrich Brüning was formed, of which Aufhäuser was fiercely critical.

== End of the republic ==
The September 1930 election saw losses for the SPD and the emergence of the Nazi Party as a major force. The Brüning cabinet relied on the support of the SPD to govern, which the party leadership reluctantly provided, fearing that its collapse would give the Nazis an opening to form government. Aufhäuser strongly opposed this "lesser evil" strategy. In his view, the SPD's losses resulted from their failure to promote workers' interests during the previous term, which had caused many workers to support the Nazis instead. He believed that continuing to tie themselves to Brüning's harsh anti-labour policies was not only ethically unacceptable, but a recipe for further electoral disaster. Despite his criticism of the SPD's approach, Aufhäuser held party unity and loyalty above all else, and mounted a partial defence of toleration policy at the Leipzig congress in 1931 in order to defuse tensions and minimise the risk of a split in the party.

Aufhäuser also focused his energy on winning over salaried employees through the AfA-Bund. At its congress in October 1931, he advocated mass education to enhance class consciousness and understanding of socialism among white-collar workers, who constituted one of Germany's fastest-growing social groups. He successfully proposed that a demand for "restructuring of the economy" be adopted into the AfA-Bund's program, and focused much of his energy into pursuing this goal over the following 18 months. He advocated radical change to the structure of the economy including, in the short term, the creation of public works programs to stimulate employment and a shortened work week. Longer term, he also called for the nationalisation of resources, industry, insurance, and banking, the expropriation of land to support peasants, and the establishment of a planned economy. Aufhäuser's ideas had only marginal support among the union movement, who instead favoured deficit spending to ease the recession. However, much of the SPD leadership feared that such a solution would lead to renewed inflation and a repeat of the 1923 crisis. By early 1932, they were beginning to warm to Aufhäuser's proposals as an alternative, and he was tasked with drafting a detailed platform for the planned 1933 congress.

Aufhäuser was one of a small number of prominent SPD members to advocate limited cooperation between the SPD and KPD, though these suggestions were firmly rejected by the leadership of both parties. After the resignation of the cabinet in May 1932 and Brüning's replacement by Franz von Papen, the SPD were no longer tied down by support for a right-wing government, but now feared reprisal from the increasingly authoritarian state. By this time, much of the SPD's energy was directed toward the preservation of the republic itself. Aufhäuser advocated the mobilisation of the Iron Front for a general strike in the event of an attack against the constitution, but the SPD and trade union leadership rejected this, fearing it would trigger a civil war which they would be doomed to lose.

Aufhäuser analysed the Nazi success in the July 1932 election from a class perspective. While grave, he claimed the result demonstrated that the working class had turned against capitalism and liberalism. He believed that the Nazis could be kept out of government and that the Reichstag's now theoretically anti-capitalist majority could pass legislation to restructure the economy and ease the economic situation. Combined with efforts by the Iron Front to educate and persuade workers of all classes that the Nazi promise was a sham, Aufhäuser believed that the SPD could break their electoral coalition and win back mass support to preserve the republic.

After the Prussian coup, however, Aufhäuser's strategy failed to materialise. The ADGB and unions, fearful of state repression, sought to accommodate the increasingly authoritarian government rather than oppose it. The SPD also failed to mount a substantial challenge in the November election and, though the Nazis' support declined, Hitler was appointed Chancellor in January 1933. The March 1933 election saw Hitler's coalition win a majority among harsh persecution of the opposition, and the unions further ingratiated themselves to the Nazis, hoping to avoid the same fate. Unable to convince even his own union to remain committed to the SPD, Aufhäuser resigned from the AfA-Bund three weeks after the election. Korthaase suggests that he did this not only for ideological reasons, but also to spare the union the "burden" of having a prominent Jewish leader, which made the AfA-Bund a high priority target for the emerging Nazi regime.

== Exile and later life ==
After being arrested multiple times in the following months, Aufhäuser fled the country and arrived in Saarbrücken in the Territory of the Saar Basin on 4 May 1933. He was elected to the executive committee of the Sopade, the SPD's organisation in exile, but clashed with the moderate majority who opposed his efforts to build a popular front with the communists. As a result, he was expelled in January 1935. He then moved to Paris, then to Prague until 1938, and then London. In May 1941, he arrived in New York City with his wife. There, he was active as a member of the exile community and wrote frequently. He joined a number of exile organisations and co-founded the Council for a Democratic Germany.

Aufhäuser returned to West Germany in 1951 and became chairman of the Berlin branch of the German Salaried Employees' Union. He held this position until retiring in 1959. He also rejoined the SPD and served as a delegate at the 1954, 1956, and 1958 party congresses, advocating for the party to fight against capitalist interests and calling for a new economic order. Aufhäuser died in Berlin in 1969 at the age of 85.

== Bibliography ==
- Christian Zentner, Friedemann Bedürftig (1991). The Encyclopedia of the Third Reich. Macmillan, New York. ISBN 0-02-897502-2
