= Dirk de Klerk =

Dutch politician (1852–1920)

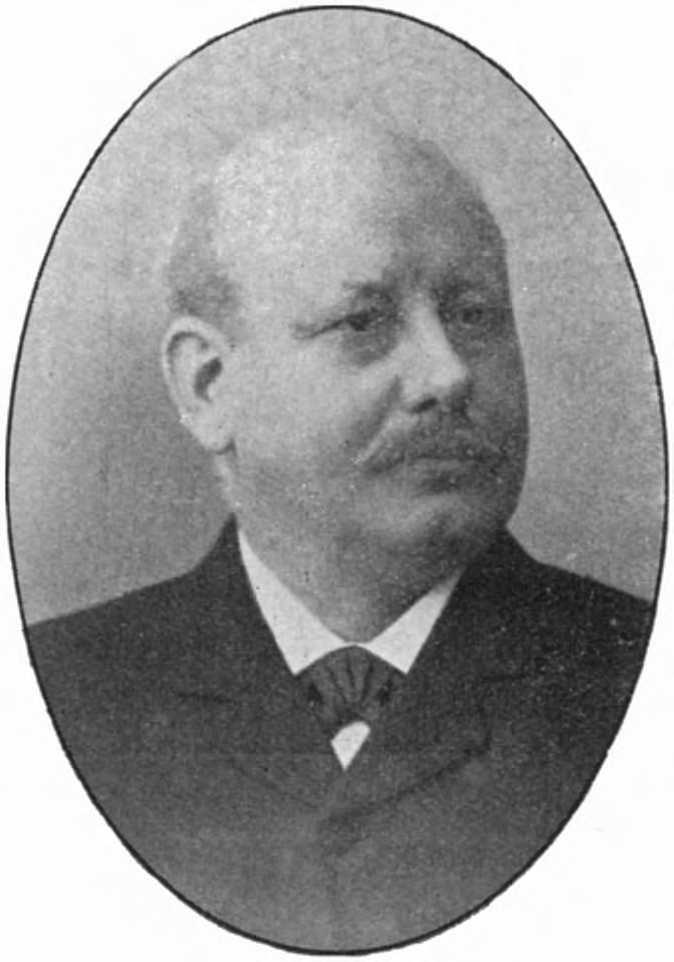
- De Klerk, c. 1905

Member of the House of Representatives
- In office 21 September 1897 – 15 September 1913
- Succeeded by: Hendrik Spiekman
- Constituency: Rotterdam II

Member of the Provincial Council of South Holland
- In office 1 July 1919 – 23 July 1920

Member of the Rotterdam Municipal Council
- In office 18 June 1896 – 6 September 1909; 27 October 1910 – 23 July 1920

Personal details
- Born: 6 January 1852 Rotterdam, Netherlands
- Died: 23 July 1920 (aged 68) Scheveningen, Netherlands
- Party: Liberal Union (until 1918); General Liberal Party (1918); General State Party (1918 onwards)

Dirk de Klerk (Dutch: [ˈdɪr(ə)ɡ də ˈklɛr(ə)k]; 6 January 1852 – 23 July 1920) was a Dutch politician. Born in Rotterdam, he worked as a metalsmith, and he was on the board of the General Dutch Workers' Union. He served on the Rotterdam Municipal Council between 1896 and 1920, with a short interruption, and on the House of Representatives between 1897 and 1913, representing the Rotterdam II electoral district. De Klerk started out as a member of the Liberal Union, but he founded the General Liberal Party to participate in the 1918 general election as lead candidate. He did not win a seat, and he joined the General State Party. De Klerk sat on the Provincial Council of South Holland from July 1919 until his death on 23 July 1920 in Scheveningen.
