= Emmy Kaemmerer =

German politician (1890–1976)

Emmy Kaemmerer (21 May 1890 – 1976) was a German politician, representative of the Social Democratic Party. She also went by the names Emmy Leonhard, Elisa Kaemmerer, Emmy de Jäger, Alida de Jäger, Alida Leonhard, and Alida von Leonhard Kämmerer.

Kaemmerer was born in Hamburg.

In 1919–20, she was a member of the Hamburg Parliament.

Kaemmererer's partner was Edo Fimmen and they had two daughters together, Elisa and Alida.

She died in Switzerland in 1976.
