= Edo Fimmen =

Dutch trade unionist (1881–1942)

Eduard Carl Fimmen
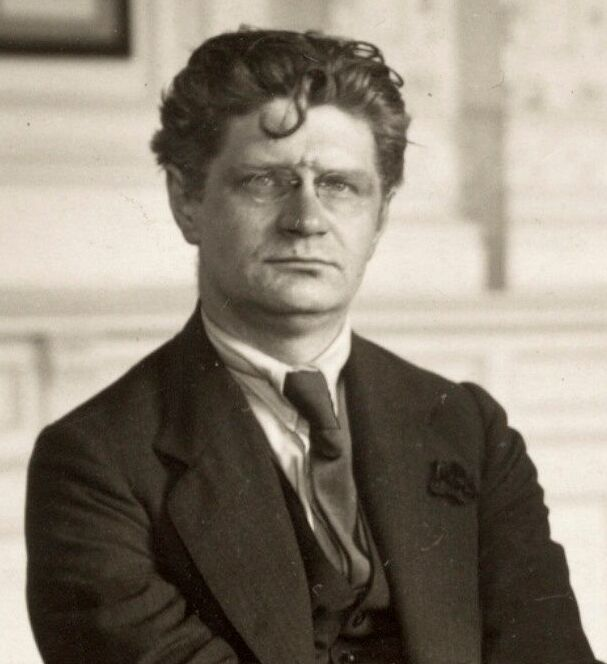
- Born: 18 June 1881; Nieuwer-Amstel, Netherlands
- Died: 14 December 1942 (aged 61); Cuernavaca, Mexico
- Other names: Edo Fimmen, Nel Jaccard
- Occupation: Trade unionist
- Employer: International Transport Workers' Federation
- Title: General Secretary of the ITF
- Term: 1919–1942
- Movement: Christian anarchism
- Spouse: Julie Lucie Cornelia Michen
- Partner: Alida Kammerer
- Children: 4
- Parent(s): Eduard Hermann Johann Fimmen; Therese Ansoul

Eduard Carl Fimmen (18 June 1881 – 14 December 1942), also known as Edo Fimmen, was a Dutch trade unionist.

== Early life ==
Fimmen was born in Nieuwer-Amstel on 18 June 1881. His father was a merchant, Eduard Hermann Johann Fimmen, and his mother was Therese Ansoul. They were both of German origin. He married Julie Lucie Cornelia (Nelly) Michen on 18 January 1906, and they were to have a daughter and son. In December he met the German journalist Alida Kammerer by whom he had two daughters while remaining married to his wife.

From 1894 to 1899, Fimmen attended the Amsterdam Trade Public School (1894–1899). Fimmen, developed a talent for languages, writing and speaking French, German and English fluently. He was able to earn money as a translator following his father's death when he was sixteen.

Following a tour of duty in the Dutch Army he was drawn to the Salvation Army, through Christian commitment rather than a liking of military organisation. After meeting Lodewijk van Mierop, a member of the Dutch Reformed church and Menno Huizinga, a baptist – both theology students – he became involved in a Christian Anarchist magazine Vrede (peace) and the Rein Leven Movement, having his letters published under the pseudonym Edo. The group brought together young men of varying backgrounds, in term of education, employment, knowledge and faith, but who shared a desire for complete purity of body and soul. Fimmen and Huizinga were principle editors to this group and Fimmen devoted his spare time from 1901 until 1908 to the group. In particular they agitated against prostitution. For most of this period he chaired the Amsterdam meetings and bi-annual conferences. However, from 1905 disagreements arose over "free" and "bourgeois" marriages. By 1908 Fimmen was amongst a group who considered the movement as no longer anarchist and after rowing with Meirop he left.

Fimmen had also been active in the Society for the Suppression of the Neo-Malthusian using the names Nel Jaccard and Edo for articles in Tegen Leugen en Geweld (Against Lies and Violence), edited by Van Mierop. He translated material from the Conference of International Anti-militarist League (26–28 June 1904) held in Amsterdam. Encouraged by Domela Nieuwenhuis he chaired the last day of the conference where the Christian anarchists - as socialists, Christians and revolutionaries - advocated Conscientious objection and a general strike in the event of war.

== Trade unionism ==
Fimmen worked as a clerk, probably for the American Petroleum Company and during the 1903 strike joined the National Union of Commercial and Office Employees. Allied to G L Niermeyer, he was elected secretary. He was then obliged to give up his job, and supported himself through translation work for J. C. Dalmeyer. On 22 October 1905 he was one of the founder members of the General Dutch Union of Trade and Office Workers. He was the treasurer from 1905 to 1907, and then Secretary from 1907 to 1916. He also edited Onze Strijd (Our Struggle) from 1909 to 1916. They successfully campaigned for equal pay for men and women in 1909.

From 1919 to 1942, Fimmen served as General Secretary of the International Transport Workers' Federation.

== Later life ==
In 1937 he was nominated for the Nobel Peace Prize by Vladimír Clementis In the early phases of World War II in Europe, he organized couriers for Soviet military intelligence and also assisted the British. He died in Cuernavaca on 14 December 1942.

== Books ==
=== Fimmen's Translations into Dutch ===
From German

- De kunst van het arbeiden, Carl Hilty, (1903)
- Geluk, Carl Hilty, (1903)

From English:

- Nyria, Mrs. Campbell Pread, (1904);

From the French:

- Wat volwassen meisjes wel eens mogen weten, Ch. Burlureaux, (1905),

=== Books by Fimmen ===
- Labour's Alternative: The United States of Europa or Europe Limited (1924) Labour Publishing Company, London

== See also ==
- Anarchism in the Netherlands

Trade union offices
Preceded by New position	General Secretary of the General Dutch Union of Trade and Office Workers; 1905–1916	Succeeded by Gerrit Smit
Preceded by Max Josephson	General Secretary of the International Commercial Employees' Secretariat; 1910–1914	Succeeded by Gerrit Smit as secretary of FIET
Preceded by Hermann Jochade	General Secretary of the International Transport Workers' Federation; 1919–1942	Succeeded by Jaap Oldenbroek
Preceded by New position	General Secretary of the International Federation of Trade Unions; 1919–1923; With: Jan Oudegeest; Johannes Sassenbach (1922–1923); John W. Brown (1923)	Succeeded by John W. Brown; Jan Oudegeest; Johannes Sassenbach
