= General Dutch Union of Trade and Office Workers =

Dutch trade union

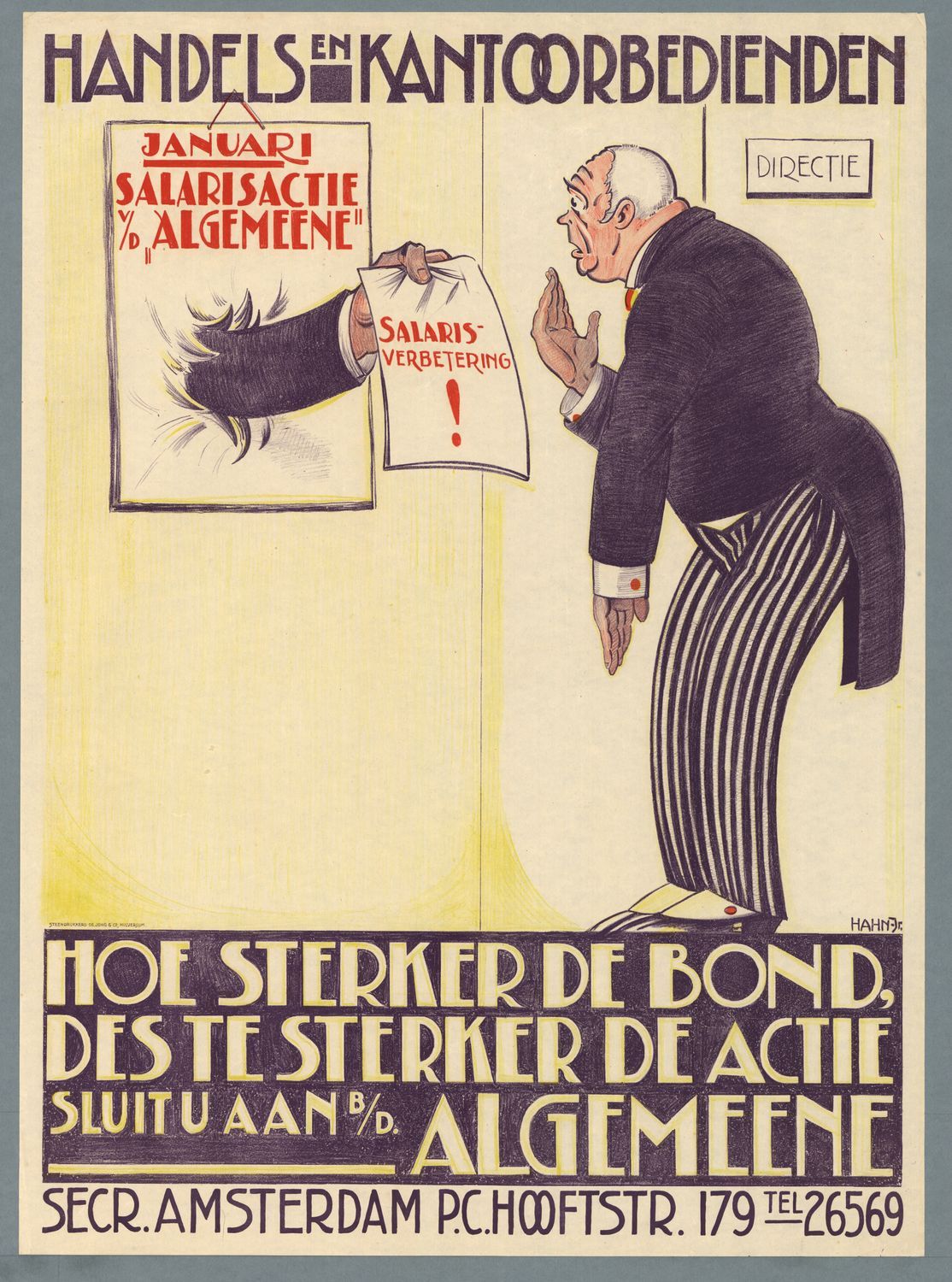
Poster designed by Albert Hahn jr.

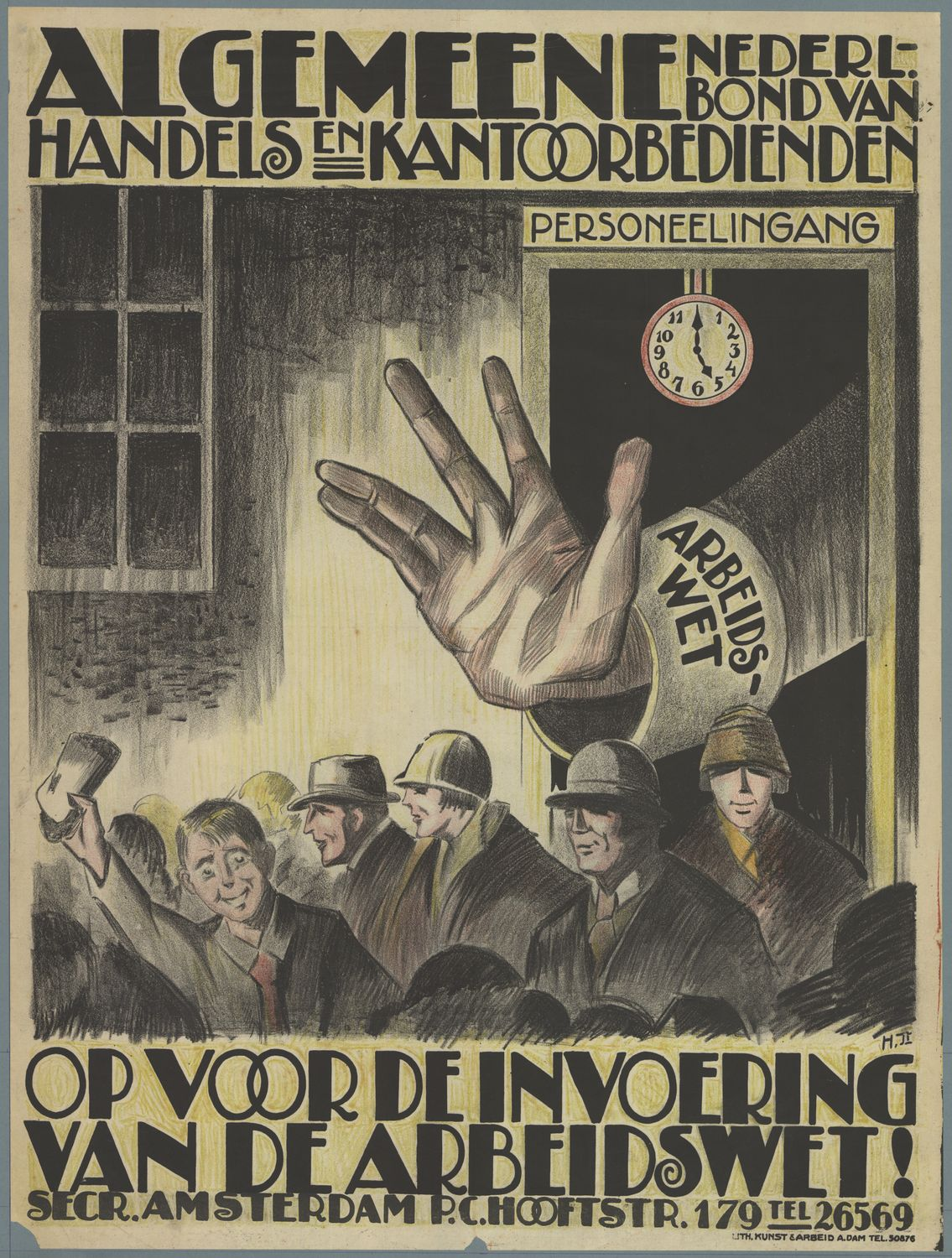
Poster designed by Albert Hahn jr.

The General Dutch Union of Trade and Office Workers (Dutch: Algemeene Nederlandsche Bond van Handels- en Kantoorbedienden, ANBHK) was a trade union representing white collar workers in the Netherlands.

The union was founded on 22 October 1905 as a split from the National Association of Trade and Office Clerks, led by supporters of the Social Democratic Workers' Party. On 1 January 1906, it was a founding affiliate of the Dutch Confederation of Trade Unions (NVV). While it initially had only 213 members, it grew steadily; by 1914 had 1,531 members, and by 1921, 4,932 members. Unlike its rival trade unions, it welcomed women into membership, and they soon comprised about 20% of its total.

The union organised a number of strikes. The first was in 1910, at J. Norden, a wholesaler in Rotterdam, and within a week the company agreed to start paying for overtime. In 1926, it led a seven-month strike at Electrolux, which led to recognition of the union and an agreed wage scheme.

The National Association became part of the union Mercurius, which repeatedly discussed a potential merger with the General union. On 1 October 1940, the occupying Nazis forced a merger of the two, and after World War II, they agreed to maintain the unity, as the General Dutch Association for Trade and Office Clerks and Travelling Salesmen.

== Leaders ==
The union was led by its secretary until 1921, and thereafter by its president.

1905: Edo Fimmen
1916: Gerrit Smit
1934: W. Brouwer
