= Central Union of Commercial Employees =

Former German Empire trade union (1897–1919)

The Central Union of Commercial Employees (German: Zentralverband der Handlungsgehilfen, ZdH) was a trade union representing white collar commercial workers in Germany.

The union was founded on the 5 July 1897, and launched the journal Handlungsgehilfenblatt. It affiliated to the General Commission of German Trade Unions. Initially, it had just 253 members, and by 1904 this had only risen to 1,386. In 1912, the union moved its headquarters to Berlin. On 1 January 1913, the Union of Warehouse Workers merged in.

The union became divided between anti- and pro-World War I tendencies, with president Otto Urban trying to maintain a middle course. The end of the war led to a boom in membership, which by 1918 had reached 66,228. In 1919, it was a founding constituent of the General German Trade Union Federation, but in October, it merged with the Union of Office Employees of Germany, to form the Central Union of Employees.

== Presidents ==
1897: Gustav Segnitz
1902: Max Josephson
1912: Otto Urban
