= Gary Nebeker =

American trade union leader

Gary Raleigh Nebeker (September 12, 1942 – November 18, 2020) was an American trade union leader.

Born in Berkeley, California, Nebeker began working full-time for the Retail Clerks International Union in the 1960s. In the late 1970s, he became assistant director of the union's international affairs department, then was appointed as director in 1984 of what had become the United Food and Commercial Workers. In the role, he traveled worldwide, building direct links with unions. He was eventually promoted to become international vice president of the union.

Nebeker was also a leading figure in the commerce trade section of the International Federation of Commercial, Clerical, Professional and Technical Employees (FIET). In 1991, he was elected as vice president of FIET, then in 1995 as president. He took a leading role in negotiations to merge FIET with other global unions, which ultimately led to the formation of Union Network International (UNI). He also oversaw the construction of new headquarters for FIET, in Nyon. He stood down as president in 1999, shortly before the UNI was established, but remained on its executive.

Trade union offices
Preceded by Jochen Richert	President of the International Federation of Commercial, Clerical, Professional and Technical Employees; 1994–1999	Succeeded by Maj-Len Remahl
