= Bengt Lloyd =

Swedish trade union leader

Bengt Lloyd (4 March 1928 – June 2013) was a Swedish trade union leader.

Born in Malmö, Lloyd began working as a clerk at the Swedish Commercial Employees' Union (Handels), where he gradually rose to prominence. In 1953, he was given responsibility for the union's propaganda work, then soon became its education secretary. In 1959, he was put in charge of negotiations, and then in 1968, he became third president of the union. He progressed to vice president in 1974, and then in 1982 became president, a position he served in for nearly a decade. In 1987, he additionally became president of the International Federation of Commercial, Clerical, Professional and Technical Employees (FIET).

Lloyd retired from his trade union posts in 1991, becoming active in the Swedish Social Democratic Party and chair of Malmö's audit committee.

Trade union offices
Preceded by Börje Heggestad	President of the Swedish Commercial Employees' Union; 1982–1991	Succeeded by Kenth Pettersson
Preceded by Tom Whaley	President of the International Federation of Commercial, Clerical, Professional and Technical Employees; 1987–1991	Succeeded by Jochen Richert
