= Rotterdam II (electoral district) =

Rottedam II was an electoral district of the House of Representatives in the Netherlands from 1848 to 1850, and again from 1897 to 1918.

== Profile ==
Rotterdam II was created as a provisional single-member district in 1848, and included the neighbourhoods 1 and 9 through 14 in the municipality of Rotterdam. It was abolished again in 1850, when it merged with the district of Rotterdam I to form the two-member district of Rotterdam. The district was reconstituted in 1897, when Rotterdam was split into five single-member districts. This district was situated in the north of Rotterdam, corresponding with what is today part of the Noord borough.

Due to the area's urban development in the late 19th and early 20th century, Rotterdam II's electorate grew substantially during its second iteration, from 3,394 in 1897 to 17,453 to 1917.

The district of Rotterdam II was abolished upon the introduction of party-list proportional representation in 1918.

== Members ==
=== First creation ===
Abram van Rijckevorsel was elected in the district of Rotterdam II in the inaugural 1848 election. Though political parties did not exist at this time, Van Rijckevorsel is classified as a "pragmatic" liberal.

| Election | Member | Party | Ref. |
|---|---|---|---|
| 1848 | Abram van Rijckevorsel | Independent | |

=== Second creation ===
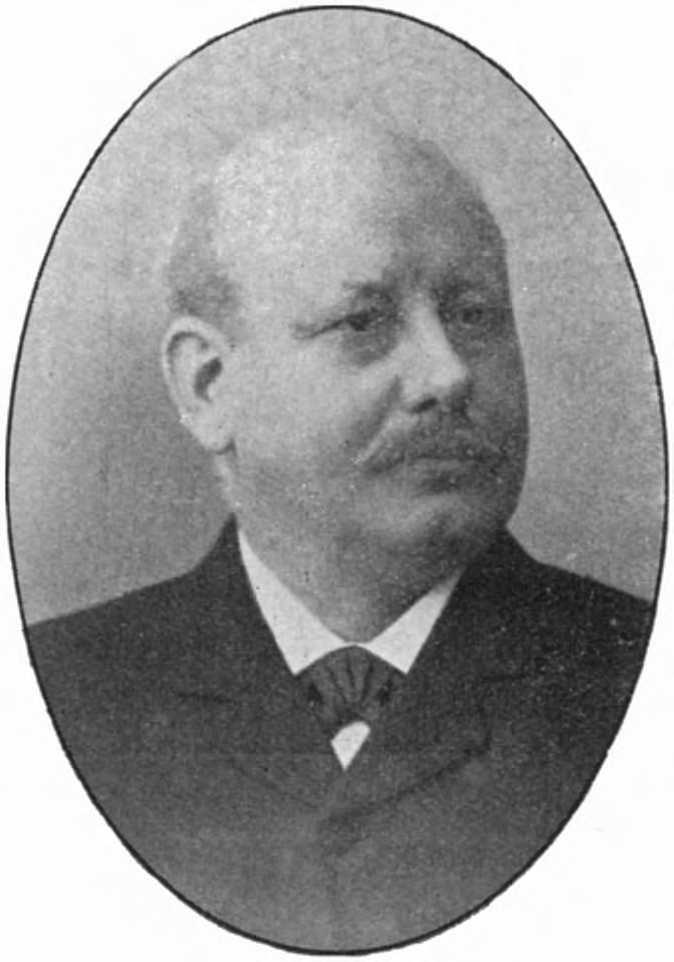
Dirk de Klerk, c. 1905

During its second iteration, Rotterdam II was consistently held, though sometimes narrowly, by the parliamentary left. The liberal Dirk de Klerk won the inaugural 1897 election, and represented the district until he was defeated by the SDAP candidate Hendrik Spiekman in 1913. Spiekman was re-elected in the June 1917 general election, but died in November of that year. Fellow social democrat Arie de Zeeuw was elected in a subsequent by-election, and represented the district until its abolition in 1918.

| Election | Member | Party | Ref. |
|---|---|---|---|
| 1897 | Dirk de Klerk | Lib | |
| 1901 | Dirk de Klerk | Lib | |
| 1905 | Dirk de Klerk | Lib | |
| 1909 | Dirk de Klerk | Lib | |
| 1913 | Hendrik Spiekman | SDAP | |
| 1917 | Hendrik Spiekman | SDAP | |
| 1917 | Arie de Zeeuw | SDAP | |

== Election results ==
=== Elections in the 1840s ===
1848 general election: Rotterdam II
| Candidate | Party | Votes | % |
|---|---|---|---|
| Abram van Rijckevorsel | Independent | 195 | 65.00 |
| Mari Aert Frederic Henri Hoffmann | Independent | 53 | 17.67 |
| Engel Pieter de Monchy | Independent | 9 | 3.00 |
| A. van Rijckevorsel | Independent | 9 | 3.00 |
| J.H.C. van der Kun | Independent | 6 | 2.00 |
| Johan Rudolph Thorbecke | Independent | 4 | 1.33 |
| Willem Theodore Gevers Deynoot | Independent | 4 | 1.33 |
| M.A.F. Hoffman | Independent | 4 | 1.33 |
| Others | | 16 | 5.33 |
| Total | | 300 | 100.00 |
| Valid votes | | 300 | 100.00 |
| Invalid/blank votes | | 0 | 0.00 |
| Total votes | | 300 | 100.00 |
| Registered voters/turnout | | 339 | 88.50 |
| Independent gain | | | |
Source: Electoral Council, Huygens Institute

=== Elections in the 1890s ===
1897 general election: Rotterdam II
| Candidate | Party | First round | | Second round | |
| Candidate | Party | Votes | % | Votes | % |
|---|---|---|---|---|---|
| Dirk de Klerk | Lib | 1,135 | 41.00 | 1,649 | 58.00 |
| Titus van Asch van Wijck | AR | 582 | 21.03 | 1,194 | 42.00 |
| Johannes Theodoor de Visser | CHK | 543 | 19.62 | | |
| Herman Schaepman | Ka | 425 | 15.35 | | |
| J.G. van Kuykhof | SDAP | 83 | 3.00 | | |
| Total | | 2,768 | 100.00 | 2,843 | 100.00 |
| Valid votes | | 2,768 | 99.35 | 2,843 | 98.61 |
| Invalid/blank votes | | 18 | 0.65 | 40 | 1.39 |
| Total votes | | 2,786 | 100.00 | 2,883 | 100.00 |
| Registered voters/turnout | | 3,394 | 82.09 | 3,394 | 84.94 |
| Liberal gain | | | | | |
Source: Electoral Council, Huygens Institute

=== Elections in the 1900s ===
1901 general election: Rotterdam II
| Candidate | Party | First round | | Second round | |
| Candidate | Party | Votes | % | Votes | % |
|---|---|---|---|---|---|
| Dirk de Klerk | Lib | 1,637 | 43.54 | 2,298 | 53.96 |
| Albertus de Jong | AR | 1,548 | 41.17 | 1,961 | 46.04 |
| Herman Verkouteren | CHK | 296 | 7.87 | | |
| J.G. van Kuykhof | SDAP | 279 | 7.42 | | |
| Total | | 3,760 | 100.00 | 4,259 | 100.00 |
| Valid votes | | 3,760 | 99.03 | 4,259 | 99.46 |
| Invalid/blank votes | | 37 | 0.97 | 23 | 0.54 |
| Total votes | | 3,797 | 100.00 | 4,282 | 100.00 |
| Registered voters/turnout | | 5,148 | 73.76 | 5,148 | 83.18 |
| Liberal hold | | | | | |
Source: Electoral Council, Huygens Institute

1905 general election: Rotterdam II
| Candidate | Party | First round | | Second round | |
| Candidate | Party | Votes | % | Votes | % |
|---|---|---|---|---|---|
| Johannes Theodoor de Visser | CHP | 3,151 | 46.12 | 3,328 | 46.50 |
| Dirk de Klerk | Lib | 3,124 | 45.73 | 3,829 | 53.50 |
| P.J. Helsdingen | SDAP | 557 | 8.15 | | |
| Total | | 6,832 | 100.00 | 7,157 | 100.00 |
| Valid votes | | 6,832 | 99.19 | 7,157 | 99.53 |
| Invalid/blank votes | | 56 | 0.81 | 34 | 0.47 |
| Total votes | | 6,888 | 100.00 | 7,191 | 100.00 |
| Registered voters/turnout | | 7,751 | 88.87 | 7,751 | 92.78 |
| Liberal hold | | | | | |
Source: Electoral Council, Huygens Institute

1909 general election: Rotterdam II
| Candidate | Party | First round | | Second round | |
| Candidate | Party | Votes | % | Votes | % |
|---|---|---|---|---|---|
| W.B. van Staveren | AR | 4,029 | 47.77 | 4,438 | 49.61 |
| Dirk de Klerk | Lib | 3,200 | 37.94 | 4,508 | 50.39 |
| Pieter Jelles Troelstra | SDAP | 1,205 | 14.29 | | |
| Total | | 8,434 | 100.00 | 8,946 | 100.00 |
| Valid votes | | 8,434 | 99.11 | 8,946 | 99.11 |
| Invalid/blank votes | | 76 | 0.89 | 80 | 0.89 |
| Total votes | | 8,510 | 100.00 | 9,026 | 100.00 |
| Registered voters/turnout | | 10,761 | 79.08 | 10,761 | 83.88 |
| Liberal hold | | | | | |
Source: Electoral Council, Huygens Institute

=== Elections in the 1910s ===
1913 general election: Rotterdam II
| Candidate | Party | First round | | Second round | |
| Candidate | Party | Votes | % | Votes | % |
|---|---|---|---|---|---|
| W.B. van Staveren | AR | 4,431 | 39.65 | 5,322 | 46.48 |
| Hendrik Spiekman | SDAP | 3,395 | 30.38 | 6,129 | 53.52 |
| Dirk de Klerk | Lib | 3,349 | 29.97 | | |
| Total | | 11,175 | 100.00 | 11,451 | 100.00 |
| Valid votes | | 11,175 | 98.96 | 11,451 | 98.81 |
| Invalid/blank votes | | 117 | 1.04 | 138 | 1.19 |
| Total votes | | 11,292 | 100.00 | 11,589 | 100.00 |
| Registered voters/turnout | | 13,625 | 82.88 | 13,625 | 85.06 |
| Social Democratic Workers' Party gain | | | | | |
Source: Electoral Council, Huygens Institute

1917 general election: Rotterdam II
| Candidate | Party | Votes | % |
|---|---|---|---|
| Hendrik Spiekman | SDAP | 3,943 | 80.39 |
| J. Roeper Bosch | AG | 496 | 10.11 |
| Willem van Ravesteyn | SDP | 466 | 9.50 |
| Total | | 4,905 | 100.00 |
| Valid votes | | 4,905 | 96.06 |
| Invalid/blank votes | | 201 | 3.94 |
| Total votes | | 5,106 | 100.00 |
| Registered voters/turnout | | 17,453 | 29.26 |
| Social Democratic Workers' Party hold | | | |
Source: Electoral Council, Huygens Institute

1917 Rotterdam II by-election
| Candidate | Party | First round | | Second round | |
| Candidate | Party | Votes | % | Votes | % |
|---|---|---|---|---|---|
| Arie de Zeeuw | SDAP | 3,628 | 39.20 | 4,844 | 50.92 |
| Jan Schouten | AR | 3,441 | 37.18 | 4,669 | 49.08 |
| Dirk de Klerk | Lib | 2,035 | 21.99 | | |
| Willem van Ravesteyn | SDP | 150 | 1.62 | | |
| Total | | 9,254 | 100.00 | 9,513 | 100.00 |
| Valid votes | | 9,254 | 98.71 | 9,513 | 99.19 |
| Invalid/blank votes | | 121 | 1.29 | 78 | 0.81 |
| Total votes | | 9,375 | 100.00 | 9,591 | 100.00 |
| Registered voters/turnout | | 17,453 | 53.72 | 17,453 | 54.95 |
| Social Democratic Workers' Party hold | | | | | |
Source: Electoral Council, Huygens Institute
