= Union of Office Employees of Germany =

The Union of Office Employees of Germany (German: Verbandes der Bureauangestellten Deutschlands) was a trade union representing office workers in Germany.

The union was founded in 1895 as the Central Union of Office Employees in Germany, on the initiative of the Free Union of Office Employees in Berlin and the Surrounding Area. The union affiliated to the General Commission of German Trade Unions, but struggled to grow. On founding, it had 200 members, and by 1904, this had only risen to 703.

In 1908, the union absorbed the larger Union of Health Insurance Administrative Officers, and on the initiative of new leader Karl Giebel, it also set up a pension fund. It thereafter grew rapidly, reaching 5,783 members by 1910, and 27,804 by 1918. In 1919, it was a founding affiliate of the General German Trade Union Federation, but in October, it merged with the Central Union of Commercial Employees, to form the Central Union of Employees.

== Presidents ==
1895: Gustav Bauer
1908: Karl Giebel
