= General Federation of Free Employees =

German Socialist trade union federation

The General Federation of Free Employees (German: Allgemeiner freier Angestelltenbund, AfA-Bund) was an amalgamation of various socialist-oriented trade unions of technical and administrative employees in the Weimar Republic. It was one of the founding members of the Iron Front on 16 December, 1931.

Member organizations encompassed groups as diverse as artists, theater workers, bank clerks, foremen, and technical employees and managers. It was founded in 1920 and was dissolved in on March 30, 1933, just before the newly empowered Nazi regime began crushing the Free Trade Unions. Throughout its existence, it was led by Siegfried Aufhäuser.

== Affiliates ==
The following unions were affiliated to the federation:

- Central Union of Employees (ZdA)
- German Workers' Union (DWV)
- Union of Technical Staff and Officials (Butab)
- Polishing, Works and Shaft Masters' Unions
- General Association of German Bank Employees
- Co-operative of German Stage Members
- International Artists' Lodge (IAL)
- Union of German Ship Engineers
- Master Craftsmen's Association of the Shoe Industry
- German Choir and Dancers' Union
- German Union of Carriers
- Union of cutters, directors
- Union of German Captains and Helmsmen of Merchant Shipping and Deep Sea Fishing
- AfA Association of Polish Upper Silesia
