= International Federation of Commercial, Clerical, Professional and Technical Employees =

Former global union federation (1921–1999)

- Fédération internationale des employés, techniciens et cadres
- Predecessor: International Commercial Employees' Secretariat
- Merged into: Union Network International
- Founded: 10 August 1921
- Dissolved: 31 December 1999
- Headquarters: Geneva, Switzerland
- Members: 11 million (1994)
- Publication: FIET Info
- Affiliations: ICFTU
- Website: fiet.org

The International Federation of Commercial, Clerical, Professional and Technical Employees (FIET; French: Fédération internationale des employés, techniciens et cadres) was a global union federation bringing together workers representing clerical workers. The union was sometimes known as the International Federation of Employees, Technicians and Managers, or informally as the International Federation of White Collar Workers' Unions.

== History ==
The first attempt to create an international federation of clerical workers was the International Commercial Employees' Secretariat, founded in Hamburg in 1909, and led by Edo Fimmen. It collapsed at the start of World War I. FIET was founded in 1921, in Vienna, as its replacement.

Initially representing only European unions, after World War II the federation began admitting unions from around the world. The large majority of workers represented worked in banking, insurance, or as clerical staff in commerce and social services. In 1984, the International Secretariat of Entertainment Trade Unions became an autonomous section of the FIET.

By 1994, membership of FIET had reached 11 million. At the end of 1999, it merged with the Communications International, the International Graphical Federation, and the Media and Entertainment International, to form Union Network International.

== Leadership ==
=== General Secretaries ===
1904: Max Josephson
1910: Edo Fimmen
1921: Gerrit Smit
1934: Willem Spiekman
1958: Erich Kissel
1973: Heribert Maier
1989: Philip Jennings

=== Presidents ===
1921: Otto Urban
1933: Joseph Hallsworth
1947: Oreste Capocci
1949: James Young
1955: Friedrich Hillegeist
1960: Algot Jonsson
1962: Joe Hiscock
1964: James Suffridge
1970: Alfred Allen
1976: Günter Stephan
1983: Tom Whaley
1987: Bengt Lloyd
1991: Jochen Richert
1994: Gary Nebeker
1999: Maj-Len Remahl
