= Van Zuylen van Nijevelt cabinet =

Cabinet of the Netherlands, 1866 to 1868

- Cabinet of the Netherlands
- Date formed: 1 June 1866
- Date dissolved: 4 June 1868 (Demissionary from 28 April 1866)

People and organisations
- Head of state: King William III
- Head of government: Jules van Zuylen van Nijevelt
- Deputy head of government: Jan Heemskerk (Unofficially)
- No. of ministers: 7
- Ministers removed: 3
- Total no. of members: 10
- Member party: Independent Conservatives (Ind. Con.)
- Status in legislature: Right-wing Minority government

History
- Election: 1866 election
- Outgoing election: 1868 election
- Predecessor: Fransen van de Putte cabinet
- Successor: Van Bosse–Fock cabinet

The Van Zuylen van Nijevelt cabinet was the cabinet of the Netherlands from 1 June 1866 until 4 June 1868. The cabinet was formed by Independent Conservatives (Ind. Con.) after the election of 1866. The right-wing cabinet was a minority government in the House of Representatives. Independent Liberal Conservative Jules van Zuylen van Nijevelt was Prime Minister.

== Cabinet members ==
Cabinet members
Portrait	Name	Office	Begin	End	Party
Jules van Zuylen van Nijevelt	Julius van Zuylen van Nijevelt	Chairman of the Council of Ministers; Minister of Foreign Affairs	1 June 1866	4 June 1868	Independent (Conservative)
Jan Heemskerk	Jan Heemskerk	Minister of the Interior	1 June 1866	4 June 1868	Independent (Conservative)
	Rutger Schimmelpenninck van Nijenhuis	Minister of Finance	1 June 1866	4 June 1868	Independent (Conservative)
	Eduard Borret (1816–1867)	Minister of Justice	1 June 1866	10 November 1867 (Note: Died in office)	Independent (Conservative Catholic)
Jan Heemskerk	Jan Heemskerk	Minister of Justice	10 November 1867	4 January 1868 (Note: Served ad interim)	Independent (Conservative)
	Willem Wintgens	Minister of Justice	4 January 1868	4 June 1868	Independent (Conservative Liberal)
	Johan van den Bosch	Minister of War	1 June 1866	4 June 1868	Independent (Technocrat)
Pels Rijcken	Pels Rijcken	Minister of the Navy	1 June 1866	4 June 1868	Independent (Conservative)
Pieter Mijer	Pieter Mijer	Minister of Colonial Affairs	1 June 1866	17 September 1866 (Note: Resigned)	Independent (Conservative)
	Nicolaas Trakranen	Minister of Colonial Affairs	17 September 1866	20 July 1867 (Note: Resigned)	Independent (Conservative)
Johannes Hasselman	Johannes Hasselman	Minister of Colonial Affairs	20 July 1867	4 June 1868	Independent (Conservative)
