= Gerardus Petrus Booms =

Dutch military leader, author, and politician

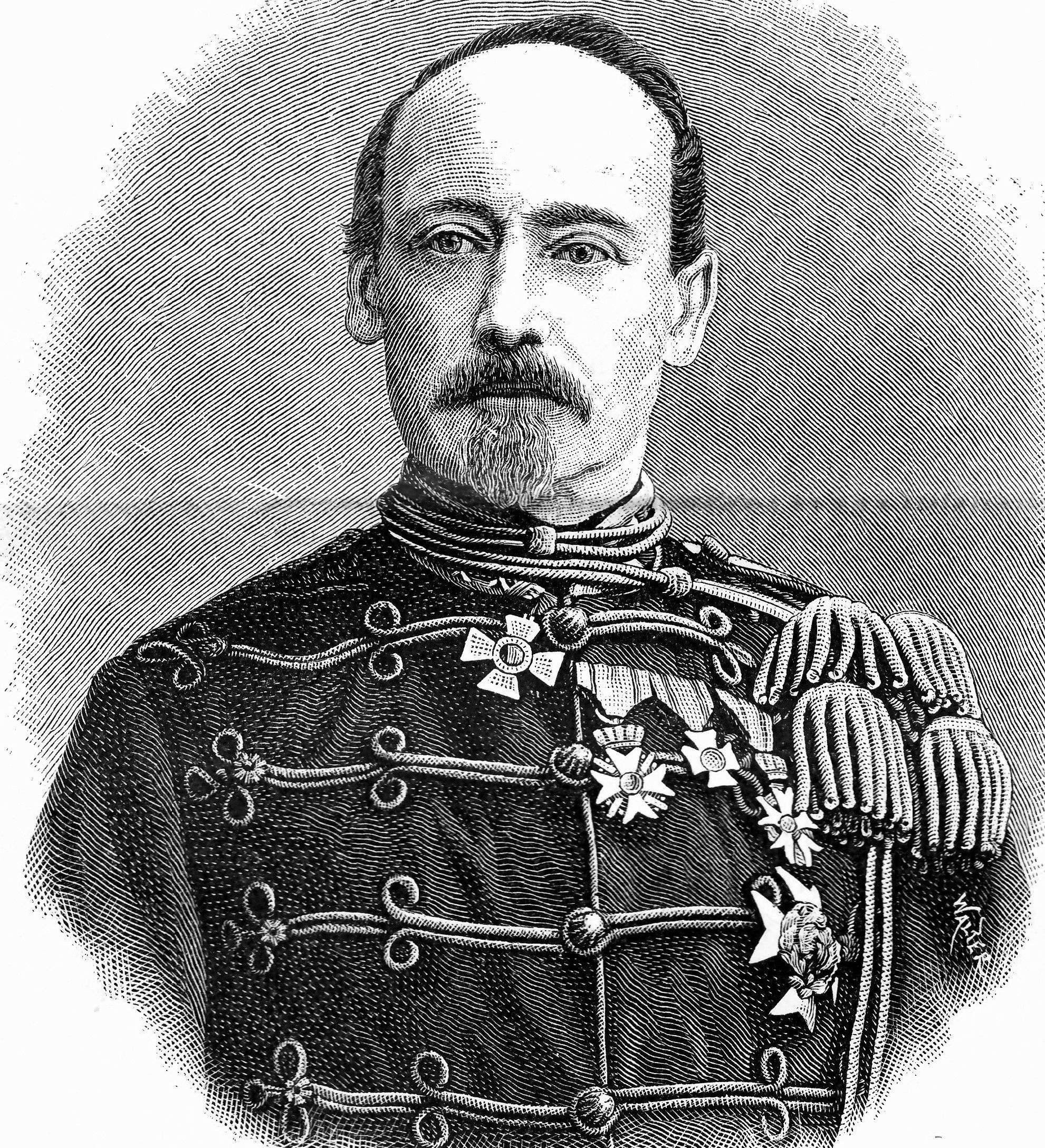
- Gerardus Petrus Booms.
- Born: 29 October 1822; Maastricht
- Died: 23 February 1897 (aged 74); The Hague
- Military career
- Allegiance: Netherlands
- Rank: General
- Other work: Politician

Gerardus Petrus Booms (29 October 1822 in Maastricht – 23 February 1897 in The Hague) was a Dutch military leader, author, and politician.

== Life ==
Boom's father and his brothers served under Napoleon; the father took part in the French occupation of Naarden in the years 1813 and 1814, from where he traveled to France until the moment had come when he could return to his homeland without blemish for his name and breach of his fidelity. Booms was not originally intended for military service, but received a classical education after leaving primary school. Because the city of Maastricht at that time in connection with the Belgian Revolution was rather restless, his parents sent him to a French (his mother was French) boarding school. In 1838 he was posted as a cadet to the Royal Military Academy; no fewer than 74 aspirants competed for 18 places, of which Booms obtained one after an entrance exam. The Military Academy was then only two years old and was placed under the administration of HG Seelig as governor and IP Delprat as commander. Booms wrote about life at the Academy later: the rules of military discipline were indeed taught, but only in letter, the spirit thereof remained foreign to the cadets. The vocation for the military rank, the whole field of military morality was left fallow. During this time, Booms read a lot in Walter Scott. He left the Academy in 1842 in the rank of second lieutenant and was posted to the seventh infantry regiment garrisoned at Maastricht.

Booms went on to serve in the military for four years and soon attracted attention for his abilities. In the summer of 1846 he was posted as a teacher of French language and literature at the Military Academy; here he got to know Van Heusden, Knoop and Seelig better. He was influenced by them and became a follower of the teaching that only sound politics could form the soil in which the military could take root and flourish. [2] During this time he acted, among other things, to ensure the legal status of the officer; this battle brought him into contact with the former soldier TJ Stieltjes and with Johan Rudolph Thorbecke. Later the outcome of this experience was the Act of 1851 regulating the promotion, dismissal and retirement of officers. Booms had meanwhile become convinced that the true military school for the officer was war: Book and field study and peace exercises, however instructive, are not sufficient preparation for war and I wanted to gain war experience, he wrote. [2] Initially Booms wanted to leave for the Indies, but because things were not so easy at the time, he left for France.

=== Activities in Algiers ===
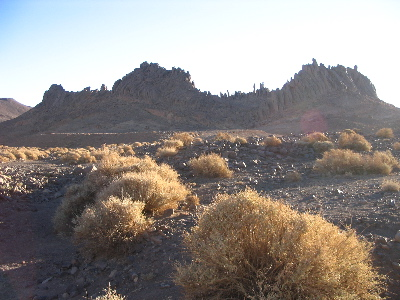
Booms took part in a French expedition to Algiers in 1851

General Seelig applauded Booms' intention and obtained a year's leave for him to France with salary. Seelig gave Booms an edition of Montaignes Essais with a handwritten caption. When he arrived at Paris, Louis Philippe I had just fallen and with him the bourgeoisie; it was fermenting all over France. Booms soon gained access to the barracks and the forts, to the military school at Saint-Cyr, some regimental schools, the autumn exercises and the library of the Ministry of War. During this time he wrote several articles for de Spectateur Militaire, including a description of the organization of the French army. In the spring of 1854 an expedition to Little Kabylie was approaching. This highland was a source of unrest for the French and it was also apparent from the events of 1848-1850 that Algiers was far from being subdued after Abd-el-kader had laid down their arms. This expedition to Little Kabylie was one of the most difficult and violent of any expedition ever to take place in Algiers. Through the mediation of the Dutch envoy general baron Fagel, who took a great deal of interest in Booms, he received permission to participate in the expedition. That expedition had a decisive influence on him. On his way to Algiers he came into contact with (then lieutenant colonel) Espinaise and got to know, among others, the generals Saint-Arnaud and Pélissier, rich in war experience.

Booms later wrote: 'War is the true touchstone for the usefulness of the army, it is also the true touchstone for the individual, especially for the officer, the exam, in which not only knowledge but also character, moral qualities, the main thing, it turns out. Under the tension of the moment, the good and bad qualities come out sharply. One has to expose oneself there as one is and one gets to know others and ... oneself. Years later, Marshal Bosquet spoke of Booms: de ce brave officer, qui nous a fait tant de bons services. On his return to France he was honorably mentioned. In Algiers, Booms was instructed by his battalion's commander to notify two army departments that were on the battalion's flank, but were too far away from it, of a change in the direction of the march. He made his way there on horseback, but soon found that the most distant division was engaged in a fierce battle. Thereupon he gave the order not to go back to the department he met first, but to go forward. He made the storm march sound, and the enemy recoiled from it; thus he managed to relieve the other division. Even before Booms returned to Paris, he was appointed Knight in the Legion of Honor. Secretary of War, General Randon, personally attached the Knight's Cross to his chest.

== Career back in the Netherlands ==
Back in the Netherlands Booms did not return to the Military Academy but was assigned to the seventh infantry regiment. In his spare time he read a lot about martial history and writers such as Ambert and wrote, among other things, while the sword must rest in the sheath seize the officer at every opportunity to distinguish himself in areas other than military as well and to serve his country with word and pen. He was promoted by choice in 1856 to Captain in the Sixth Infantry Regiment. Initially entrusted with the command of a company in the sixth regiment, he therefore came under the command of an old master, Colonel van Mulken, who was soon succeeded by Knoop. Booms then became his adjutant. In 1863 he was promoted to major in the fourth regiment and was attached to General Hendrik Frederik Karel Duycker, as chief officer attached to the inspector of infantry. In 1866 Booms took a seat on a state commission to reform military education and in 1867 he was appointed lieutenant colonel in the fourth regiment. When the regimental commander died, Booms was given command of the corps on New Year's Day 1867, only being definitively appointed commander in 1869, simultaneously with his promotion to colonel.

=== Minister of War ===
After Prime Minister Julius van Zuylen van Nijevelt resigned in 1868, Thorbecke was consulted by the William III of the Netherlands in forming a new cabinet. With the cooperation of Thorbecke, the Van Bosse–Fock cabinet was then established, in which General Van Mulken finally acted as Minister of War. Booms had set the following conditions: abolition of the deputy and an increase of the militia contingent by 3,000 men; because these conditions were not met, Booms stayed in Leiden, where he was promoted the following year to chief of the general staff. During this time, the significance of living armed forces became more prominent. Booms accepted his position in April 1870, where nothing was in order (no staff office nor a staff archive) and there were even no topographic maps available. At that time also the Franco-Prussian War broke out and nothing was prepared to maintain the neutrality. The 1865 batch had just been passported, and the remaining portion of the 1869 batch had left on great leave. The batch of 1870 had just been under arms for two months. After this tense period, the Minister of War requested Van Mulken to resign and Booms was repeatedly asked to replace him. The latter, however, expressed his thanks, but did indicate to Fock the principles which, in his opinion, should be at the forefront in the legal organization of the living and dead armed forces: a concentrated defense system, abolition of substitution, expansion of the militia, reduction of the military service, provision in the state of preparation for war and loan for the completion of the Fortification.

On 1 January 1871 Booms came into personal contact with Thorbecke for the first time, who had taken on the formation of the (Third Thorbeck cabinet). Thorbecke immediately united with Booms' two main conditions, namely the abolition of substitution and expansion of the militia. When Booms pointed out his precarious health, Thorbecke spoke of the moral obligation and promised a leave of absence. When Booms again went to Thorbecke on 3 January to request that he release him from his promise, Booms replied: It is already too late, the appointment has already been published in the Government Gazette. When Booms went from the Palace of Justice to the War Department, he was so ill that General Van Mulken of his own accord proposed to postpone the surrender of duty until the next day. Due to all kinds of complications, Booms realized that Thorbecke was not serious about defense and he then informed him of his intention to resign, saying that he did not expect any outcome from this work and that rest was indispensable for his constitution. Thorbecke considered giving Booms a six-month leave, saying: a minister is worth more, but Booms stuck to his decision. On 26 January he was honorably discharged with effect from 28 January and was reinstated to his post of Chief of the General Staff, subject to six months' leave. At the opening of the session in September 1871 it already appeared that the king's speech was no longer nearly as warlike as Thorbecke's introduction in February. The military issue was quietly announced and Thorbecke's rifle was moved from the armory to the armory.

== Selection of Booms' articles ==
- 1850. Een Frans werk over de Balische oorlogen van 1846-'49 (Breda)
- Vertalingen in het Frans van een paar krijgskundige geschriften van generaal Knoop
- 1851, 1852. Artikelen in de Spectateur militaire, in De Nieuwe Spectator, De Gids, De Indische Gids, enz.
- 1852. Veldtocht van het Fransch-Afrikaansche leger tegen Klein-Kabylië in de eerste helft van 1851 ('s-Hertogenbosch)
- 1852 Militaire statistiek en organisatie van Frankrijk (Nijm.)
- 1867. Oostenr. en Zuid-Duitschland in den oorlog van 1866 tegen Pruisen (Krijgsk. schets, Schiedam)
- 1875. Een weerlegging in het Frans van het werk van de Belgische generaal Eenens over de Belgische Opstand (Den Haag)
- 1878. Kissingen, eene episode uit den oorlog van 1866 in Duitschland (Schiedam, 1870)
- 1878. Een maarschalk van het tweede Keizerrijk en eene Fransche kolonie, studiën over Algerije ('s-Gravenh.)
- 1881. De eerste Atjehsche expeditie en hare enquête, historische kritiek (Amst.)
- 1881. Een slotwoord over de eerste Atjehsche expeditie (Amst.)
- 1884. In memoriam. Een niet uitgesproken rede bij het graf van generaal Hendrik Frederik Karel Duycker. Militaire Spectator. Pages 450-455.
- 1887. Het eerste boek van Neerlands krijgsgeschiedenis, de Batavieren, Caninefaten en Friezen onder en tegen Rome ('s-Gravenh.).
- 1892. Generaal Booms. Eigen Haard. Pages 435-438, episode 28. Download link dit artikel as ePub in the collection of the Atlas Van Stolk.
- 1897. J.T.T.C. van Dam van Isselt. G.P. Booms overleden. Militaire Spectator. Pages 363-395.

Political offices
Preceded by J.J. van Mulken	Ministers of War; 1871	Succeeded by A. Engelvaart
