= Van Bosse–Fock cabinet =

Cabinet of the Netherlands, 1868 to 1871

- Cabinet of the Netherlands
- Date formed: 4 June 1868
- Date dissolved: 4 January 1871 (Demissionary from 5 December 1870)

People and organisations
- Head of state: King William III
- Head of government: Pieter Philip van Bosse
- Deputy head of government: Cornelis Fock (Unofficially)
- No. of ministers: 7
- Ministers removed: 2
- Total no. of members: 7
- Member party: Independent Liberals (Ind. Lib.)
- Status in legislature: Centre-right Minority government

History
- Election: 1868 election
- Predecessor: Van Zuylen van Nijevelt cabinet
- Successor: Third Thorbecke cabinet

The Van Bosse–Fock cabinet was the cabinet of the Netherlands from 4 June 1868 until 4 January 1871. The cabinet was formed by Independent Liberals (Ind. Lib.). The Centre-right cabinet was a minority government in the House of Representatives. Independent Liberal Pieter Philip van Bosse was Prime Minister.

== Cabinet members ==
Cabinet members
Portrait	Name	Office	Begin	End	Party
Pieter Philip van Bosse	Pieter Philip van Bosse	Chairman of the Council of Minister; Minister of Finance	4 June 1868	4 January 1871	Independent (Liberal)
Cornelis Fock	Cornelis Fock	Minister of the Interior	4 June 1868	4 January 1871	Independent (Liberal)
Joannes Josephus van Mulken	Joannes Josephus van Mulken	Minister of Foreign Affairs	4 June 1868	8 June 1868 (Note: Served Ad interim)	Independent (Liberal)
	Theodorus Marinus; Roest van Limburg	Minister of Foreign Affairs	8 June 1868	12 December 1870 (Note: Resigned)	Independent (Liberal)
Joannes Josephus van Mulken	Joannes Josephus van Mulken	Minister of Foreign Affairs	12 December 1870	4 January 1871 (Note: Served Ad interim)	Independent (Liberal)
	Franciscus van Lilaar	Minister of Justice	4 June 1868	4 January 1871	Independent (Liberal)
Joannes Josephus van Mulken	Joannes Josephus van Mulken	Minister of War	4 June 1868	8 June 1868 (Note: Served Ad interim)	Independent (Liberal)
	Lodewijk Gerard Brocx	Minister of the Navy	4 June 1868	18 December 1873	Independent (Liberal)
	Engelbertus de Waal	Minister of Colonial Affairs	4 June 1868	16 November 1870 (Note: Resigned)	Independent (Liberal)
	Lodewijk Gerard Brocx	Minister of Colonial Affairs	16 November 1870	4 January 1871 (Note: Served Ad interim)	Independent (Liberal)
