= 1860 Dutch general election =

Partial general elections were held in the Netherlands on 12 and 26 June 1860 to elect 36 of the 72 seats in the House of Representatives.

== Electoral system ==
Of the 72 seats in the House of Representatives, 9 were elected in single-member constituencies using the two-round system.

The other 63 were elected using two-round plurality block voting in 29 constituencies from 2 to 6 seats. To be elected in the first round, a candidate had to reach an electoral threshold of 50% of the number of valid votes cast, divided by the number of seats up for election in the district.

== Results ==
| Party | Votes | % | Seats |
|---|---|---|---|
| Liberals | | | 40 |
| Conservatives | | | 18 |
| Conservative Liberals | | | 10 |
| Anti-Revolutionaries | | | 4 |
| Total | | | 72 |
| Total votes | 35,296 | – | |
| Registered voters/turnout | 85,228 | 41.41 | |
Source: Bromley & Kossman, Nohlen & Stöver

=== By district ===
| District | Members elected | Group | Ref. |
|---|---|---|---|
| Alkmaar | Cornelis van Foreest (Note: Incumbent.) | Conservative | |
| Almelo | Wolter Robert van Hoëvell | Thorbeckian liberal | |
| Amersfoort | Jan Karel van Goltstein | Conservative | |
| Amsterdam | Simon Cool | Liberal | |
| Amsterdam | Jan Heemskerk | Pragmatic liberal | |
| Amsterdam | Cornelis van Heukelom | Pragmatic liberal | |
| Appingedam | Rembertus Westerhoff | Thorbeckian liberal | |
| Arnhem | Willem van Lynden | Anti-revolutionary | |
| Assen | Louis van Heiden Reinestein | Conservative | |
| Boxmeer | Hyacinthus Kerstens | Pragmatic liberal | |
| Breda | Cornelis Wilhelmus Oomen | Pragmatic liberal | |
| Delft | Cornelis Hoekwater | Conservative | |
| Den Bosch | Johannes de Poorter | Thorbeckian liberal | |
| Den Haag | Willem Theodore Gevers Deynoot | Thorbeckian liberal | |
| Deventer | Johan Rudolph Thorbecke | Thorbeckian liberal | |
| Dokkum | Marten Kingma | Pragmatic liberal | |
| Dordrecht | Pieter Blussé van Oud-Alblas | Thorbeckian liberal | |
| Eindhoven | Johannes Baptista Bots | Thorbeckian liberal | |
| Goes | Bernard van Diggelen | Pragmatic liberal | |
| Gorinchem | Pieter Jacob Elout van Soeterwoude | Anti-revolutionary | |
| Gouda | Willem Maurits de Brauw | Conservative | |
| Groningen | Berend Wichers | Thorbeckian liberal | |
| Hoorn | Peter Marius Tutein Nolthenius | Conservative | |
| Leeuwarden | Jacob Dirks | Conservative | |
| Leiden | Rutger Jan Schimmelpenninck | Conservative | |
| Maastricht | Edmond van Wintershoven | Thorbeckian liberal | |
| Middelburg | Daniël van Eck | Thorbeckian liberal | |
| Nijmegen | Gustaaf Dommer van Poldersveldt | Conservative (Catholic) | |
| Roermond | Martin Pascal Hubert Strens | Pragmatic liberal | |
| Rotterdam | Nicolaas Olivier | Thorbeckian liberal | |
| Sneek | Schelte Wybenga | Ambiguous (Note: Noted as a conservative and a pragmatic liberal) | |
| Steenwijk | Carel Storm van 's-Gravesande | Pragmatic liberal | |
| Tilburg | Carolus Cornelius Aloysius Beens | Thorbeckian liberal | |
| Utrecht | Evert du Marchie van Voorthuysen | Conservative | |
| Zutphen | Peter van Bosse | Pragmatic liberal | |
| Zwolle | Pieter Mijer | Conservative | |
