= Maarten van der Goes van Dirxland =

Dutch politician

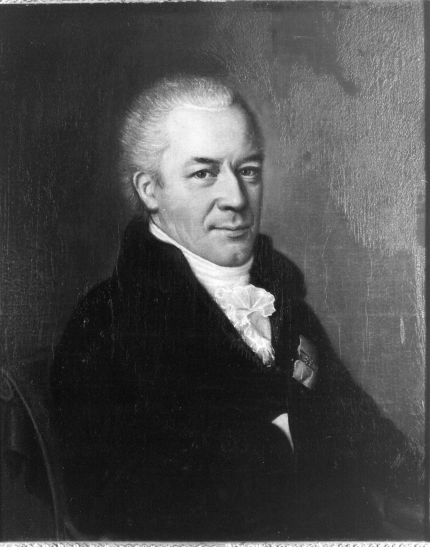
Maarten van der Goes c. 1800.

Maarten, Baron van der Goes van Dirxland (3 January 1751, The Hague – 10 July 1826, The Hague) was a Dutch politician who served as government minister. He was a moderate within the Patriots faction that came to govern the Batavian Republic. His son Louis Napoleon van der Goes van Dirxland was also active as a minister.

== Life ==
Van der Goes came from a family of regenten in The Hague and his father, Adriaan van der Goes, was the town's mayor. Maarten van der Goes entered the diplomatic service in 1785, in which he was sent to Copenhagen, then Madrid from 1793 to 1796. He was then secretary to the second national assembly of the Batavian Republic and became its foreign minister on 8 October 1798. At the end of July 1803, Van der Goes, Gerard Brantsen and Jan Bernd Bicker formed a Batavian deputation sent to Napoleon Bonaparte at Brussels, where Bonaparte was visiting the French departments in what is now Belgium. Van der Goes remained foreign minister until 19 June 1808. During May 1807, he was also the interim minister for justice and the police.

After France's annexation of Holland in 1810, Van der Goes entered the First French Empire's Corps législatif as the representative of the department of Bouches-de-la-Meuse. He was made Grand Treasurer of the Order of the Reunion on 22 February 1813 and a baron de l'Empire on 27 January 1813. Maarten van der Goes returned to the Netherlands on Napoleon's fall and became a faithful supporter of the new king William I of the Netherlands, who ennobled him in 1814 and made him a baron in 1821. Van der Goes entered the Senate on 21 September 1815, remaining in it until his death in 1826.

== Titles and decorations ==
- Grand-cross of the order of the Union, 16 February 1807
- Grand-cross and grand-trésorier of the order of the Reunion, 22 February 1812
- Officer of the Légion d'honneur, 5 January 1811
- Baron de l'Empire, 27 January 1813
- knight, 9 December 1814
- Commander of the Order of the Netherlands Lion, 1815
- baron, 3 mars 1821

Political offices
| Preceded by Willem Berend Buys | Agent for Foreign Affairs; 1798–1801 | Succeeded by Himself as Secretary of State for Foreign Affairs |
| Preceded by Himself as Agent for Foreign Affairs | Secretary of State for Foreign Affairs; 1801–1806 | Succeeded by Himself as Minister of Foreign Affairs |
| Preceded by Himself as Secretary of Statefor Foreign Affairs | Minister of Foreign Affairs; 1806–1808 | Succeeded by Willem Frederik Röell |
