= Jacob van Zuylen van Nijevelt =

Dutch politician (1816–1890)

His Excellency Jacob, Baron van Zuylen van Nijevelt
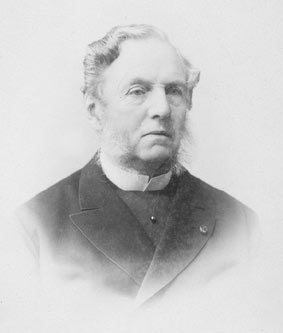

Chairman of the Council of Ministers
- In office 14 March 1861 – 10 November 1861
- Monarch: William III
- Preceded by: Floris Adriaan van Hall
- Succeeded by: Schelto van Heemstra

Personal details
- Born: Jacob Pieter Pompejus van Zuylen van Nijevelt; 29 June 1816 Dordrecht, Netherlands
- Died: 4 November 1890 (aged 74) The Hague, Netherlands
- Spouse: Emilie Rochussen
- Children: 5

Jacob Pieter Pompejus, Baron van Zuylen van Nijevelt (28 June 1816 – 4 November 1890) was a Dutch politician who served as Minister of Foreign Affairs of the Netherlands from 1852 to 1853, and again in 1861. During his second term as minister, he was also the chairman of the Council of Ministers, an office now known as Prime Minister.

Later, he was representative of the Netherlands in Paris.

House of Representatives of the Netherlands
New district	Member for Ruurlo; 1849–1850	District abolished
New title Second seat added	Member for Zutphen; 1850–1852; With: Willem Hendrik Dullert	Succeeded by Constantijn van Panhuys
Preceded by Guillaume Groen van Prinsterer	Member for Zwolle; 1854–1861; With: Bartholomeus Sloet tot Oldhuis 1854–1860; Pieter Mijer 1860–1861	Succeeded by Julius van Zuylen van Nijevelt
Preceded by Willem Theodore Gevers Deynoot	Member for The Hague; 1864–1867; With: Jan Kappeyne van de Coppello 1864–1866; François de Casembroot 1866–1867	Succeeded by Cornelis Ascanius van Sypesteyn
Political offices
Preceded by Herman van Sonsbeeck	Minister of Foreign Affairs; 1852–1853	Succeeded by Floris Adriaan van Hall
Preceded by Louis Napoleon van der Goes van Dirxland	Minister of Foreign Affairs; 1861	Succeeded by Martin Pascal Hubert Strens
Preceded by Floris Adriaan van Hall	Chairman of the Council of Ministers; 1861	Succeeded by Schelto van Heemstra
