= Pahud =

Pahud is a surname. Notable people with the surname include:

- Charles Ferdinand Pahud (1803–1873), Governor-General of the Dutch East Indies
- Charles Pahud de Mortanges (1869–1971), Dutch horse rider
- Emmanuel Pahud (born 1970), Franco-Swiss flautist
