= Louis Napoleon van der Goes van Dirxland =

Dutch politician (1806–1885)

Louis Napoleon, Baron van der Goes van Dirxland

Minister of Foreign Affairs of the Netherlands

Baron
- In office 4 April 1860 – 14 January 1861
- Monarch: William III of the Netherlands
- Premier: Floris Adriaan van Hall
- Preceded by: The Count van Zuylen van Nijevelt
- Succeeded by: Baron van der Heim van Duivendijke

Member of the Provincial Council of South Holland
- In office 9 September 1848 – 24 September 1850

Personal details
- Born: 28 July 1806 Loosduinen, Kingdom of Holland
- Died: 19 March 1885 (aged 78) The Hague, Netherlands
- Party: Conservatives
- Parent: Maarten van der Goes van Dirxland (Father)
- Education: Leiden University

Louis Napoleon, Baron van der Goes van Dirxland (28 July 1806 – 19 March 1885) was a Dutch politician and Ministers of Foreign Affairs of the Netherlands from 4 April 1860 until 14 January 1861. His father was Maarten van der Goes van Dirxland. Due to his knighthood, he also was a member of the Provincial Council of South Holland from 9 September 1848 to 24 September 1850.

Political offices
Preceded by The Count van Zuylen van Nijevelt	Minister of Foreign Affairs; 1861	Succeeded by Baron van der Heim van Duivendijke
