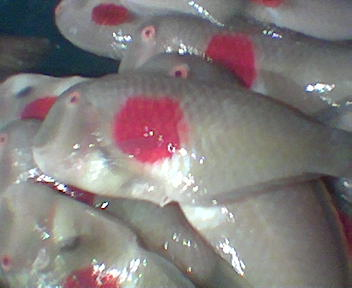

Conservation status
- Least Concern (IUCN 3.1)

Scientific classification
- Kingdom: Animalia
- Phylum: Chordata
- Class: Actinopterygii
- Order: Labriformes
- Family: Labridae
- Genus: Iniistius
- Species: I. twistii

Binomial name
- Iniistius twistii (Bleeker, 1856)

Synonyms
- Novacula twistii Bleeker, 1856; Xyrichtys twistii (Bleeker, 1856); Novacula stockumii Reuvens, 1895; Hemipteronotus nigromaculatus Herre, 1933

= Iniistius twistii =

Species of fish

Iniistius twistii, the redblotch razorfish, is a species of marine ray-finned fish from the family Labridae, the wrasses. It is found in the western Pacific Ocean.

== Description ==
This species reaches a length of 20.0 cm (7.9 in).

== Etymology ==
The fish is named in honor of Albertus Jacobus Duymaer van Twist (1809–1887), the Governor-General of the Dutch East Indies who governed for five years from 1851 to 1856.
