= Order of the Reunion =

Order of the Reunion Ordre de la Réunion
- Insignia of the Order
- Type: Order of merit
- Presented by: (France) First French Empire
- Status: Abolished in 1815
- Established: October 1811
- Ribbon of the Order

Precedence
- Next (higher): Legion d'Honneur
- Next (lower): Order of the Iron Crown

The Order of the Reunion (French: Ordre de la Réunion) was an order of merit of the First French Empire, set up to be awarded to Frenchmen and foreigners to reward services in the civil service, magistracy and army, particularly those from areas newly annexed to France, such as the Kingdom of Holland. It was established in 1811 and abolished in 1815. There were similar orders in the other states annexed by France, such as the Palatinate, Papal States, Tuscany and Piedmont, including the Order of the Lion of Bavaria, the Order of the Golden Spur, the Order of St John Lateran, the Order of Saint Stephen, the Order of the Most Holy Annunciation and the Order of Saints Maurice and Lazarus.

== History ==
Generic heraldic markers (blue band and gold star) of a Knight of the Empire with the Order of the Reunion

It was set up on 18 October 1811 by Napoleon I, on his first visit to the Paleis op de Dam in Amsterdam after his 1810 annexation of the Kingdom of Holland to France. It was set up as an order of merit to replace Louis Bonaparte's Order of the Union. It had three ranks and Napoleon himself was its Grand Master. The knights of the order were authorised to wear their old decorations until 1 April or exchange them for ones of the new order. Within the First French Empire's hierarchy of orders it was second only to the Legion of Honour, with the Order of the Iron Crown being the third in rank. Napoleon disliked the idea of a poor nobility and so assigned 500,000 francs annually to provide pensions to the order's members.

In a letter to Jean-Jacques-Régis de Cambacérès, Napoleon wrote that an order with the motto "Bien faire et laisser dire" ("Do well and let say"), the motto of the Order of the Union, was not suited to a great empire, saying "We must look for a motto which gives a sense of the advantages of the union of the Baltic, Mediterranean, Adriatic and the [Atlantic] Ocean. This great event that truly characterises the Empire, could be called the Order of the Union." Napoleon eventually occupied large territories in north-west Germany and the Illyrian provinces on the Dalmatian coast - the name of the order he founded referred to the fact that (for the first time since the Roman Empire) all access points to the sea were under the same authority.

Napoleon reserved himself the exclusive right to exclude someone from the order or nominate them to it – Napoleon felt his brother Louis had been too generous in giving out medals. The order was headed by the Frenchman Jean-Baptiste de Nompère de Champagny as Grand Chancellor and the Dutchman Maarten van der Goes van Dirxland as Grand Treasurer and they and the order had a joint base in the Hôtel du Châtelet at Paris. The knights of the Order of the Reunion had the right to bear the title "Knight" and, when they enjoyed an annual income of 3,000 francs, could also receive letters of nobility making them and their descendants Knights of the Empire. Charles-François Lebrun, duc de Plaisance and Napoleon's representative in Amsterdam as "Prins-stadhouder", oversaw the order and its membership numbers.

Louis continued to wear ‘his’ Order of the Union throughout his life and old-established nobles did not receive the Order of the Reunion. The Dutch statesmen Godert van der Capellen, Anton Reinhard Falck and Vischer did not accept the Order of the Reunion, thinking it humiliating to the Netherlands. Van Capellen noted that "the [Order's] oath was of such a nature to me that I forever refused it, with better opportunities to cooperate in restoring our independence. All the other Grand Crosses, Commanders and Knights of the Dutch Order of the Union thought the new Order was just [the Order of the Union] under a different name and signed up to it."

Knights of the new Order were appointed right up to the end of the First Empire in 1814. On their initial restoration in 1814 the Bourbons neither abolished nor awarded the Order of the Reunion and Napoleon awarded it during the Hundred Days. On 28 July 1815 Louis XVIII of France abolished it, asking its knights to return their gold and silver badges to the chancellery of the Legion d’Honneur. Those returned included few from the Netherlands since the cross was the replacement for the Order of the Union and the Dutch – having seen their country looted and drained of manpower for so long by the French – were unwilling to send their gold and silver awards back to Paris.

== Numbers ==
The target number of members for the order was at least 10,000 knights, 2,000 commanders and 500 grand cross members, though in the end it only reached 527 (59 from Holland), 90 (21 from Holland) and 64 (29 from Holland) respectively. According to a statement by Van der Goes Dirxland, 11 grand crosses, 36 commanders’ crosses and 59 knights’ crosses were handed in and melted down. The French state replaced them, though it was usually paid for by the recipient himself, honouring the awards of the Order of the Reunion. An official statement said that by its end the order had been awarded 1,622 times, with 1,364 knights, 127 commanders and 131 grand crosses. 614 of these cases involved a foreigner, that is those who were not subjects of Napoleon. Since the order began as a replacement for the Order of the Union, 681 recipients had previously borne the Order of the Union, one third to one half of whom were Dutch.

== Decorations ==
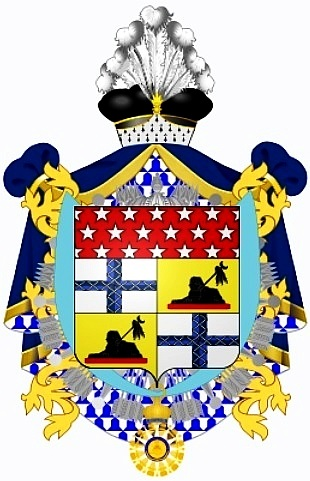
Heraldic achievement of Jean-Toussaint Arrighi de Casanova, duc de Padoue, with the insignia of Grand Cross of the Order of the Reunion

The medal of the Order of the Reunion was a gold enamelled twelve-pointed star with a ball on each point. Between each point was a bundle of golden spears. At its centre was a circle surrounded in gold and blue, encircled by a gold laurel wreath and bearing a gold ‘N’ on a gold ground. On the blue circle was written ‘A JAMAIS’ (forever).

The reverse is similar to the obverse but bears an empty throne instead of the imperial monogram. In front of the throne is the Capitoline Wolf suckling Romulus and Remus. The throne is also surrounded by symbols of the lands annexed by France – a Florentine lily, a Dutch lion with a sheaf of nine arrows (symbol of the old Dutch Republic) supporting the throne, a Piedmontese coat of arms and two tridents symbolizing the ports of Hamburg and Genoa. On the surrounding circlet is ‘TOUT POUR L’EMPIRE’ (all for the Empire). On the front the medal was suspended from a closed crown and on the back by a diadem and blue ring bearing the words ‘FONDATEUR’ (founder) and ‘NAPOLEON’. These were both attached to a moiré-effect blue ribbon. There were two models of the Grand Cross star – a star bearing an embroidered Napoleonic crowned eagle on an oval with a shield and the empty throne, and a massive sterling silver plaque in the shape of the medal.

The Second French Empire saw high demand for souvenirs from the First Empire and so new medals of the Orders of the Union and Reunion were produced. These are hard to distinguish from the originals, though the silver star is probably a mid-19th-century invention, since in 1811 the star was almost always worn in an embroidered form.
