= Paul Therèse van der Maesen de Sombreff =

Dutch politician (1827–1902)

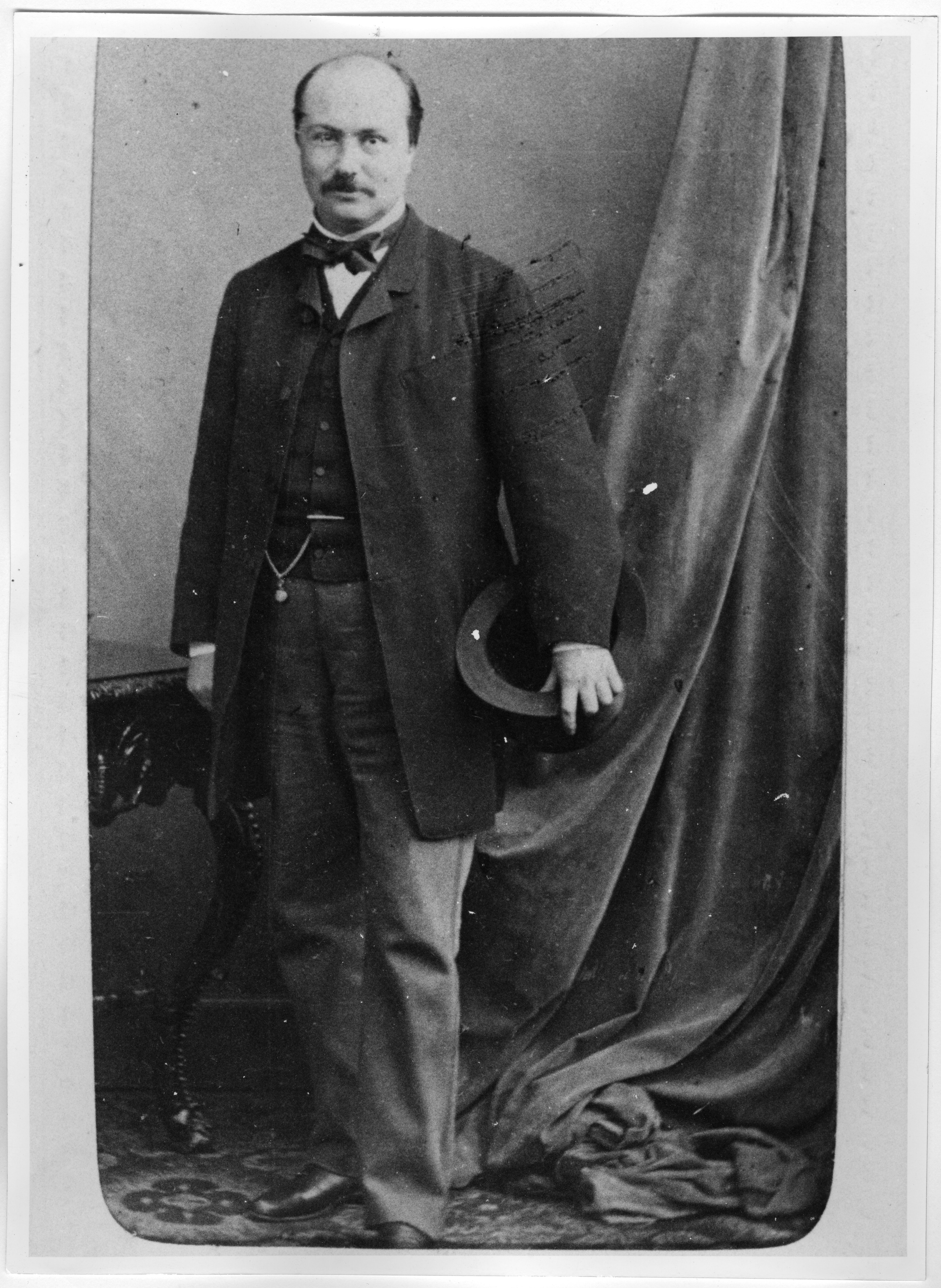
Paul Therèse van der Maesen de Sombreff

Jonkheer Paul Therèse van der Maesen de Sombreff (25 October 1827 in Maastricht – 14 November 1902, Maastricht) was a Dutch politician and Minister of Foreign Affairs of the Netherlands between 1862 and 1864.

His papers are held in the national archive of the Netherlands.
