= Albertus Jacobus Duymaer van Twist =

Dutch politician

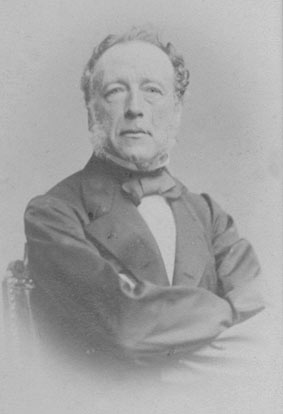
- Albertus Jacobus Duymaer van Twist in 1861

Governor-General of the Dutch East Indies
- In office 15 May 1851 – 22 May 1856
- Monarch: William III
- Preceded by: Jan Jacob Rochussen
- Succeeded by: Charles Ferdinand Pahud

Personal details
- Born: 20 February 1809 Deventer, Kingdom of Holland
- Died: 3 December 1887 (aged 78) Diepenveen, Netherlands

Albertus Jacobus Duymaer van Twist (20 February 1809 – 3 December 1887) was the Governor-General of the Dutch East Indies from 1851 to 1856.

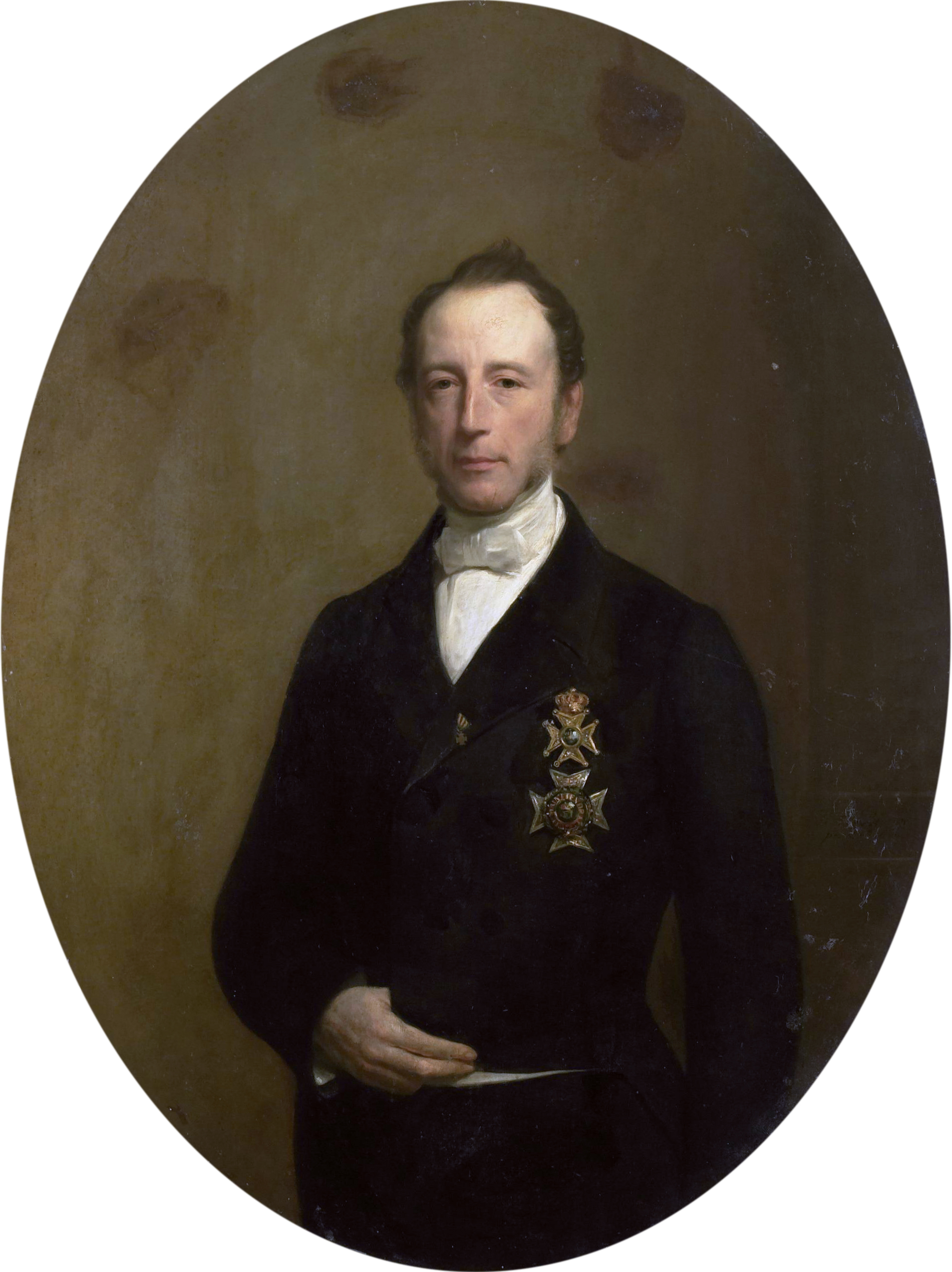
Portrait of Albertus Jacobus Duymaer van Twist in 1861

== Taxon named in his honor ==
- The fish yellow-breasted wrasse, Anampses twistii was named after him.
- Iniistius twistii, the Redblotch razorfish, is a species of marine ray-finned fish from the family Labridae, the wrasses. It is found in the Western Pacific Ocean.

Political offices
Preceded by Jan Jacob Rochussen	Governor-General of the Dutch East Indies; 1851–1856	Succeeded by Charles Ferdinand Pahud
