= Order of the Union =

Order of the Union Orde van de Unie
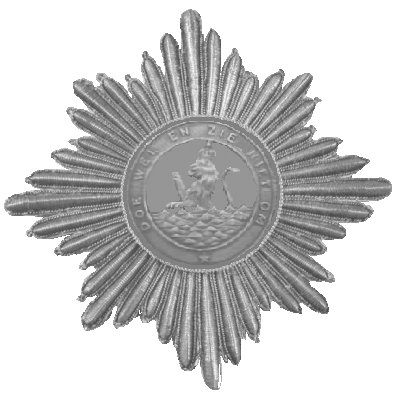
- Silver embroidered star of the order
- Type: Chivalric order
- Awarded for: Meritorious service to the kingdom
- Country: Kingdom of Holland
- Presented by: the King of Holland
- Eligibility: Civil and military
- Motto: Unity makes strength
- Status: Abolished on 18 October 1811
- Established: 1806
- Ribbon bar of the order
- Related: Order of the Reunion

The Order of the Union (Dutch: Orde van de Unie) was a chivalric order established in 1806 by Louis Bonaparte, younger brother of Napoleon I, for the Kingdom of Holland. The order was abolished in 1811 when the French Empire absorbed the Kingdom of Holland. It was succeeded by the Order of the Reunion.

== Variants ==
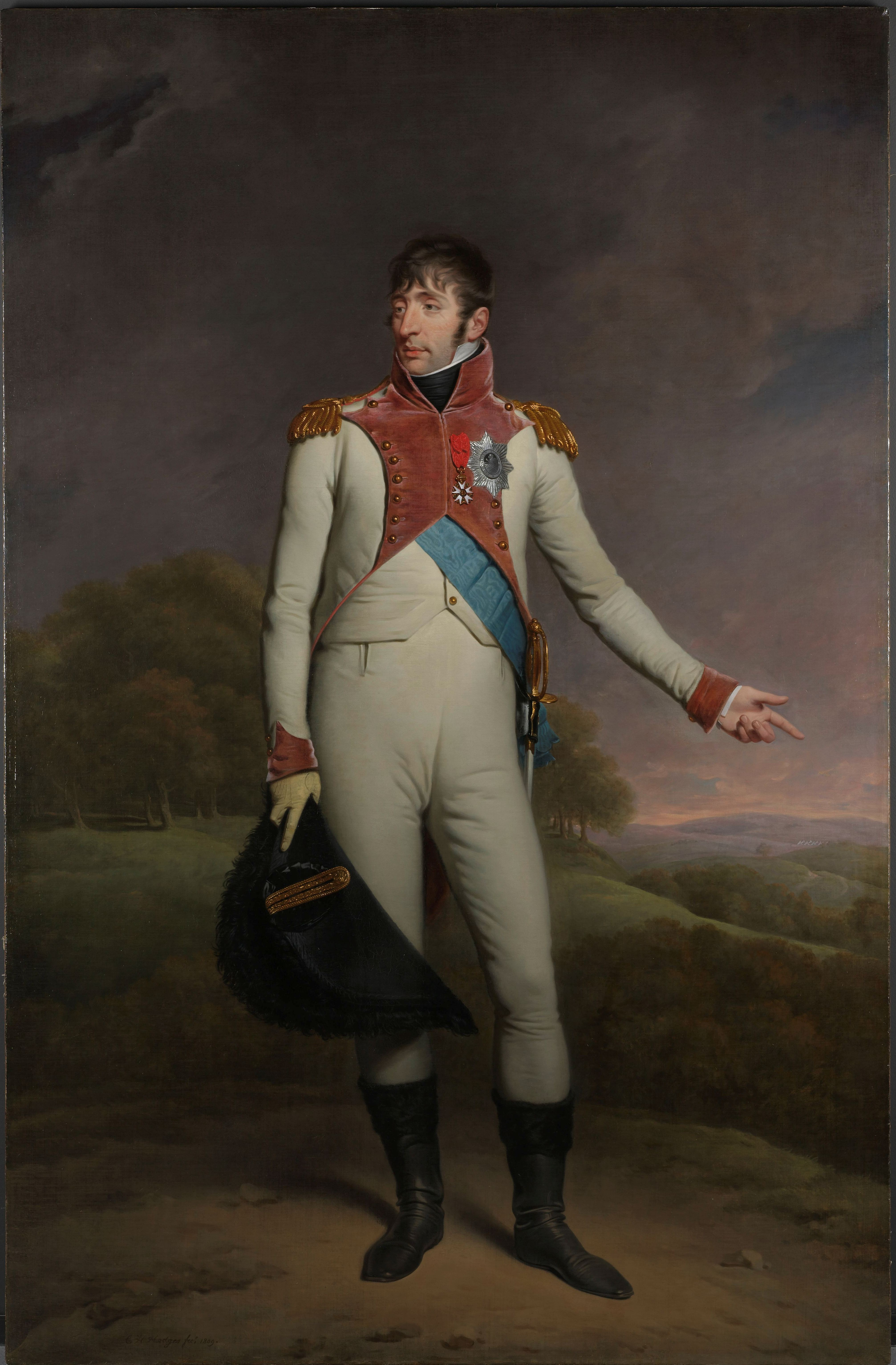
Portrait of Louis Bonaparte by Charles Howard Hodges, 1809. He is shown with star and grand sash of the order.

Louis Napoleon was highly active despite the short length of his reign and so there were six variants of the order, though these all had more or less the same form, rules and decorations and the different names were all for more or less the same order – the orders have been described by authors such as Mr. Otto Schutte, Jan Albertus van Zelm van Eldik, George Sanders, P.J. d'Artillac Brill Sr. and George Carl Emil Köffler as an organic whole. These variants were:

- Order of the Union (12 December 1806 – 13 February 1807)
- Royal Order of Merit (12 December 1806 – 13 February 1807)
- Royal Order of Holland (13 February 1807 – 23 November 1807)
- Royal Order of the Union (23 November 1807 – 6 February 1808)
- Royal Order of the Union of Holland (so-named in the decree of 6 February 1808)
- Royal Order of the Union (6 February 1808 – 1 April 1811?)

The Order of the Union (1806–1807) and the Royal Order of Merit (1806–1807) merged to become the Royal Order of Holland (1807). This new order became the Royal Order of the Union (1807–1808), also known as the Royal Order of the Union of Holland (1808) and finally the Royal Order of the Union (1808).

The order's chaotic history has led some to argue that the Royal Order of Holland broke up in 1807. Other authors such as Schutte, Van Zelm van Eldik and George Sanders emphasize its continuity. They write that the order established in 1806 died out at the same time as the Kingdom of Holland. The continuity is reflected in a letter or circular in French in which Grand Chancellor Maarten van der Goes van Dirxland explains that all these orders all actually made up one order and that "the Knights of the Royal order of Holland can also bear the name of Knights of the union. Union is the aim and foundation of the order. This article must be inserted into the order's statutes. Perhaps it would be convenient to make it the first one?".

== History ==
Louis was made king of the new Kingdom of Holland on 6 June 1806. Like the other Bonapartes, he wanted to add the luster of pomp and knighthood to his reign. Until 1806 the Netherlands had always been a republic and so had no pre-existing system of orders so, on 24 August 1806, Louis wrote to Napoleon (then in Aachen):

I wish to form an order of the Union. This would be a great deed. I beg Your Majesty to tell me if he approves of the drawing that I had the liberty of addressing to him. It would be simply honorific, without any kind of treating. The motto round it signifies "Unity makes strength".

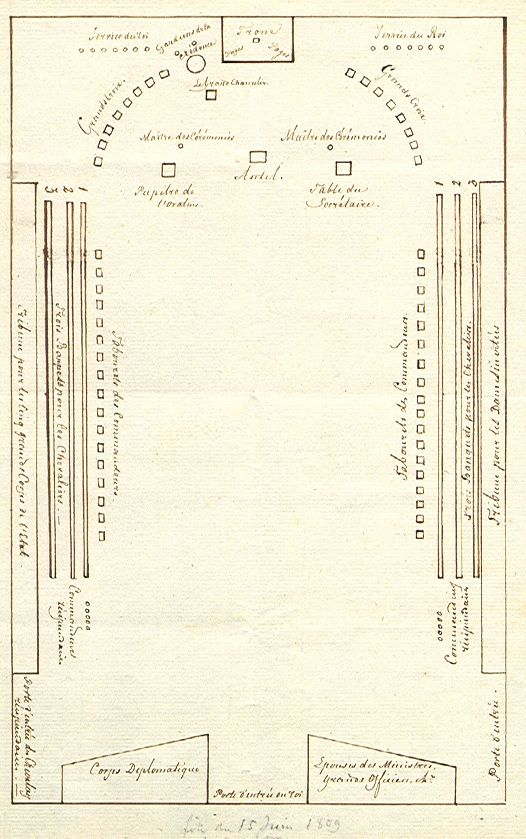
Seating plan for the third meeting of the Royal Order of the Union in June 1809.

== Appointments ==
- Adipati Soero Adinegoro, appointed Ridder (Knight) in 1808: a Chinese-Javanese nobleman, government official.
- Adriaan Pieter Twent van Raaphorst: a Dutch politician and government minister during the reign of Louis Bonaparte as King of Holland
