= Joannes Josephus van Mulken =

Dutch politician

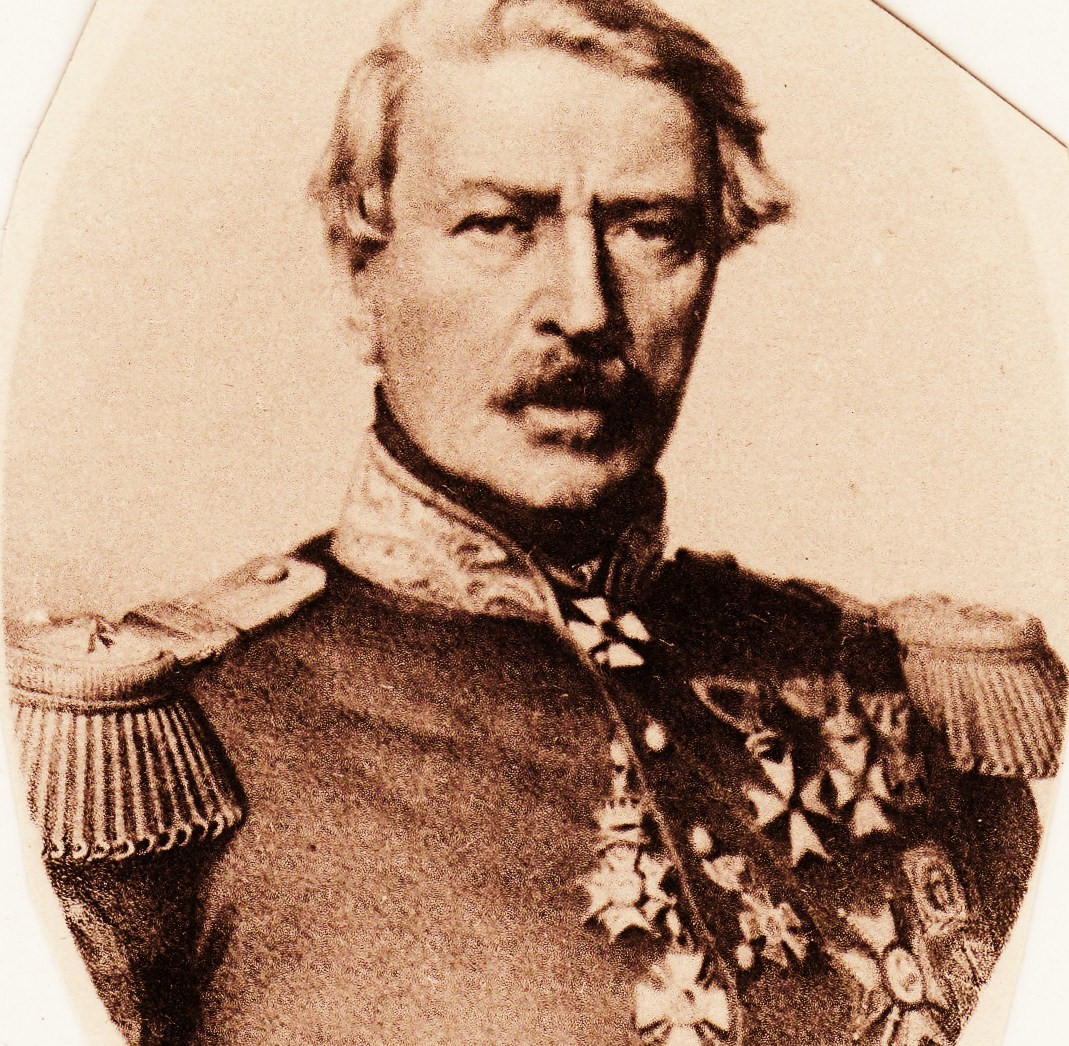
Joannes Josephus van Mulken

Joannes Josephus van Mulken (29 July 1796 – 21 October 1879) was a Dutch military officer and Secretary of War.

== See also ==
Political offices
Preceded by Johannes Adrianus van den Bosch	Minister of War; 1868–1871	Succeeded by Gerardus Petrus Booms
Preceded by The Count van Zuylen van Nijevelt	Minister of Foreign Affairs (interim); 1868	Succeeded by Theodorus Marinus Roest van Limburg
Preceded by Theodorus Marinus Roest van Limburg	Minister of Foreign Affairs (interim); 1870–1871	Succeeded by Baron Gericke van Herwijnen
