= Schelto van Heemstra =

Dutch politician (1807–1864)

His Excellency Schelto van Heemstra
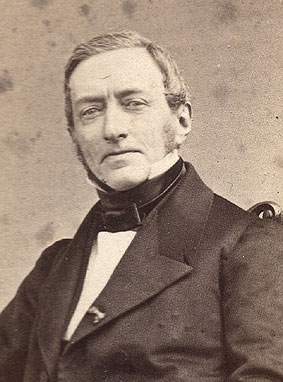

8th Prime Minister of the Netherlands
- In office 10 November 1861 – 1 February 1862
- Monarch: William III
- Preceded by: Jacob van Zuylen van Nijevelt
- Succeeded by: Johan Rudolph Thorbecke

Personal details
- Born: Schelto baron van Heemstra; 14 November 1807 Groningen, Netherlands
- Died: 20 December 1864 (aged 57) Maartensdijk, Netherlands
- Spouses: Henriëtte de Waal; Marianna van Blokland
- Children: 6

Schelto, Baron van Heemstra (14 November 1807 – 20 December 1864) was a Dutch politician. He was Prime Minister from 1861 to 1862.

Van Heemstra was born in Groningen, the son of politician Willem Hendrik van Heemstra and Johanna Balthazarina van Idsinga. Van Heemskerk went to secondary school in Franeker and studied law in Groningen. After a short period working as a lawyer in Leeuwarden he was appointed in 1830 as Grietman for Doniawerstal. He took part in the Ten Days' Campaign in 1831. He became Grietman of Oostdongeradeel in 1840 and in 1844 joined the House of Representatives in The Hague on behalf of the province of Friesland. In that position he was part of a group led by Johan Rudolph Thorbecke called the "Ninemen" (Note: Besides Thorbecke and Van Heemstra the members of this group were Luzac, Van Dam Van Isselt, Van Rechteren, De Kempenaer, Storm, Wichers en Anemaet.) who proposed changes to the Dutch Constitution. Although the proposal was rejected in 1845 it led to the Constitutional Reform of 1848.

Van Heemstra was the King's Commissioner for Utrecht from 1850 to 1858 and for Zeeland from 1858 to 1860.

In March 1861 Van Heemstra was appointed Minister of the Interior in the Van Hall-Van Heemstra cabinet. As minister, he was responsible, with Van Hall, for the introduction of legislation for the construction of state railways. After the resignation of Jacob van Zuylen van Nijevelt in November 1861 he became chairman of the Council of Ministers, an office now known as Prime Minister. His proposal for the state budget was rejected by parliament in December of that year which led to the fall of the cabinet and its formal resignation in February 1862. In 1862 he was given the honorary title of Minister of State.

Van Heemstra was awarded the Order of the Netherlands Lion and the Order of the Oak Crown.

He was married to Henriëtte Hildegonde de Waal in June 1833 with whom he had six children. De Waal died in May 1857. In May 1858 he wed Marianna A.J. Storij van Blokland.
