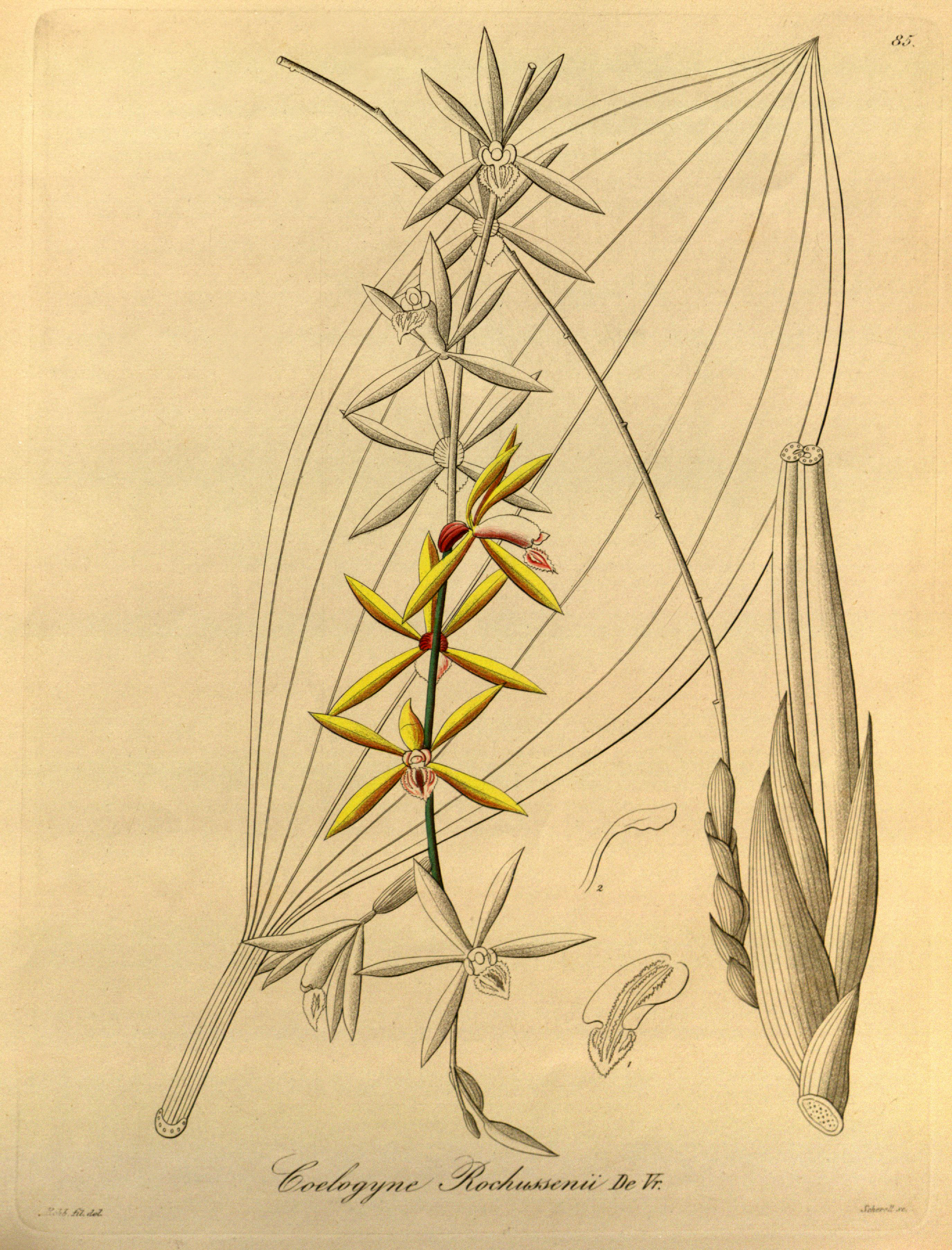

Scientific classification
- Kingdom: Plantae
- Clade: Tracheophytes
- Clade: Angiosperms
- Clade: Monocots
- Order: Asparagales
- Family: Orchidaceae
- Subfamily: Epidendroideae
- Tribe: Arethuseae
- Genus: Coelogyne
- Species: C. rochussenii

Binomial name
- Coelogyne rochussenii de Vriese (1854)

Synonyms
- Coelogyne plantaginea Lindl. (1855); Coelogyne stellaris Rchb.f. (1886); Coelogyne macrobulbon Hook.f. (1890); Pleione rochussenii (de Vriese) Kuntze (1891); Pleione macrobulbon (Hook.f.) Kuntze (1891); Pleione plantaginea (Lindl.) Kuntze (1891); Coelogyne steffiensii Schltr. (1925)

= Coelogyne rochussenii =

Species of orchid

Coelogyne rochussenii is a species of orchid can be found in Southeast Asia.
