= Ludolph Anne Jan Wilt Sloet van de Beele =

Dutch politician

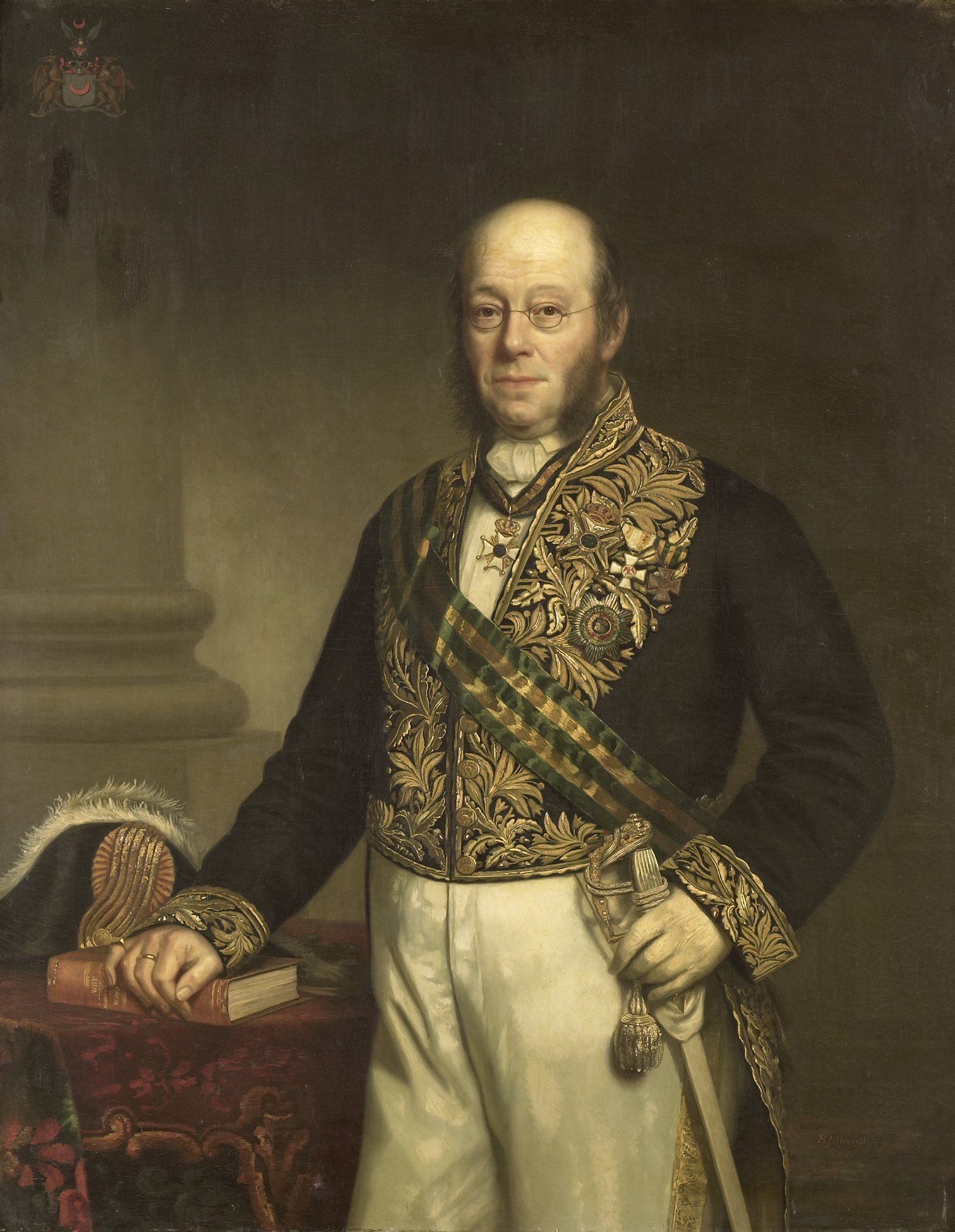

Governor-General of the Dutch East Indies
- In office 19 October 1861 – 25 October 1866
- Monarch: William III
- Preceded by: Charles Ferdinand Pahud
- Succeeded by: Pieter Mijer

Personal details
- Born: 28 March 1806 Voorst, Batavian Republic
- Died: 10 December 1890 (aged 84) Arnhem, Netherlands

Ludolph Anne Jan Wilt, Baron Sloet van de Beele (28 March 1806 – 10 December 1890) was the Governor-General of the Dutch East Indies in 1861–1866.

Political offices
| Preceded by Charles Ferdinand Pahud | Governor-General of the Dutch East Indies; 1861–1866 | Succeeded by Pieter Mijer |
