= Julius van Zuylen van Nijevelt =

Dutch politician (1819–1894)

His Excellency Julius, Count van Zuylen van Nijevelt
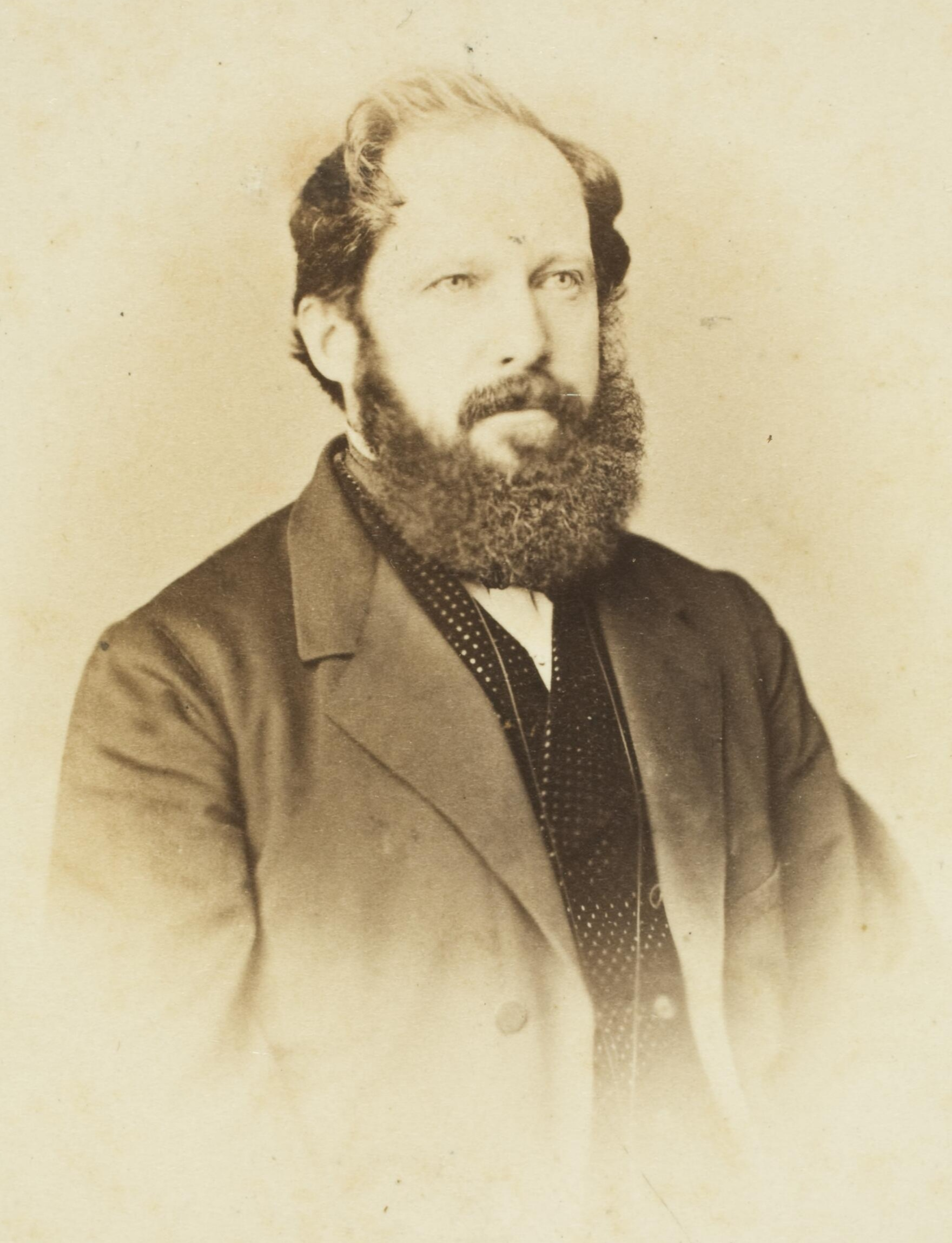
- van Zuylen van Nijevelt, c. 1875

Chairman of the Council of Ministers
- In office 1 June 1866 – 4 June 1868
- Monarch: William III
- Preceded by: Isaäc Dignus Fransen van de Putte
- Succeeded by: Pieter Philip van Bosse

Personal details
- Born: Julius Philip Jacob Adriaan van Zuylen van Nijevelt; 19 August 1819 Dommeldange, Luxembourg
- Died: 1 July 1894 (aged 74) The Hague, Netherlands
- Spouse: Catherine Nixon
- Children: 5
- Parent: Pieter Hendrik van Zuylen van Nijevelt (father)
- Education: Utrecht University

Julius Philip Jacob Adriaan, Count van Zuylen van Nijevelt (19 August 1819 – 1 July 1894) was a conservative Dutch politician who served as Minister of Foreign Affairs from 1860 until 1861, and again from 1866 until 1868. During his second ministership, he also served as Chairman of the Council of Ministers.

== Early life ==
Julius Philip Jacob Adriaan van Zuylen van Nijevelt was born in Dommeldange in Luxembourg on 19 August 1819 to Pieter Hendrik, Count van Zuylen van Nijevelt and Suzanna Martha, Baroness van Zuylen van Nijevelt. He started studying at Utrecht University on 24 January 1838, and obtained the Master of Laws degree on 28 June 1841.

== Career ==
Van Zuylen van Nijevelt started his diplomatic career as attaché at the Ministry of Foreign Affairs in The Hague in February 1842, at the age of 23. He occupied diplomatic posts in Hanover, Berlin and Vienna before returning to The Hague in 1848. In spring of that year, he was sent to Paris in the aftermath of the French Revolution of 1848. After his return, he became chargé d'affaires in Brussels, and subsequently secretary to the diplomatic mission. During his time in Brussels, Van Zuylen van Nijevelt was influenced by the Réveil movement, and felt uneasy having to serve a Catholic envoy and a Catholic Minister of Foreign Affairs. He felt more at home at his following post in London, where he observed the anti-Catholic reaction to the Universalis Ecclesiae in 1850. He was delighted to hear of the similar reaction to the reestablishment of the episcopal hierarchy in the Netherlands in 1853.

Van Zuylen van Nijevelt was sent to Constantinople in 1855 to succeed the resident minister, who had been recalled to the Netherlands following corruption charges. During the six years he spent there, he acted as protector and promotor of Christianity, which earned him international recognition. He offered The Union Church of Istanbul to use the Dutch Chapel. He also wrote reports on Dutch colonisation, including on Rhodes, and sought out locations for Dutch trading posts in anticipation of the opening of the Suez Canal.

Following the 1860 Dutch general election, Floris Adriaan van Hall was tasked with forming a government. While he had sought the ministerial post of Foreign Affairs for himself, he was forced to take the Finance portfolio. Instead, Van Zuylen van Nijevelt was recalled to be appointed Minister of Foreign Affairs on 4 April 1860. His policy was aimed at maintaining neutrality, avoiding entanglement and guarding against foreign interference. The Netherlands' role in international affairs lay beyond Europe, in its colonies. He resigned on 14 January 1861 in protest of Van Hall's political opportunism. In April 1861, he was elected to the House of Representatives for Zwolle, a seat vacated by his cousin Jacob van Zuylen van Nijevelt, who had succeeded him as Minister of Foreign Affairs.

Van Zuylen van Nijevelt served as Prime Minister of the Netherlands (chairman of the Council of Ministers) from 1866 to 1868. He also served as minister of Foreign Affairs from 1860 to 1861, and again from 1866 tot 1868.

== Private life ==
He married in Scotland and had three sons and two daughters.

A member of the prominent Rotterdam patrician (regenten) family of Van Zuylen van Nijevelt, he was a son of Pieter Hendrik van Zuylen van Nijevelt, a Dutch general who was present at the Battle of Waterloo, among others.

== Honours ==
- 1849: Officer in the Order of Leopold.

== Sources ==
- Blok, P.J.; Molhuysen, P.C. (1933). "Zuylen van Nijevelt, Mr. Julius Philip Jacob Adriaan graaf van". Nieuw Nederlandsch Biografisch Woordenboek. 9: 1326–1331.
- Huizinga, J.J. (1980). "Herinneringen van J.P.J.A. Graaf van Zuylen van Nijevelt 1819-1887". Nederlandse historische bronnen. 2: 204–215.

House of Representatives of the Netherlands
Preceded by Jacob van Zuylen van Nijevelt	Member for Zwolle; 1861–1862; With: Pieter Mijer	Succeeded by Gerrit Abraham de Meester
Preceded by Guillaume Groen van Prinsterer	Member for Arnhem; 1865–1866; With: Willem van Lynden	Succeeded by Levinus Keuchenius
Preceded by Ludolph Sloet van de Beele	Member for Arnhem; 1871–1875; With: Willem Hendrik Dullert	Succeeded by Johan Herman Geertsema
Political offices
Preceded by Floris Adriaan van Hall	Minister of Foreign Affairs; 1860–1861	Succeeded by Louis van der Goes van Dirxland
Preceded by Eppo Cremers	Minister of Foreign Affairs; 1866–1868	Succeeded by Joannes Josephus van Mulken
Dutch nobility
Preceded by Philip Julius van Zuylen van Nijevelt	Count van Zuylen van Nijevelt; 1826–1894	Succeeded by Philip Julius Henry van Zuylen van Nijevelt
