= Theodorus Marinus Roest van Limburg =

Dutch journalist, diplomat, and politician

His Excellency Theodorus Marinus Roest van Limburg
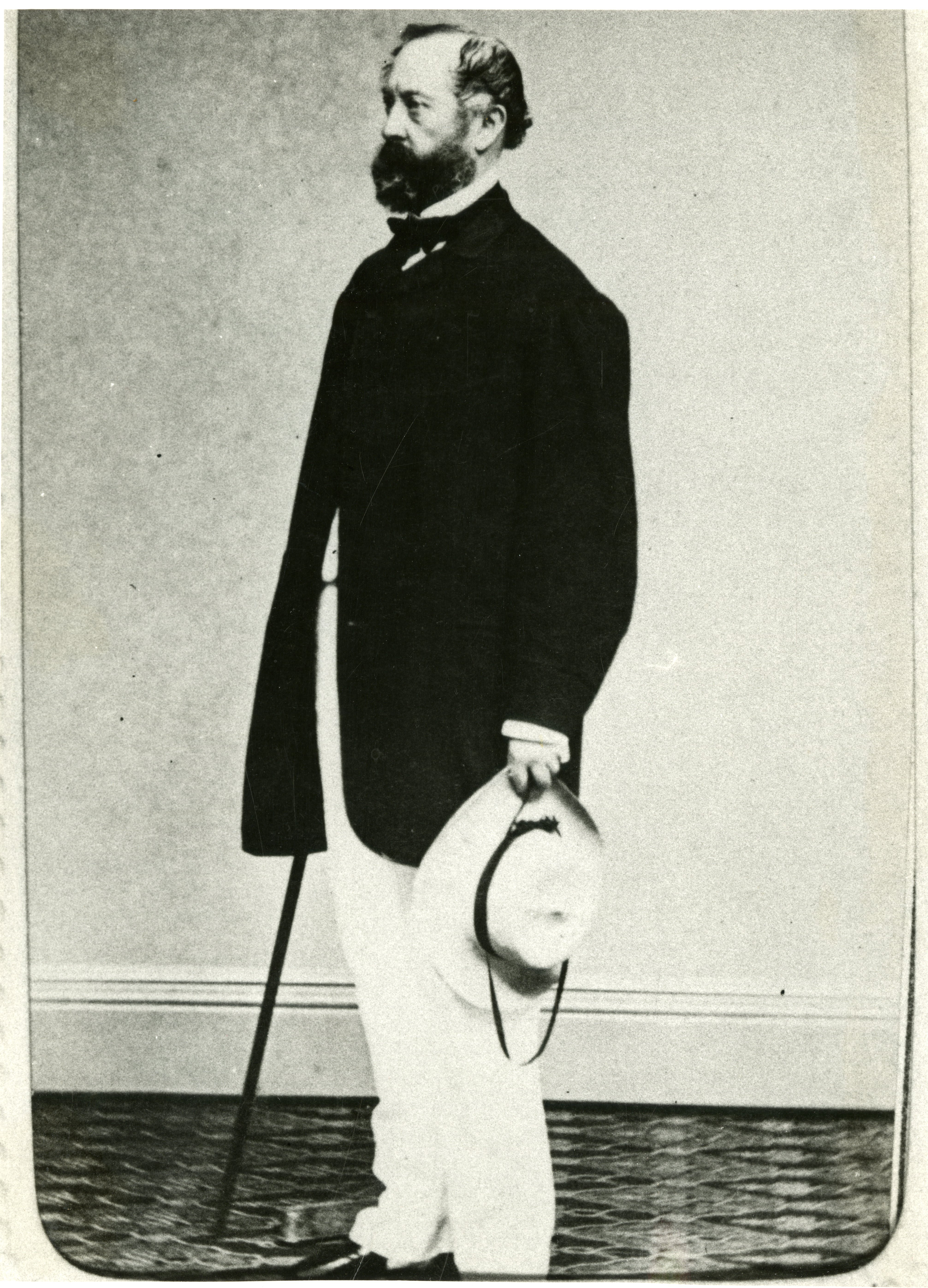

Minister of Foreign Affairs
- In office 1868–1870
- Preceded by: Joannes van Mulken
- Succeeded by: Joannes van Mulken

Envoy to the United States
- In office 1856–1868

Chargé d’affaires to Portugal
- In office 1851–1856

Personal details
- Born: 8 July 1806 Rotterdam, Netherlands
- Died: 3 March 1887 (aged 80) Florence, Italy
- Spouse: Isabella Cass (m. 1858; died 1879)
- Occupation: Editor of Arnhemsche Courant

Theodorus Marinus Roest van Limburg (8 July 1806, in Rotterdam – 3 March 1887, in Florence) was a Dutch journalist, diplomat, and politician.

== Early life ==
Theodorus Marinus was the son of Jacob Adriaan Roest van Limburg, merchant in wine at Rotterdam and Antwerpen, and Sara Cornelia Rochussen. He studied law in Liège, Ghent and Leiden (1827-1831).

== Career ==
He worked at the Departments of Colonies and Foreign Affairs. From 1837 till 1841 he served as editor of the liberal newspaper Arnhemsche Courant. His diplomatic career started in 1842, when he was named secretary of the Dutch Legation in Vienna. From 1851-1856 he served as Chargé d’affaires in Lisbon and he became Envoy in Washington, serving from 1856 until 1868.

Roest van Limburg became Minister of Foreign Affairs in 1868. His tenure as Foreign Minister was marked by the Franco-German War from 1870 to 1871 in the liberal cabinet of Prime Minister Pieter Philip van Bosse. There was little confidence in him in the House of Representatives which led to his resignation, which was honorably granted. After his resignation he lived abroad.

== Personal life ==
On 23 August 1858, Roest van Limburg was married to the American Isabella "Belle" Cass (1805-1879) in Stonington, Michigan. Isabella was the daughter of Elizabeth (née Spencer) Cass and Lewis Cass, who served as governor of the Michigan Territory, U.S. Secretary of War, U.S. Secretary of State, U.S. Ambassador to France, and a U.S. Senator.

He died on 3 March 1887 in Florence.
