= List of ministers of foreign affairs of the Netherlands =

Minister of Foreign Affairs of the Netherlands
- Minister van Buitenlandse Zaken
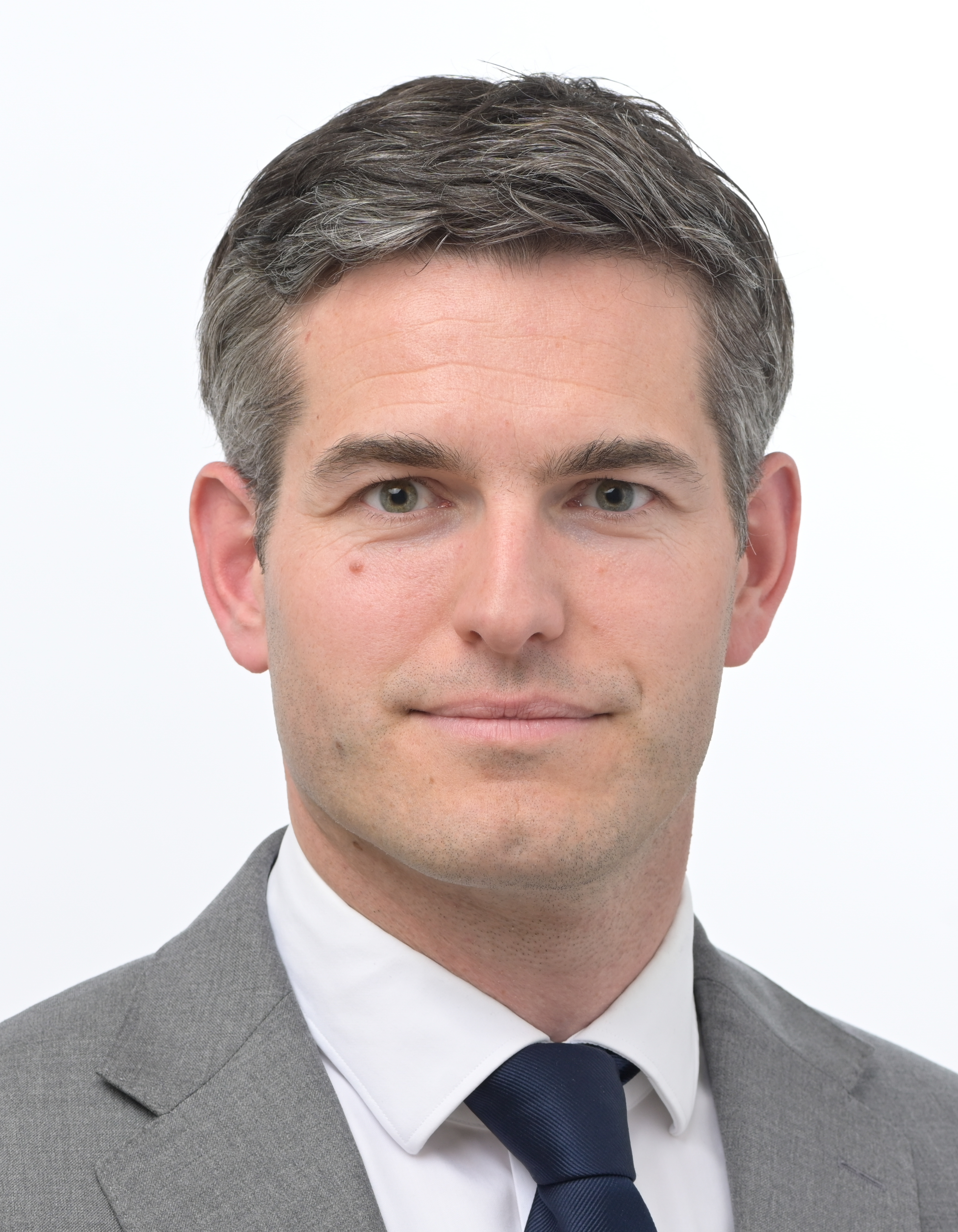
- Incumbent; Tom Berendsen since 23 February 2026
- Ministry of Foreign Affairs
- Style: His/Her Excellency
- Member of: Council of Ministers
- Appointer: The monarch; on advice of the prime minister
- Formation: 9 March 1798; 228 years ago
- First holder: Willem Berend Buys as Secretary for Foreign Affairs
- Salary: €205,991 (As of 2025)

The minister of foreign affairs (Dutch: minister van Buitenlandse Zaken) is a member of the cabinet of the Netherlands and the head of the Ministry of Foreign Affairs. The officeholder is in charge of the Kingdom's foreign policy and international relations. The current minister, Tom Berendsen, has served since 23 February 2026.

Alongside the minister, a minister without portfolio is usually attached to the ministry to oversee development cooperation and trade promotion. Multiple cabinets have also included a state secretary responsible for specific sub-portfolios, such as European affairs.

== List of ministers of foreign affairs ==
Cabinet	Minister			Term of office	
Cabinet	Image	Name	Party	Start	End
Schimmelpenninck	Gerrit Schimmelpenninck	Gerrit Schimmelpenninck	Independent	25 March 1848	17 May 1848
Schimmelpenninck		Arnold Adolf Bentinck van Nijenhuis	Independent	17 May 1848	21 November 1848
De Kempenaer–Donker Curtius		Leonardus Antonius Lightenvelt	Independent	21 November 1848	1 November 1849
Thorbecke I	Herman van Sonsbeeck	Herman van Sonsbeeck	Independent	1 November 1849	16 October 1852
Thorbecke I	Jacob van Zuylen van Nijevelt	Jacob van Zuylen van Nijevelt	Independent	16 October 1852	19 April 1853
Van Hall–Donker Curtius	Floris Adriaan van Hall	Floris Adriaan van Hall	Independent	19 April 1853	1 July 1856
Van der Brugghen		Daniël Théodore Gevers van Endegeest	Independent	1 July 1856	18 March 1858
Rochussen		Jan Karel van Goltstein	Independent	18 March 1858	23 February 1860
Van Hall–Van Heemstra	Floris Adriaan van Hall	Floris Adriaan van Hall (ad interim)	Independent	23 February 1860	4 April 1860
Van Hall–Van Heemstra	Julius van Zuylen van Nijevelt	Julius van Zuylen van Nijevelt	Independent	4 April 1860	14 January 1861
Van Hall–Van Heemstra		Louis Napoleon van der Goes van Dirxland	Independent	14 January 1861	14 March 1861
Van Zuylen van Nijevelt–Van Heemstra	Jacob van Zuylen van Nijevelt	Jacob van Zuylen van Nijevelt	Independent	14 March 1861	10 November 1861
Van Zuylen van Nijevelt–Van Heemstra		Martin Pascal Hubert Strens (ad interim)	Independent	10 November 1861	1 February 1862
Thorbecke II		Anthony Jan Lucas Stratenus (ad interim)	Independent	1 February 1862	12 March 1862
Thorbecke II		Paul Therèse van der Maesen de Sombreff	Independent	12 March 1862	2 January 1864
Thorbecke II	Willem Huyssen van Kattendijke	Willem Huyssen van Kattendijke (ad interim)	Independent	2 January 1864	15 March 1864
Thorbecke II		Eppo Cremers	Independent	15 March 1864	1 June 1866
Fransen van de Putte		Eppo Cremers	Independent	15 March 1864	1 June 1866
Van Zuylen van Nijevelt	Julius van Zuylen van Nijevelt	Julius van Zuylen van Nijevelt	Independent	1 June 1866	4 June 1868
Van Bosse–Fock	Joannes Josephus van Mulken	Joannes Josephus van Mulken (ad interim)	Independent	4 June 1868	8 June 1868
Van Bosse–Fock		Theodorus Marinus Roest van Limburg	Independent	8 June 1868	12 December 1870
Thorbecke III	Joannes Josephus van Mulken	Joannes Josephus van Mulken (ad interim)	Independent	12 December 1870	18 January 1871
De Vries–Fransen van de Putte	Louis Gericke van Herwijnen	Louis Gericke van Herwijnen	Independent	18 January 1871	27 August 1874
Heemskerk–Van Lynden van Sandenburg	Joseph van der Does de Willebois	Joseph van der Does de Willebois	Independent	27 August 1874	3 November 1877
Kappeyne van de Coppello	Willem van Heeckeren van Kell	Willem van Heeckeren van Kell	Independent	3 November 1877	20 August 1879
Van Lynden van Sandenburg	Theo van Lynden van Sandenburg	Theo van Lynden van Sandenburg	Independent	20 August 1879	15 September 1881
Van Lynden van Sandenburg	Willem Frederik Rochussen	Willem Frederik Rochussen	Independent	15 September 1881	23 April 1883
Jan Heemskerk	Joseph van der Does de Willebois	Joseph van der Does de Willebois	Independent	23 April 1883	10 August 1885
Jan Heemskerk	Marc Willem du Tour van Bellinchave	Marc Willem du Tour van Bellinchave (ad interim)	Independent	10 August 1885	14 September 1885
Jan Heemskerk	Joseph van der Does de Willebois	Joseph van der Does de Willebois	Independent	14 September 1885	1 November 1885
Jan Heemskerk	Abraham van Karnebeek	Abraham van Karnebeek	Independent	1 November 1885	21 April 1888
Mackay	Cornelis Hartsen	Cornelis Hartsen	Independent	21 April 1888	21 August 1891
Van Tienhoven	Gijsbert van Tienhoven	Gijsbert van Tienhoven	Independent	21 August 1891	21 March 1894
Van Tienhoven	Joannes Coenraad Jansen	Joannes Coenraad Jansen (ad interim)	LU	21 March 1894	9 May 1894
Röell	Joan Röell	Joan Röell	Independent	9 May 1894	27 July 1897
Pierson	Willem de Beaufort	Willem de Beaufort	Independent	27 July 1897	1 August 1901
Kuyper		Robert Melvil van Lynden	ARP	1 August 1901	9 March 1905
Kuyper	Abraham George Ellis	Abraham George Ellis (ad interim)	Independent	9 March 1905	22 April 1905
Kuyper		Willem van Weede van Berencamp	Independent	22 April 1905	7 August 1905
Kuyper	Abraham George Ellis	Abraham George Ellis (ad interim)	Independent	7 August 1905	17 August 1905
De Meester		Dirk van Tets van Goudriaan	Independent	17 August 1905	12 February 1908
Theo Heemskerk	René de Marees van Swinderen	René de Marees van Swinderen	Independent	12 February 1908	29 August 1913
Cort van der Linden	Pieter Cort van der Linden	Pieter Cort van der Linden (ad interim)	Independent	29 August 1913	27 September 1913
Cort van der Linden	John Loudon	John Loudon	Independent	27 September 1913	9 September 1918
Ruijs de Beerenbrouck I	Herman van Karnebeek	Herman van Karnebeek	Independent	9 September 1918	1 April 1927
Ruijs de Beerenbrouck II	Herman van Karnebeek	Herman van Karnebeek	Independent	9 September 1918	1 April 1927
Colijn I	Herman van Karnebeek	Herman van Karnebeek	Independent	9 September 1918	1 April 1927
De Geer I	Frans Beelaerts van Blokland	Frans Beelaerts van Blokland	CHU	1 April 1927	20 April 1933
Ruijs de Beerenbrouck III	Frans Beelaerts van Blokland	Frans Beelaerts van Blokland	CHU	1 April 1927	20 April 1933
Ruijs de Beerenbrouck III	Charles Ruijs de Beerenbrouck	Charles Ruijs de Beerenbrouck (ad interim)	RKSP	20 April 1933	26 May 1933
Colijn II	Andries Cornelis Dirk de Graeff	Andries Cornelis Dirk de Graeff	Independent	26 May 1933	24 June 1937
Colijn III	Andries Cornelis Dirk de Graeff	Andries Cornelis Dirk de Graeff	Independent	26 May 1933	24 June 1937
Colijn IV	Hendrikus Colijn	Hendrikus Colijn (ad interim)	ARP	24 June 1937	1 October 1937
Colijn IV	Jacob Adriaan Patijn	Jacob Adriaan Patijn	Independent	1 October 1937	10 August 1939
Colijn V	Jacob Adriaan Patijn	Jacob Adriaan Patijn	Independent	1 October 1937	10 August 1939
De Geer II	Eelco van Kleffens	Eelco van Kleffens	Independent	10 August 1939	1 March 1946
Gerbrandy I	Eelco van Kleffens	Eelco van Kleffens	Independent	10 August 1939	1 March 1946
Gerbrandy II	Eelco van Kleffens	Eelco van Kleffens	Independent	10 August 1939	1 March 1946
Gerbrandy III	Eelco van Kleffens	Eelco van Kleffens	Independent	10 August 1939	1 March 1946
Schermerhorn–Drees	Herman van Roijen	Herman van Roijen	Independent	1 March 1946	3 July 1946
Beel I	Pim van Boetzelaer van Oosterhout	Pim van Boetzelaer van Oosterhout	Independent	3 July 1946	7 August 1948
Drees–Van Schaik	Dirk Stikker	Dirk Stikker	VVD	7 August 1948	2 September 1952
Drees I	Dirk Stikker	Dirk Stikker	VVD	7 August 1948	2 September 1952
Drees II	Johan Beyen	Johan Beyen	Independent	2 September 1952	13 October 1956
Drees III	Joseph Luns	Joseph Luns	KVP	13 October 1956	6 July 1971
Beel II	Joseph Luns	Joseph Luns	KVP	13 October 1956	6 July 1971
De Quay	Joseph Luns	Joseph Luns	KVP	13 October 1956	6 July 1971
Marijnen	Joseph Luns	Joseph Luns	KVP	13 October 1956	6 July 1971
Cals	Joseph Luns	Joseph Luns	KVP	13 October 1956	6 July 1971
Zijlstra	Joseph Luns	Joseph Luns	KVP	13 October 1956	6 July 1971
De Jong	Joseph Luns	Joseph Luns	KVP	13 October 1956	6 July 1971
Biesheuvel I	Norbert Schmelzer	Norbert Schmelzer	KVP	6 July 1971	11 May 1973
Biesheuvel II	Norbert Schmelzer	Norbert Schmelzer	KVP	6 July 1971	11 May 1973
Den Uyl	Max van der Stoel	Max van der Stoel	PvdA	11 May 1973	19 December 1977
Van Agt I	Chris van der Klaauw	Chris van der Klaauw	VVD	19 December 1977	11 September 1981
Van Agt II	Max van der Stoel	Max van der Stoel	PvdA	11 September 1981	29 May 1982
Van Agt III	Dries van Agt	Dries van Agt	CDA	29 May 1982	4 November 1982
Lubbers I	Hans van den Broek	Hans van den Broek	CDA	4 November 1982	3 January 1993
Lubbers II	Hans van den Broek	Hans van den Broek	CDA	4 November 1982	3 January 1993
Lubbers III	Hans van den Broek	Hans van den Broek	CDA	4 November 1982	3 January 1993
Lubbers III	Pieter Kooijmans	Pieter Kooijmans	CDA	3 January 1993	22 August 1994
Kok I	Hans van Mierlo	Hans van Mierlo	D66	22 August 1994	3 August 1998
Kok II	Jozias van Aartsen	Jozias van Aartsen	VVD	3 August 1998	22 July 2002
Balkenende I	Jaap de Hoop Scheffer	Jaap de Hoop Scheffer	CDA	22 July 2002	3 December 2003
Balkenende II	Jaap de Hoop Scheffer	Jaap de Hoop Scheffer	CDA	22 July 2002	3 December 2003
Balkenende II	Ben Bot	Ben Bot	CDA	3 December 2003	22 February 2007
Balkenende III	Ben Bot	Ben Bot	CDA	3 December 2003	22 February 2007
Balkenende IV	Maxime Verhagen	Maxime Verhagen	CDA	22 February 2007	14 October 2010
Rutte I	Uri Rosenthal	Uri Rosenthal	VVD	14 October 2010	5 November 2012
Rutte II	Frans Timmermans	Frans Timmermans	PvdA	5 November 2012	17 October 2014
Rutte II	Bert Koenders	Bert Koenders	PvdA	17 October 2014	26 October 2017
Rutte III	Halbe Zijlstra	Halbe Zijlstra	VVD	26 October 2017	13 February 2018
Rutte III	Sigrid Kaag	Sigrid Kaag (ad interim)	D66	13 February 2018	7 March 2018
Rutte III	Stef Blok	Stef Blok	VVD	7 March 2018	25 May 2021
Rutte III	Sigrid Kaag	Sigrid Kaag	D66	25 May 2021	17 September 2021
Rutte III	Tom de Bruijn	Tom de Bruijn (ad interim)	D66	17 September 2021	24 September 2021
Rutte III	Ben Knapen	Ben Knapen	CDA	24 September 2021	10 January 2022
Rutte IV	Wopke Hoekstra	Wopke Hoekstra	CDA	10 January 2022	1 September 2023
Rutte IV	Liesje Schreinemacher	Liesje Schreinemacher (ad interim)	VVD	1 September 2023	5 September 2023
Rutte IV	Hanke Bruins Slot	Hanke Bruins Slot	CDA	5 September 2023	2 July 2024
Schoof	Caspar Veldkamp	Caspar Veldkamp	NSC	2 July 2024	22 August 2025
Schoof	Ruben Brekelmans	Ruben Brekelmans (ad interim)	VVD	22 August 2025	5 September 2025
Schoof	David Van Weel	David van Weel	VVD	5 September 2025	23 February 2026
Jetten	Tom Berendsen	Tom Berendsen	CDA	23 February 2026	Incumbent

== List of ministers without portfolio ==
Cabinet	Minister			Term of office		Title or role
Cabinet	Image	Name	Party	Start	End	Title or role
Gerbrandy II	Edgar Michiels van Verduynen	Edgar Michiels van Verduynen	Independent	1 January 1942	25 June 1945	Deputy Minister of Foreign Affairs
Gerbrandy III	Edgar Michiels van Verduynen	Edgar Michiels van Verduynen	Independent	1 January 1942	25 June 1945	Deputy Minister of Foreign Affairs
Schermerhorn–Drees	Herman van Roijen	Herman van Roijen	Independent	25 June 1945	1 March 1946	Deputy Minister of Foreign Affairs
Beel I	Eelco van Kleffens	Eelco van Kleffens	Independent	1 March 1946	1 July 1947	Permanent Representative to the United Nations Security Council
Drees II	Joseph Luns	Joseph Luns	KVP	2 September 1952	13 October 1956	Deputy Minister of Foreign Affairs
Cals	Theo Bot	Theo Bot	KVP	14 April 1965	5 April 1967	Minister for Aid to Developing Countries
Zijlstra	Theo Bot	Theo Bot	KVP	14 April 1965	5 April 1967	Minister for Aid to Developing Countries
De Jong	Bé Udink	Bé Udink	CHU	5 April 1967	6 July 1971	Minister for Aid to Developing Countries
Biesheuvel I	Kees Boertien	Kees Boertien	ARP	6 July 1971	11 May 1973	Minister for Development Cooperation
Biesheuvel II	Kees Boertien	Kees Boertien	ARP	6 July 1971	11 May 1973	Minister for Development Cooperation
Den Uyl	Jan Pronk	Jan Pronk	PvdA	11 May 1973	19 December 1977	Minister for Development Cooperation
Van Agt I	Jan de Koning	Jan de Koning	ARP	19 December 1977	11 September 1981	Minister for Development Cooperation
Van Agt II	Kees van Dijk	Kees van Dijk	CDA	11 September 1981	4 November 1982	Minister for Development Cooperation
Van Agt III	Kees van Dijk	Kees van Dijk	CDA	11 September 1981	4 November 1982	Minister for Development Cooperation
Lubbers I	Eegje Schoo	Eegje Schoo	VVD	4 November 1982	14 July 1986	Minister for Development Cooperation
Lubbers II	Piet Bukman	Piet Bukman	CDA	14 July 1986	7 November 1989	Minister for Development Cooperation
Lubbers III	Jan Pronk	Jan Pronk	PvdA	7 November 1989	3 August 1998	Minister for Development Cooperation
Kok I	Jan Pronk	Jan Pronk	PvdA	7 November 1989	3 August 1998	Minister for Development Cooperation
Kok II	Eveline Herfkens	Eveline Herfkens	PvdA	3 August 1998	22 July 2002	Minister for Development Cooperation
Balkenende II	Agnes van Ardenne	Agnes van Ardenne	CDA	27 May 2003	22 February 2007	Minister for Development Cooperation
Balkenende III	Agnes van Ardenne	Agnes van Ardenne	CDA	27 May 2003	22 February 2007	Minister for Development Cooperation
Balkenende IV	Bert Koenders	Bert Koenders	PvdA	22 February 2007	23 February 2010	Minister for Development Cooperation
Balkenende IV	Maxime Verhagen	Maxime Verhagen	CDA	23 February 2010	14 October 2010	Minister for Development Cooperation
Rutte II	Lilianne Ploumen	Lilianne Ploumen	PvdA	5 November 2012	26 October 2017	Minister for Foreign Trade and Development Cooperation
Rutte III	Sigrid Kaag	Sigrid Kaag	D66	26 October 2017	10 August 2021	Minister for Foreign Trade and Development Cooperation
Rutte III	Tom de Bruijn	Tom de Bruijn	D66	10 August 2021	10 January 2022	Minister for Foreign Trade and Development Cooperation
Rutte IV	Liesje Schreinemacher	Liesje Schreinemacher	VVD	10 January 2022	4 December 2023	Minister for Foreign Trade and Development Cooperation
Rutte IV	Geoffrey van Leeuwen	Geoffrey van Leeuwen (acting)	VVD	4 December 2023	15 April 2024	Minister for Foreign Trade and Development Cooperation
Rutte IV	Liesje Schreinemacher	Liesje Schreinemacher	VVD	15 April 2024	2 July 2024	Minister for Foreign Trade and Development Cooperation
Schoof	Reinette Klever	Reinette Klever	PVV	2 July 2024	3 June 2025	Minister for Foreign Trade and Development Aid
Schoof	Caspar Veldkamp	Caspar Veldkamp (ad interim)	NSC	3 June 2025	19 June 2025	Minister for Foreign Trade and Development Aid
Jetten	Sjoerd Sjoerdsma	Sjoerd Sjoerdsma	D66	23 February 2026	Incumbent	Minister of Foreign Trade and Development Cooperation

== List of state secretaries for foreign affairs ==
Cabinet	State secretary			Term of office		Portfolio
Cabinet	Image	Name	Party	Start	End	Portfolio
Drees–Van Schaik	Nico Blom	Nico Blom	Independent	16 February 1950	2 September 1952	Indonesian Affairs
Drees I	Nico Blom	Nico Blom	Independent	16 February 1950	2 September 1952	Indonesian Affairs
Drees III	Ernst van der Beugel	Ernst van der Beugel	PvdA	8 January 1957	22 December 1958	European Affairs
De Quay	Hans van Houten	Hans van Houten	VVD	24 August 1959	24 July 1963	European Affairs
Marijnen	Leo de Block	Leo de Block	KVP	3 September 1963	14 April 1965	European Affairs
Marijnen	Isaäc Nicolaas Diepenhorst	Isaäc Nicolaas Diepenhorst	CHU	28 September 1963	14 April 1965	United Nations Affairs and Aid to Developing Countries
Cals	Leo de Block	Leo de Block	KVP	14 April 1965	22 November 1966	European Affairs
Cals	Max van der Stoel	Max van der Stoel	PvdA	22 July 1965	22 November 1966	United Nations Affairs
Zijlstra	Leo de Block	Leo de Block	KVP	22 November 1966	5 April 1967	European and United Nations Affairs
De Jong	Hans de Koster	Hans de Koster	VVD	12 June 1967	6 July 1971	European Affairs
Biesheuvel I	Tjerk Westerterp	Tjerk Westerterp	KVP	17 August 1971	7 March 1973	European Affairs
Biesheuvel II	Tjerk Westerterp	Tjerk Westerterp	KVP	17 August 1971	7 March 1973	European Affairs
Den Uyl	Laurens Jan Brinkhorst	Laurens Jan Brinkhorst	D66	11 May 1973	8 September 1977	European Affairs
Den Uyl	Pieter Kooijmans	Pieter Kooijmans	ARP	11 May 1973	19 December 1977	United Nations Affairs
Van Agt I	Durk van der Mei	Durk van der Mei	CHU	28 December 1977	11 September 1981	European Affairs
Van Agt II	Hans van den Broek	Hans van den Broek	CDA	11 September 1981	4 November 1982	European Affairs
Van Agt III	Hans van den Broek	Hans van den Broek	CDA	11 September 1981	4 November 1982	European Affairs
Lubbers I	Wim van Eekelen	Wim van Eekelen	VVD	5 November 1982	14 July 1986	European Affairs
Lubbers II	René van der Linden	René van der Linden	CDA	14 July 1986	9 September 1988	European Affairs
Lubbers II	Berend-Jan van Voorst tot Voorst	Berend-Jan van Voorst tot Voorst	CDA	27 September 1988	7 November 1989	European Affairs
Lubbers III	Piet Dankert	Piet Dankert	PvdA	7 November 1989	16 July 1994	European Affairs
Kok I	Michiel Patijn	Michiel Patijn	VVD	22 August 1994	3 August 1998	European Affairs
Kok II	Dick Benschop	Dick Benschop	PvdA	3 August 1998	22 July 2002	European Affairs
Balkenende I	Agnes van Ardenne	Agnes van Ardenne	CDA	22 July 2002	27 May 2003	Development Cooperation
Balkenende I	Atzo Nicolaï	Atzo Nicolaï	VVD	22 July 2002	7 July 2006	European Affairs
Balkenende II	Atzo Nicolaï	Atzo Nicolaï	VVD	22 July 2002	7 July 2006	European Affairs
Balkenende IV	Frans Timmermans	Frans Timmermans	PvdA	22 February 2007	23 February 2010	European Affairs
Rutte I	Ben Knapen	Ben Knapen	CDA	14 October 2010	5 November 2012	European Affairs and Development Cooperation
Schoof	Hanneke Boerma	Hanneke Boerma	NSC	19 June 2025	22 August 2025	Foreign Trade
Schoof	Aukje de Vries	Aukje de Vries	VVD	5 September 2025	23 February 2026	Foreign Trade
