= Johannes Adrianus van den Bosch =

Dutch officer and politician

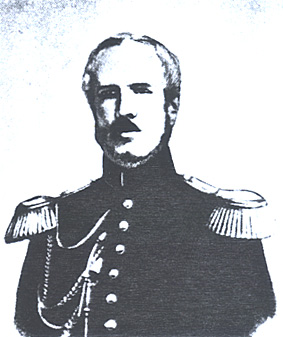
Johannes Adrianus van den Bosch

Johannes Adrianus van den Bosch (3 January 1813, Zuilen - 16 February 1870, Arnhem) was a Dutch officer and politician.

Van den Bosch was Aide-de-camp of the Prince of Orange and of King William III of the Netherlands. He was Minister of War from 1866 to 1968 in the royal cabinet of Julius van Zuylen van Nijevelt.
