= Pieter Mijer (governor) =

Dutch politician (1812–1881)

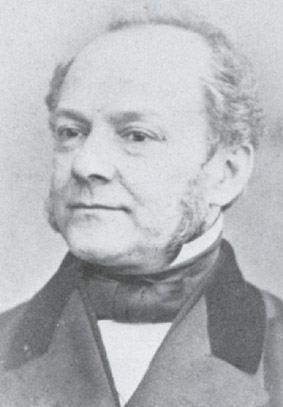

Governor-General of the Dutch East Indies
- In office 28 December 1866 – 1 January 1872
- Monarch: William III
- Preceded by: Ludolph Anne Jan Wilt Sloet van de Beele
- Succeeded by: James Loudon

Personal details
- Born: 3 June 1812 Batavia, Dutch East Indies
- Died: 6 February 1881 (aged 68) Scheveningen, Netherlands

Pieter Mijer (3 June 1812 – 6 February 1881) was the Governor-General of the Dutch East Indies in 1866–1872.

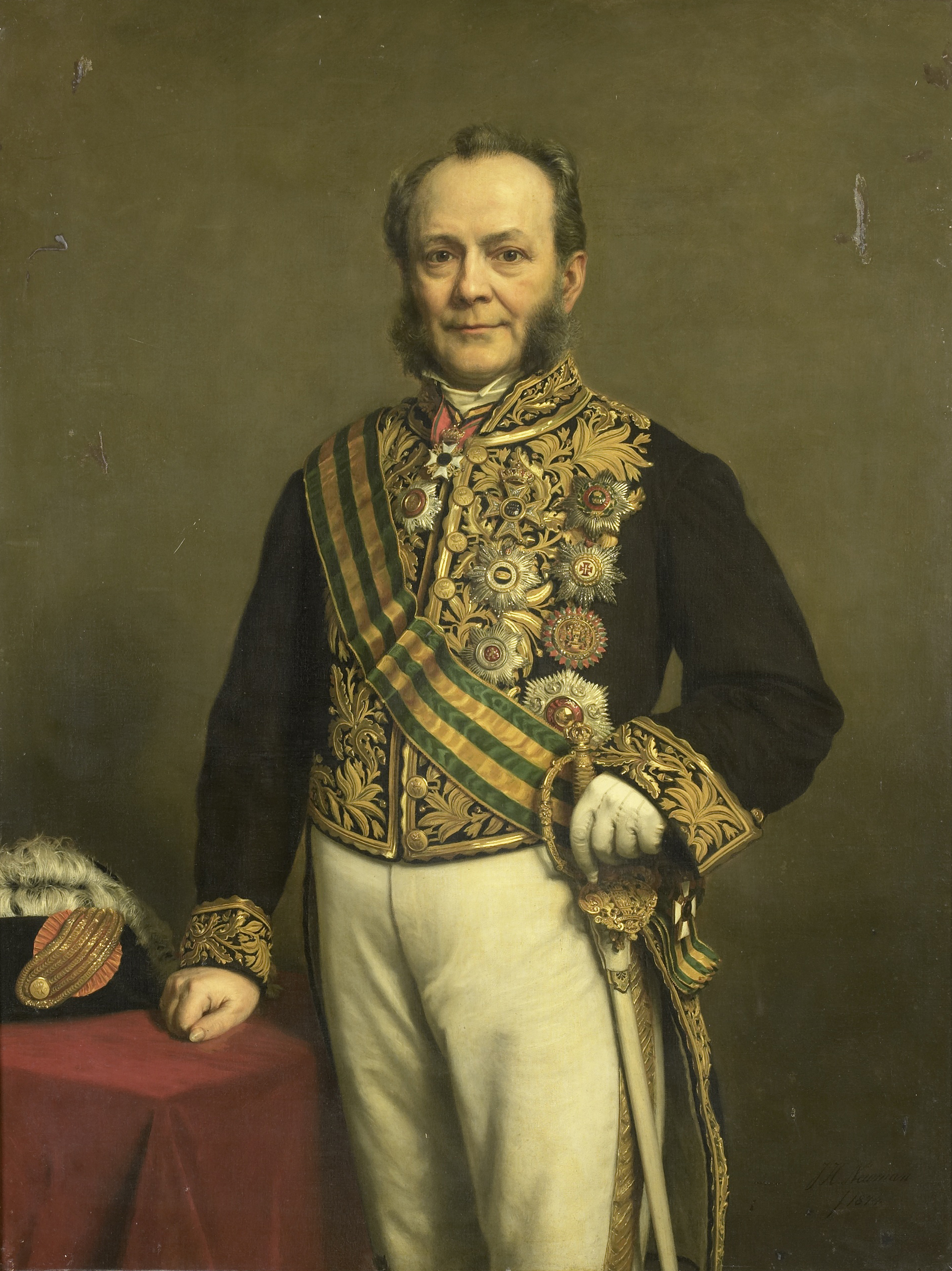
Portrait of Pieter Mijer (1874)

House of Representatives of the Netherlands
Preceded by Bartholomeus Sloet tot Oldhuis	Member for Zwolle; 1860–1866; With: Jacob van Zuylen van Nijevelt 1860–1861; Julius van Zuylen van Nijevelt 1861–1862; Gerrit Abraham de Meester 1862–1864; Gerhard Antony IJssel de Schepper 1864–1866; Henri Wttewaall van Stoetwegen 1866	Succeeded by Thomas Joannes Stieltjes
Political offices
Preceded by Charles Ferdinand Pahud	Minister of Colonial Affairs; 1856–1858	Succeeded by Jan Jacob Rochussen
Preceded by Isaäc Fransen van de Putte	Minister of Colonial Affairs; 1866	Succeeded by Nicolaas Trakranen
Preceded by Ludolph Sloet van de Beele	Governor-General of the Dutch East Indies; 1866–1872	Succeeded by James Loudon
