= Johan Adriaan van der Heim van Duivendijke =

Dutch politician

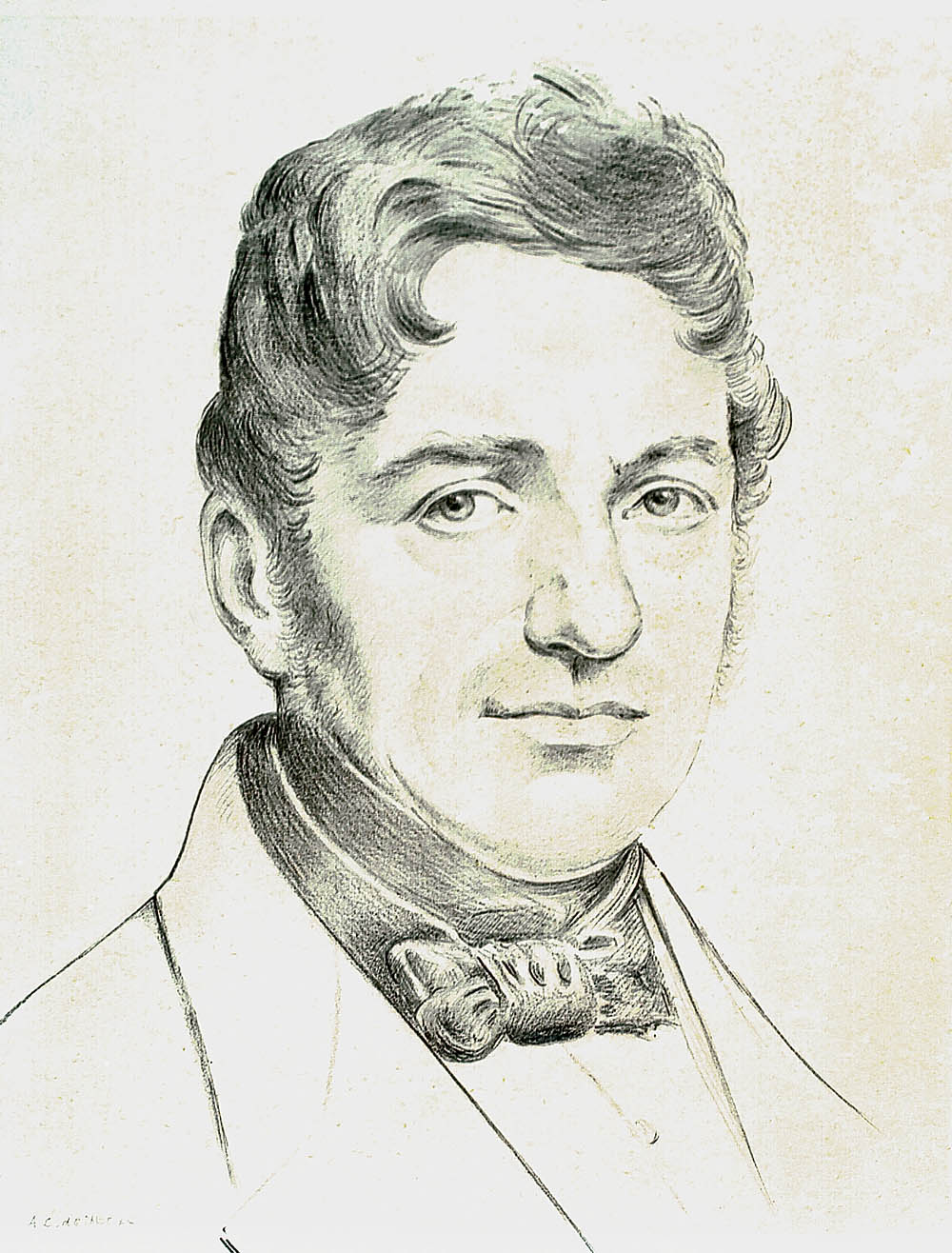
Johan Adriaan van der Heim van Duivendijke

Johan Adriaan, Baron van der Heim van Duivendijke (15 January 1791 – 14 October 1870) was a Dutch politician. He served as minister of finance in 1843, and as minister of the interior in 1848.

Political offices
Preceded by Jan Jacob Rochussen	Minister of Finance; 1843	Succeeded by Baron van Hall
Preceded by Count van Randwijck	Minister of the Interior; 1848	Succeeded by Lodewijk Caspar Luzac
Dutch nobility
New title	Baron van der Heim; 1862–1870	Succeeded by Hendrik Jacob van der Heim
