= Martin Pascal Hubert Strens =

Dutch politician

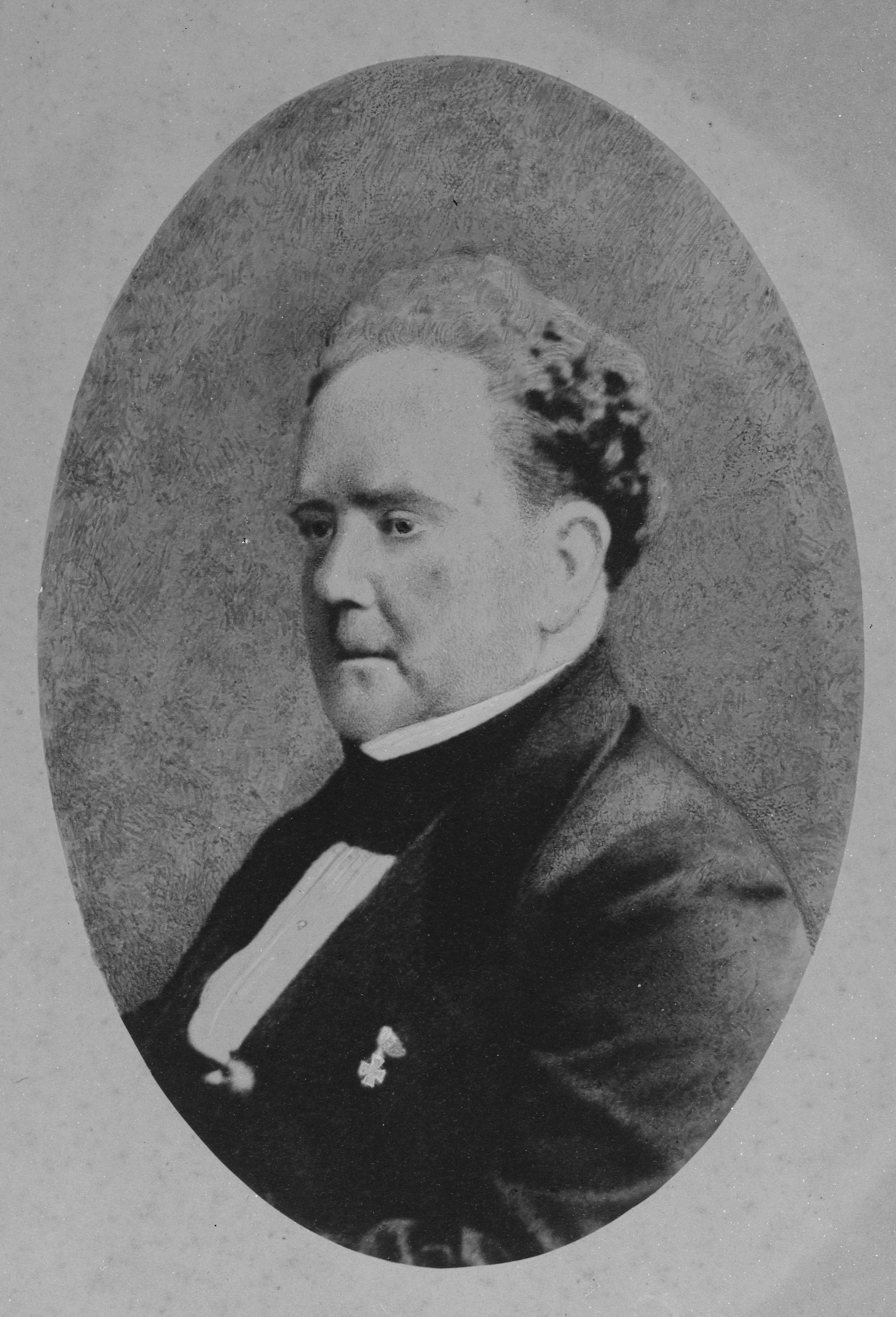
Martin Pascal Hubert Strens

Martin Pascal Hubert Strens (28 March 1807, in Roermond – 22 July 1875, in Maastricht) was a Dutch politician and Ministers of Foreign Affairs of the Netherlands between 1861 and 1862.
