= Charles Ferdinand Pahud =

Dutch politician (1803–1873)

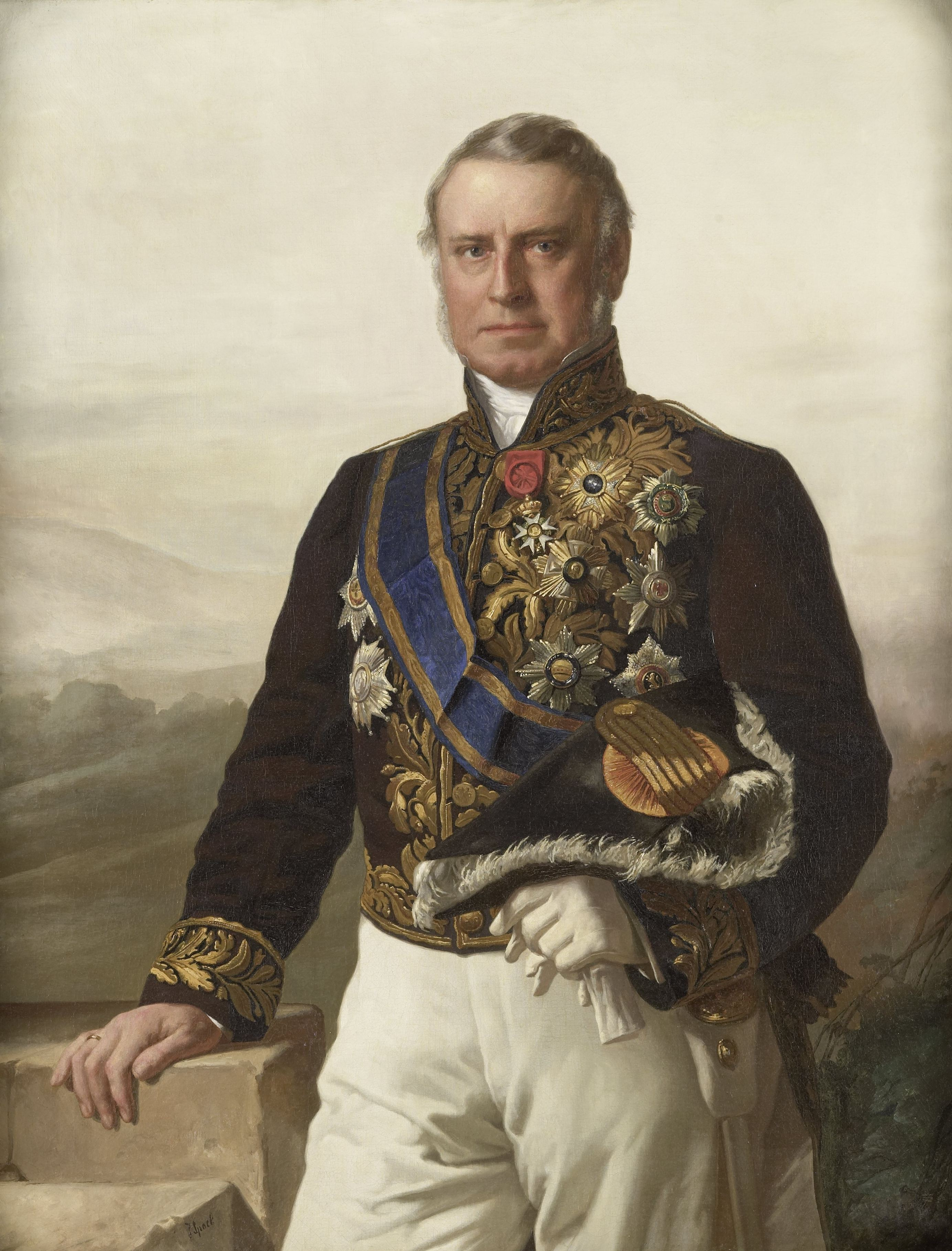

Governor-General of the Dutch East Indies
- In office 22 May 1856 – 2 September 1861
- Monarch: William III
- Preceded by: Albertus Jacobus Duymaer van Twist
- Succeeded by: Ludolph Anne Jan Wilt Sloet van de Beele

Personal details
- Born: 18 April 1803; Amsterdam, Batavian Republic
- Died: 31 August 1873 (aged 70); The Hague, Netherlands

Charles Ferdinand Pahud (18 April 1803 – 31 August 1873) was the Governor-General of the Dutch East Indies in 1856–1861.

Cinchona pahudiana, the variety of C. calisaya introduced to the Dutch East Indies for cultivation as a source of quinine, was named in his honor.

Political offices
Preceded by Albertus Jacobus Duymaer van Twist	Governor-General of the Dutch East Indies; 1856–1861	Succeeded by Ludolph Anne Jan Wilt Sloet van de Beele
