= Floris Adriaan van Hall =

Dutch politician

His Excellency Floris Adriaan van Hall Baron of Hall
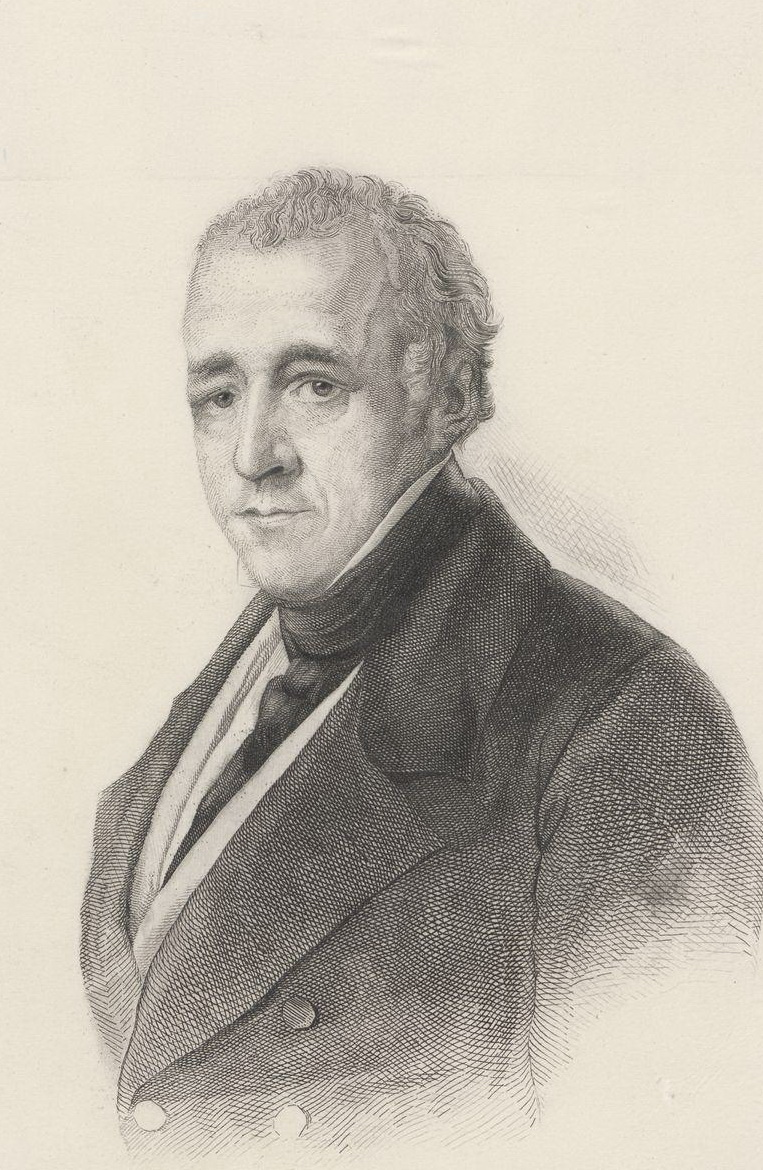

Prime Minister of the Netherlands
- In office 19 April 1853 – 1 July 1856
- Monarch: William III
- Preceded by: Johan Rudolf Thorbecke
- Succeeded by: Justinus Jacob Leonard van Brugghen
- In office 23 February 1860 – 14 March 1861
- Monarch: William III
- Preceded by: Jan Jacob Rochussen
- Succeeded by: Jacob van Zuylen van Nijevelt

Personal details
- Born: 15 May 1791 Amsterdam, Netherlands
- Died: 29 March 1866 (aged 74) The Hague, Netherlands
- Party: Moderate; Conservative Liberal
- Spouses: Pauline Bondt (d. 1845); Henriëtte van der Oye

Floris Adriaan van Hall, Baron of Hall (15 May 1791 – 29 March 1866) was a nobleman and statesman from the Netherlands in the 19th century. He played an important role as representative of the Amsterdam trade and banking sector, and later as politician. He served as Prime Minister of the Netherlands from 1853 to 1856, and again from 1860 to 1861.

== Family ==
Van Hall was born in Amsterdam on 15 May 1791. After the death of his mother, his father had ten more children with her niece, Christina Maria. His father was Maurits Cornelis van Hall, who sat in the First Chamber of the States General and the Representative Body of the Batavian Republic from 1798 to 1801. He was later seated in the States of Holland and in the First Chamber of the States General.

Van Hall was the oldest of six children. He married Alida Paulina (Pauline) Bondt in Amsterdam on 7 July 1815, but she died in 1845. On 30 July 1853, at the age of 62, Van Hall entered a second marriage with Henriëtte Marie Jeanne, Baroness Schimmelpenninck van der Oye. Both marriages remained childless.

== Career ==
Van Hall received primary education from a Walloon preacher in Voorburg, after which he attended a Latin school in Amsterdam. From 1808 to 1811, Van Hall attended the Athenaeum Illustre, and, like his father, studied Roman and Contemporary Law at Leiden University from 7 November 1811 to 22 January 1812.

After he had graduated, he became a lawyer in his father's firm in Amsterdam, where he was primarily concerned with protecting the interests of trading houses and shipping companies. On 3 July 1832, he succeeded his father in the States of Holland for Meerkerk. After the province's split in 1840, he represented the States of North Holland for Amsterdam. On 1 April 1842, King William II appointed him as the successor to Cornelis Felix van Maanen as Minister of Justice, and on 22 September 1843 as Minister of Finance. From 13 February 1849, he sat in the Second Chamber of the States General for the district of Amsterdam, until he succeeded Johan Rudolf Thorbecke as chairman of the Council of Ministers in 1853. On 1 April 1856, King William II gave him the title of Baron, as a token of appreciation for his actions as minister of Foreign Affairs in the Crimean War, where he managed to uphold Dutch neutrality. In 1860, he became chairman of the Council of Ministers once again. He rejected an offer for the appointment to Governor-General of the Dutch East Indies. He died in The Hague, on 29 March 1866.

== Honours ==
- Knight Grand Cross in the Order of the Netherlands Lion.
- Grand Cordon in the Order of Leopold.
- Grand Cross in the Order of the White Falcon

Political offices
Preceded by Cornelis Felix van Maanen	Minister of Justice; 1842–1844	Succeeded by Marinus Willem de Jonge van Campensnieuwland
Preceded by The Baron van der Heim van Duivendijke	Minister of Finance; 1843–1848	Succeeded by Knight van Rappard
Preceded by Leonardus Antonius Lightenvelt	Minister of Roman Catholic Service (interim); 1853	Succeeded by Jacobus Arnoldus Mutsaers
Preceded by Baron van Zuylen van Nijevelt	Minister of Foreign Affairs; 1853–1856	Succeeded by Daniël Théodore Gevers van Endegeest
Preceded by Johan Rudolph Thorbecke	Prime Minister of the Netherlands; 1853–1856	Succeeded by Justinus van der Brugghen
Preceded by Elisa Cornelis Unico van Doorn	Minister of Finance (interim); 1854	Succeeded by Agnites Vrolik
Preceded by Baron van Goltstein	Minister of Foreign Affairs (interim); 1860	Succeeded by The Count van Zuylen van Nijevelt
Preceded by Jan Jacob Rochussen	Prime Minister of the Netherlands; 1860–1861	Succeeded by Baron van Zuylen van Nijevelt
Preceded by Pieter Philip van Bosse	Minister of Finance; 1860–1861	Succeeded by Johannes Servaas Lotsy
