= List of speakers of the House of Representatives (Netherlands) =

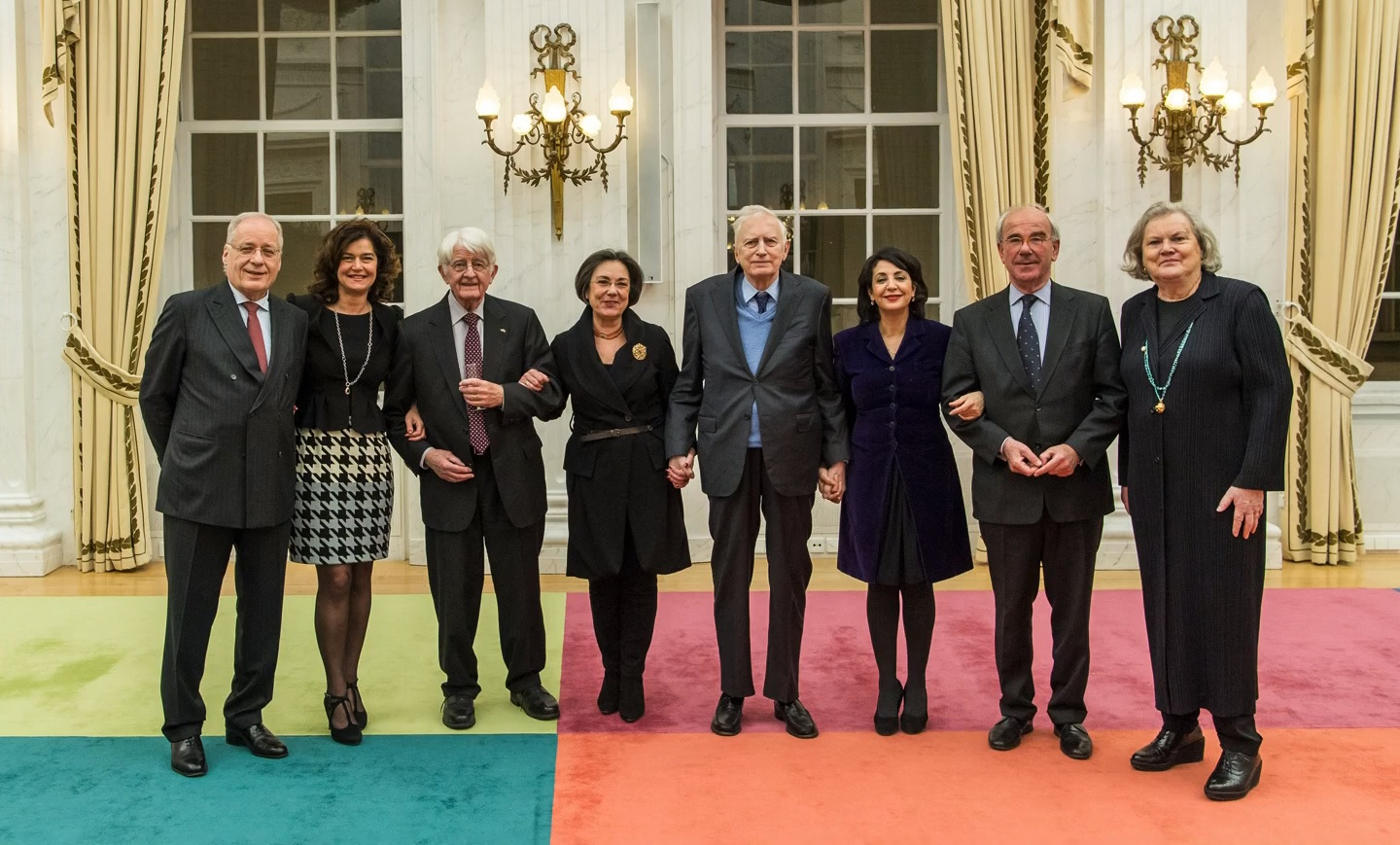
(Former) speakers of the House of Representatives Wim Deetman, Anouchka van Miltenburg, Piet Bukman, Gerdi Verbeet, Dick Dolman, Khadija Arib, Frans Weisglas en Jeltje van Nieuwenhoven in 2017.

This is a list of speakers of the House of Representatives of the Netherlands. Since his election on 18 November 2025, the office has been held by Thom van Campen.

== List of speakers from 1815 to 1881 ==
President	In office	Party	Note(s)
Jan Elias Nicolaas van Lynden van Hoevelaken	September 21, 1815 - October 16, 1816	Independent (Moderate)	
André Charles Membrère	October 23, 1816 - October 20, 1817	Independent (Moderate)	
Jan Pieter van Wickenwoort Crommelin	October 20, 1817 - October 19, 1818	Independent (Moderate)	
Leonard du Bus de Gisignies	October 19, 1818 - October 18, 1819	Independent (Moderate)	
Arnold Hendrik van Markel Bouwer	October 21, 1819 - October 19, 1820	Independent (Moderate)	
André Charles Membrère	October 19, 1820 - October 15, 1821	Independent (Moderate)	
Rutger Metelerkamp	October 31, 1821 - October 24, 1822	Independent (Moderate)	
Pierre Thomas Nicolai	October 24, 1822 - March 29, 1823	Independent (Moderate)	
Samuel Johannes Sandberg van Essenburg	October 16, 1823 - October 21, 1824	Independent (Liberal)	
Pierre Thomas Nicolai	October 21, 1824 - March 5, 1825	Independent (Moderate)	
Samuel Johannes Sandberg van Essenburg	October 16, 1825 - October 20, 1826	Independent (Liberal)	
Lodewijk Aanton Reyphins	October 20, 1826 - October 16, 1827	Independent (Moderate)	
Hendrik Maurits van der Goes	October 18, 1827 - October 20, 1828	Independent (Moderate)	
Lodewijk Aanton Reyphins	October 20, 1828 - October 20, 1829	Independent (Moderate)	
Jan Corver Hooft	October 22, 1829 - September 13, 1830	Independent (Moderate)	
Lodewijk van Toulon	September 13, 1830 - October 13, 1831	Independent (Moderate)	
Hubert van Asch van Wijck	October 13, 1831 - October 16, 1832	Independent (Ultra-conservative)	
Hendrik Collot d'Escury	October 20, 1832 - October 18, 1833	Independent (Moderate)	
Tammo Sypkens	October 21, 1833 - October 16, 1834	Independent (Ultra-conservative)	
Hendrik Collot d'Escury	October 16, 1834 - October 20, 1835	Independent (Moderate)	
Herman Jacob Dijkmester	October 20, 1835 - October 18, 1836	Independent (Moderate)	
Lodewijk Caspar Luzac	October 18, 1836 - October 16, 1837	Independent (Liberal)	
Mauritz Pico Diederik van Sytzama	October 18, 1837 - October 15, 1838	Independent (Moderate)	
Marinus Willem de Jonge van Campensnieuwland	October 16, 1838 - October 21, 1839	Independent (Ultra-conservative)	
Oncko van Svinderen van Rensuma	October 21, 1839 - October 20, 1840	Independent (Conservative)	
Hendrick Backer	October 20, 1840 - October 20, 1841	Independent (Moderate)	
Edmond Willem van Dam van Isselt	October 20, 1841 - October 18, 1842	Independent (Liberal)	
Daniël Théodore Gevers van Endegeest	October 18, 1842 - October 16, 1843	Independent (Conservative)	
Johannes Luyben	October 21, 1843 - October 22, 1844	Independent (Conservative)	
Pieter van Akerlaken	October 22, 1844 - October 20, 1845	Independent (Conservative)	
George Isaäc Bruce	October 24, 1844 - October 20, 1845	Independent (Moderate)	
Willem Boreel van Hogelanden	October 20, 1847 - February 13, 1849	Independent (Conservative liberal)	
Jan Karel van Goltstein	February 19, 1849 - August 20, 1850	Independent (Conservative liberal)	
Albertus Jacobus Duymaer van Twist	October 12, 1850 - January 22, 1851	Independent (Liberal)	
Willem Boreel van Hogelanden	February 21, 1851 - September 17, 1852	Independent (Conservative liberal)	
Willem Hendrik Dullert	September 24, 1852 - April 26, 1853	Independent (Liberal)	
Willem Boreel van Hogelanden	June 20, 1853 - August 22, 1855	Independent (Conservative liberal)	
Daniël Théodore Gevers van Endegeest	September 20, 1855 - July 4, 1856	Independent (Conservative)	
Jan Karel van Goltstein	September 19, 1856 - March 11, 1858	Independent (Conservative liberal)	
Willem Anne Schimmelpenninck van der Oye	April 17, 1858 - August 27, 1858	Independent (Conservative)	
Gerlach Cornelis Joannes van Reenen	September 23, 1858 - September 20, 1869	Independent (Conservative)	
Willem Hendrik Dullert	September 23, 1869 - February 24, 1881	Independent (Liberal)	
Charles Jean François Mirandolle	March 4, 1881 - September 19, 1881	Independent (Liberal)	

== List of speakers of the House of Representatives since 1881 ==
Speaker of the House of Representatives		Term of office	Party(s)	Parliamentary period
Otto van Rees	Otto van Rees (1823–1892)	22 September 1881 – 20 January 1884 (2 years, 120 days)^{[App]}	Independent; Conservative Liberal	1883–1883
Otto van Rees	Otto van Rees (1823–1892)	22 September 1881 – 20 January 1884 (2 years, 120 days)^{[App]}	Independent; Conservative Liberal	1883–1884
Eppo Cremers	Eppo Cremers (1823–1896)	12 February 1884 – 17 November 1884 (279 days)^{[Ret]}	Independent; Classical Liberal	1883–1884
Aeneas Mackay Jr.	Baron; Aeneas Mackay Jr. (1838–1909)	17 November 1884 – 24 September 1885 (311 days)^{[Res]}	Anti-Revolutionary; Party	1884–1885
Eppo Cremers	Eppo Cremers (1823–1896)	24 September 1885 – 27 March 1888 (2 years, 185 days)^{[Ret]}	Independent; Classical Liberal	1884–1885
Eppo Cremers	Eppo Cremers (1823–1896)	24 September 1885 – 27 March 1888 (2 years, 185 days)^{[Ret]}	Independent; Classical Liberal	1886–1887
Eppo Cremers	Eppo Cremers (1823–1896)	24 September 1885 – 27 March 1888 (2 years, 185 days)^{[Ret]}	Independent; Classical Liberal	1887–1888
Gerard Beelaerts van Blokland	Jonkheer; Gerard Beelaerts van Blokland (1843–1897)	7 May 1888 – 15 September 1891 (3 years, 131 days)^{[Ret]}	Independent; Christian Democratic; Protestant	1888–1891
Johan George Gleichman	Johan George; Gleichman (1834–1904)	18 September 1891 – 17 June 1901 (9 years, 272 days)^{[Ret]}	Liberal Union	1891–1894
Johan George Gleichman	Johan George; Gleichman (1834–1904)	18 September 1891 – 17 June 1901 (9 years, 272 days)^{[Ret]}	Liberal Union	1894–1897
Johan George Gleichman	Johan George; Gleichman (1834–1904)	18 September 1891 – 17 June 1901 (9 years, 272 days)^{[Ret]}	Liberal Union	1897–1901
Aeneas Mackay Jr.	Baron; Aeneas Mackay Jr. (1838–1909)	20 September 1901 – 19 September 1905 (3 years, 364 days)^{[Ret]}	Anti-Revolutionary; Party	1901–1905
Joan Röell	Jonkheer; Joan Röell (1844–1914)	22 September 1905 – 21 September 1909 (3 years, 364 days)^{[Ret]}	Independent; Conservative Liberal (until 1906)	1905–1909
Joan Röell	Jonkheer; Joan Röell (1844–1914)	22 September 1905 – 21 September 1909 (3 years, 364 days)^{[Ret]}	League of Free Liberals (from 1906)	1905–1909
Frederik van Bylandt	Count; Frederik van Bylandt (1841–1941)	23 September 1909 – 15 September 1912 (2 years, 358 days)^{[Res]}	Christian; Historical Union	1909–1913
Octaaf van Nispen tot Sevenaer	Jonkheer; Octaaf van Nispen tot Sevenaer (1867–1956)	18 September 1912 – 16 September 1913 (363 days)^{[Ret]}	Roman Catholic; State Party	1909–1913
Hendrik Goeman Borgesius	Dr. Hendrik Goeman; Borgesius (1847–1917)	17 September 1913 – 18 January 1917 (3 years, 123 days)^{[Ret]}	Liberal Union	1913–1917
Dirk Fock	Dr. Dirk Fock (1858–1941)	25 January 1917 – 8 October 1920 (3 years, 257 days)^{[App]}	Liberal Union	1917–1918
Dirk Fock	Dr. Dirk Fock (1858–1941)	25 January 1917 – 8 October 1920 (3 years, 257 days)^{[App]}	Liberal Union	1918–1922
Dionysius Koolen	Dr. Dionysius Koolen (1871–1945)	14 October 1920 – 5 August 1925 (4 years, 295 days)^{[Ret]}	General League of Roman; Catholic Caucuses	1918–1922
Dionysius Koolen	Dr. Dionysius Koolen (1871–1945)	14 October 1920 – 5 August 1925 (4 years, 295 days)^{[Ret]}	General League of Roman; Catholic Caucuses	1922–1925
Charles Ruijs de Beerenbrouck	Jonkheer; Charles Ruijs de Beerenbrouck (1873–1936)	17 September 1925 – 10 August 1929 (3 years, 319 days)^{[App]}	Roman Catholic; State Party	1925–1929
Josef van Schaik	Josef van Schaik (1882–1962)	18 September 1929 – 26 May 1933 (3 years, 250 days)^{[App]}	Roman Catholic; State Party	1929–1933
Charles Ruijs de Beerenbrouck	Jonkheer; Charles Ruijs de Beerenbrouck (1873–1936)	31 May 1933 – 17 April 1936 (2 years, 319 days)^{[Died]}	Roman Catholic; State Party	1933–1937
Piet Aalberse	Piet Aalberse (1871–1948)	7 May 1936 – 9 November 1937 (1 year, 186 days)^{[Ret]}	Roman Catholic; State Party	1933–1937
Josef van Schaik	Josef van Schaik (1882–1962)	11 November 1937 – 7 August 1948 (10 years, 270 days)^{[App]}	Roman Catholic; State Party	1937–1946
Josef van Schaik	Josef van Schaik (1882–1962)	11 November 1937 – 7 August 1948 (10 years, 270 days)^{[App]}	Catholic; People's Party	1946–1948
Rad Kortenhorst	Dr. Rad Kortenhorst (1886–1963)	12 August 1948 – 13 January 1963 (14 years, 154 days)^{[Died]}	Catholic; People's Party	1948–1952
Rad Kortenhorst	Dr. Rad Kortenhorst (1886–1963)	12 August 1948 – 13 January 1963 (14 years, 154 days)^{[Died]}	Catholic; People's Party	1952–1956
Rad Kortenhorst	Dr. Rad Kortenhorst (1886–1963)	12 August 1948 – 13 January 1963 (14 years, 154 days)^{[Died]}	Catholic; People's Party	1956–1959
Rad Kortenhorst	Dr. Rad Kortenhorst (1886–1963)	12 August 1948 – 13 January 1963 (14 years, 154 days)^{[Died]}	Catholic; People's Party	1959–1963
Frans-Jozef van Thiel	Frans-Jozef van Thiel (1906–1993)	29 January 1963 – 7 December 1972 (9 years, 313 days)^{[Ret]}	Catholic; People's Party	1959–1963
Frans-Jozef van Thiel	Frans-Jozef van Thiel (1906–1993)	29 January 1963 – 7 December 1972 (9 years, 313 days)^{[Ret]}	Catholic; People's Party	1963–1967
Frans-Jozef van Thiel	Frans-Jozef van Thiel (1906–1993)	29 January 1963 – 7 December 1972 (9 years, 313 days)^{[Ret]}	Catholic; People's Party	1967–1971
Frans-Jozef van Thiel	Frans-Jozef van Thiel (1906–1993)	29 January 1963 – 7 December 1972 (9 years, 313 days)^{[Ret]}	Catholic; People's Party	1971–1972
Anne Vondeling	Dr. Anne Vondeling (1916–1979)	7 December 1972 – 17 July 1979 (6 years, 222 days)^{[Res]}	Labour Party	1972–1977
Anne Vondeling	Dr. Anne Vondeling (1916–1979)	7 December 1972 – 17 July 1979 (6 years, 222 days)^{[Res]}	Labour Party	1977–1981
Dick Dolman	Dr. Dick Dolman (1935–2019)	17 July 1979 – 14 September 1989 (10 years, 59 days)^{[Lost]}	Labour Party	1977–1981
Dick Dolman	Dr. Dick Dolman (1935–2019)	17 July 1979 – 14 September 1989 (10 years, 59 days)^{[Lost]}	Labour Party	1981–1982
Dick Dolman	Dr. Dick Dolman (1935–2019)	17 July 1979 – 14 September 1989 (10 years, 59 days)^{[Lost]}	Labour Party	1982–1986
Dick Dolman	Dr. Dick Dolman (1935–2019)	17 July 1979 – 14 September 1989 (10 years, 59 days)^{[Lost]}	Labour Party	1986–1989
Wim Deetman	Wim Deetman (born 1945)	14 September 1989 – 1 December 1996 (7 years, 78 days)^{[App]}	Christian; Democratic Appeal	1989–1994
Wim Deetman	Wim Deetman (born 1945)	14 September 1989 – 1 December 1996 (7 years, 78 days)^{[App]}	Christian; Democratic Appeal	1994–1998
Piet Bukman	Piet Bukman (1934–2022)	3 December 1996 – 19 May 1998 (1 year, 167 days)^{[Ret]}	Christian; Democratic Appeal	1994–1998
Jeltje van Nieuwenhoven	Jeltje van Nieuwenhoven (born 1943)	20 May 1998 – 16 May 2002 (3 years, 361 days)^{[App]}	Labour Party	1998–2002
Frans Weisglas	Frans Weisglas (born 1946)	28 May 2002 – 30 November 2006 (4 years, 186 days)^{[Ret]}	People's Party for Freedom and Democracy	2002–2003
Frans Weisglas	Frans Weisglas (born 1946)	28 May 2002 – 30 November 2006 (4 years, 186 days)^{[Ret]}	People's Party for Freedom and Democracy	2003–2006
Gerdi Verbeet	Gerdi Verbeet (born 1951)	6 December 2006 – 20 September 2012 (5 years, 294 days)^{[Ret]}	Labour Party	2006–2010
Gerdi Verbeet	Gerdi Verbeet (born 1951)	6 December 2006 – 20 September 2012 (5 years, 294 days)^{[Ret]}	Labour Party	2010–2012
Anouchka van Miltenburg	Anouchka van Miltenburg (born 1967)	25 September 2012 – 12 December 2015 (3 years, 78 days)^{[Res]}	People's Party for Freedom and Democracy	2012–2017
Khadija Arib	Khadija Arib (born 1960)	13 January 2016 – 7 April 2021 (5 years, 84 days)^{[Lost]}	Labour Party	2012–2017
Khadija Arib	Khadija Arib (born 1960)	13 January 2016 – 7 April 2021 (5 years, 84 days)^{[Lost]}	Labour Party	2017–2021
Vera Bergkamp	Vera Bergkamp (born 1971)	7 April 2021 – 5 December 2023 (2 years, 242 days)	Democrats 66	2021–2023
Martin Bosma	Martin Bosma (born 1964)	14 December 2023 – 18 November 2025 (1 year, 339 days)	Party for Freedom	2023–2025
	Thom van Campen (born 1990)	18 November 2025 – Incumbent (251 days)	People's Party for Freedom and Democracy	2025–present

^{Resigned}
^{Died in office}
^{Retired}
^{Lost re-election}
^{Resigned following election to the European Parliament}
^{Appointed as Governor-General of the Dutch East Indies}
^{Appointed as Prime Minister}
^{Appointed as Minister of Justice}
^{Appointed as Deputy Prime Minister}
^{Appointed as Mayor of The Hague}
^{Appointed as Parliamentary leader of the Labour Party}

== See also ==
- List of presidents of the Senate of the Netherlands
- List of Speaker of the House of Representatives elections (Netherlands)
