= List of Speaker of the Dutch House of Representatives elections =

Since 1983, an election for Speaker of the House of Representatives is held when the House first convenes after a general election, or when a sitting speaker dies, resigns, or is removed from the position. Before 1983, a new Speaker was chosen at the start of every parliamentary year by the monarch, who usually selected the nominee put forward by the House.

== 1986 ==
Candidate	Party	Votes	%
Dick Dolman (incumbent)	Labour Party	125	84.46
Piet van der Sanden	Christian Democratic Appeal	13	8.78
Klaas de Vries (write-in)	Labour Party	2	1.35
Wim Kok (write-in)	Labour Party	1	0.68
Wim Meijer (write-in)	Labour Party	1	0.68
Ien Dales (write-in)	Labour Party	1	0.68
Piet Stoffelen (write-in)	Labour Party	1	0.68
Rob Tazelaar (write-in)	Labour Party	1	0.68
Kees van Dijk (write-in)	Christian Democratic Appeal	1	0.68
Huib Eversdijk (write-in)	Christian Democratic Appeal	1	0.68
Theo Joekes (write-in)	People's Party for Freedom and Democracy	1	0.68
Total		148	100.00
Valid votes		148	99.33
Invalid/blank votes		1	0.67
Total votes		149	100.00
Source: Nederlands Dagblad

== 1989 ==
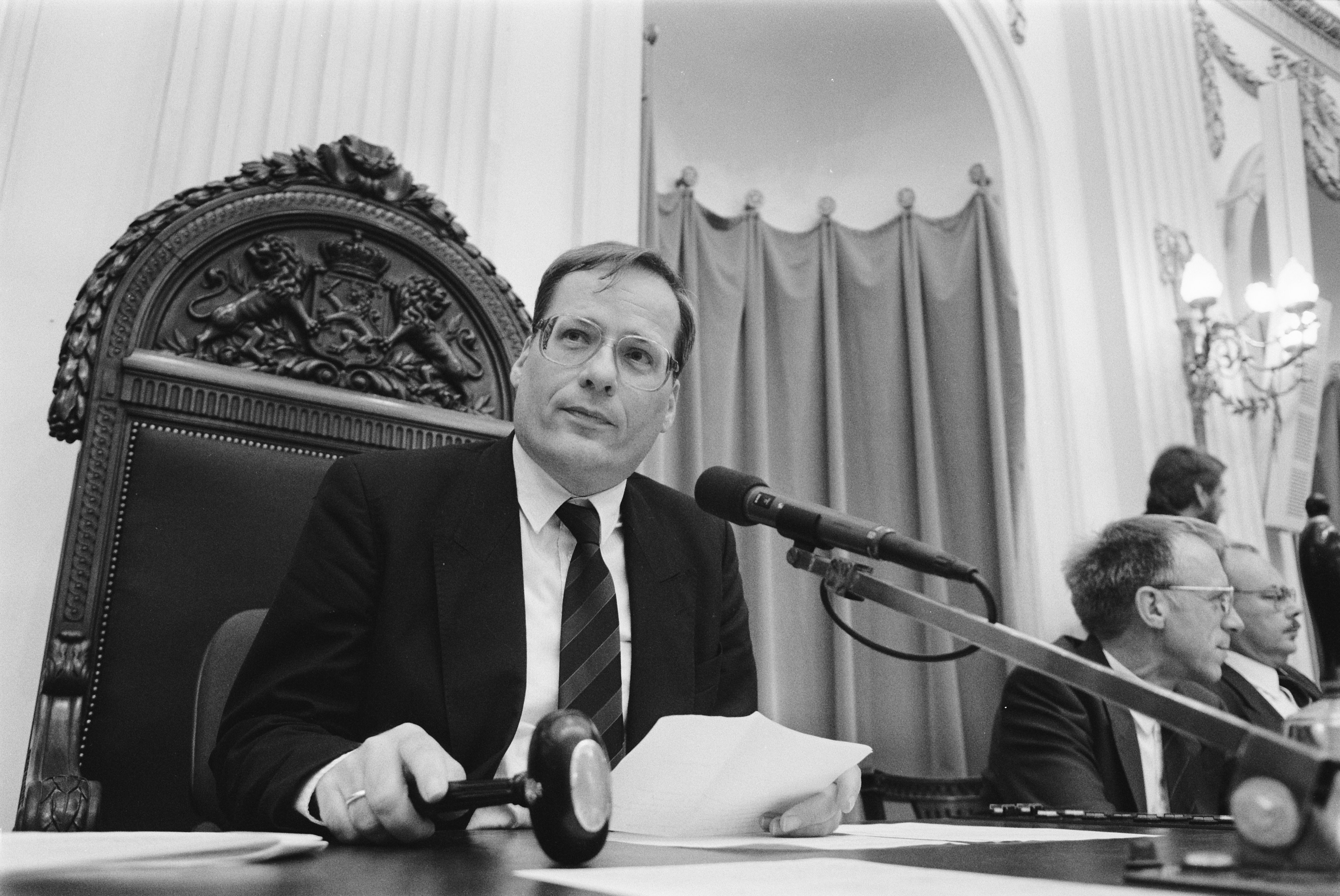
Wim Deetman as Speaker on the day of his election on 14 September 1989.

Candidate	Party	Votes	%
Wim Deetman	Christian Democratic Appeal	75	51.37
Dick Dolman (incumbent)	Labour Party	68	46.58
Huib Eversdijk (write-in)	Christian Democratic Appeal	3	2.05
Total		146	100.00
Valid votes		146	97.33
Invalid/blank votes		4	2.67
Total votes		150	100.00
Source: Het Parool

== 1994 ==
Candidate	Party	Votes	%
Wim Deetman (incumbent)	Christian Democratic Appeal	137	99.28
Flip Buurmeijer (write-in)	Labour Party	1	0.72
Total		138	100.00
Valid votes		138	98.57
Invalid/blank votes		2	1.43
Total votes		140	100.00
Source: Algemeen Dagblad

== 1996 ==
Candidate	Party	Votes	%
Piet Bukman	Christian Democratic Appeal	85	64.39
Ali Doelman-Pel	Labour Party	45	34.09
Jeltje van Nieuwenhoven (write-in)	Labour Party	1	0.76
Gert Schutte (write-in)	Reformed Political League	1	0.76
Total		132	100.00
Valid votes		132	97.78
Invalid/blank votes		3	2.22
Total votes		135	100.00
Source: Algemeen Dagblad

== 1998 ==
Candidate	Party	Votes	%
Jeltje van Nieuwenhoven	Labour Party	99	71.74
Martin Zijlstra	Labour Party	19	13.77
Tineke Netelenbos	Labour Party	17	12.32
Gert Schutte	Reformed Political League	2	1.45
Pieter Jan Biesheuvel	Christian Democratic Appeal	1	0.72
Total		138	100.00
Valid votes		138	98.57
Invalid/blank votes		2	1.43
Total votes		140	100.00
Source: DNPP Yearbook, Handelingen

== 2002 ==
Candidate	Party	Votes	%
Frans Weisglas	People's Party for Freedom and Democracy	80	55.17
Annemarie Jorritsma	People's Party for Freedom and Democracy	41	28.28
Jim Janssen van Raaij	Pim Fortuyn List	24	16.55
Total		145	100.00
Source: Algemeen Dagblad

== 2003 ==
Candidate	Party	First round		Second round	
Candidate	Party	Votes	%	Votes	%
Frans Weisglas (incumbent)	People's Party for Freedom and Democracy	61	42.07	79	54.48
Gerda Verburg	Christian Democratic Appeal	47	32.41	49	33.79
Thom de Graaf	Democrats 66	37	25.52	17	11.72
Total		145	100.00	145	100.00
Valid votes		145	100.00	145	100.00
Invalid/blank votes		0	0.00	0	0.00
Total votes		145	100.00	145	100.00
Source: Handelingen

== 2006 ==
Candidate	Party	First round		Second round		Third round	
Candidate	Party	Votes	%	Votes	%	Votes	%
Gerdi Verbeet	Labour Party	53	36.81	52	35.62	78	54.17
Maria van der Hoeven	Christian Democratic Appeal	47	32.64	54	36.99	66	45.83
Henk Kamp	People's Party for Freedom and Democracy	44	30.56	40	27.40		
Total		144	100.00	146	100.00	144	100.00
Valid votes		144	98.63	146	100.00	144	98.63
Invalid/blank votes		2	1.37	0	0.00	2	1.37
Total votes		146	100.00	146	100.00	146	100.00
Source: De Volkskrant

== 2010 ==
Candidate	Party	Votes	%
Gerdi Verbeet (incumbent)	Labour Party	94	63.51
Charlie Aptroot	People's Party for Freedom and Democracy	54	36.49
Total		148	100.00
Valid votes		148	100.00
Invalid/blank votes		0	0.00
Total votes		148	100.00
Source: NOS

== 2012 ==
Candidate	Party	First round		Second round		Third round	
Candidate	Party	Votes	%	Votes	%	Votes	%
Anouchka van Miltenburg	People's Party for Freedom and Democracy	63	42.57	64	43.24	90	61.64
Khadija Arib	Labour Party	45	30.41	44	29.73	56	38.36
Gerard Schouw	Democrats 66	40	27.03	40	27.03		
Total		148	100.00	148	100.00	146	100.00
Valid votes		148	100.00	148	100.00	146	98.65
Invalid/blank votes		0	0.00	0	0.00	2	1.35
Total votes		148	100.00	148	100.00	148	100.00
Source: NOS, Handelingen

== 2016 ==
Candidate	Party	First round		Second round		Third round		Fourth round	
Candidate	Party	Votes	%	Votes	%	Votes	%	Votes	%
Khadija Arib	Labour Party	58	39.73	56	37.84	60	40.82	83	61.94
Ton Elias	People's Party for Freedom and Democracy	40	27.40	43	29.05	44	29.93	51	38.06
Madeleine van Toorenburg	Christian Democratic Appeal	30	20.55	34	22.97	32	21.77		
Martin Bosma	Party for Freedom	16	10.96	13	8.78	11	7.48		
Roos Vermeij (write-in)	Labour Party	2	1.37	2	1.35				
Total		146	100.00	148	100.00	147	100.00	134	100.00
Valid votes		146	97.99	148	99.33	147	98.66	134	89.93
Invalid/blank votes		3	2.01	1	0.67	2	1.34	15	10.07
Total votes		149	100.00	149	100.00	149	100.00	149	100.00
Source: NOS, Handelingen

== 2017 ==
Candidate	Party	Votes	%
Khadija Arib (incumbent)	Labour Party	111	90.98
Martin Bosma (write-in)	Party for Freedom	9	7.38
Stientje van Veldhoven (write-in)	Democrats 66	1	0.82
Roelof Bisschop (write-in)	Reformed Political Party	1	0.82
Total		122	100.00
Valid votes		122	86.52
Invalid/blank votes		19	13.48
Total votes		141	100.00
Source: NOS

== 2021 ==
Candidate	Party	Votes	%
Vera Bergkamp	Democrats 66	74	53.24
Khadija Arib (incumbent)	Labour Party	38	27.34
Martin Bosma	Party for Freedom	27	19.42
Total		139	100.00
Valid votes		139	96.53
Invalid/blank votes		5	3.47
Total votes		144	100.00
Source: NOS

== 2023 ==
Candidate	Party	First round		Second round	
Candidate	Party	Votes	%	Votes	%
Martin Bosma	Party for Freedom	71	48.97	75	51.37
Tom van der Lee	GroenLinks–PvdA	61	42.07	66	45.21
Roelien Kamminga (write-in)	People's Party for Freedom and Democracy	12	8.28	5	3.42
Raymond de Roon (write-in)	Party for Freedom	1	0.69	0	0.00
Total		145	100.00	146	100.00
Valid votes		145	97.97	146	98.65
Invalid/blank votes		3	2.03	2	1.35
Total votes		148	100.00	148	100.00
Source: NOS, Handelingen

== 2025 ==
Candidate	Party	First round		Second round		Third round	
Candidate	Party	Votes	%	Votes	%	Votes	%
Thom van Campen	People's Party for Freedom and Democracy	39	26.35	49	33.11	79	53.38
Martin Bosma (incumbent)	Party for Freedom	66	44.59	67	45.27	69	46.62
Tom van der Lee	GroenLinks–PvdA	43	29.05	32	21.62		
Total		148	100.00	148	100.00	148	100.00
Source: AD

== See also ==
- List of speakers of the House of Representatives (Netherlands)
