= List of members of the House of Representatives of the Netherlands, 2003–2006 =

House of Representatives, 2003–2006
←	2002–2003	2006–2010	→
- Composition of the House of Representatives at the start of the term.

Overview
- Legislative body: House of Representatives
- Meeting place: Binnenhof
- Term: 30 January 2003 – 29 November 2006
- Election: 2003
- Government: Second Balkenende cabinet CDA: 44 VVD: 28 D66: 6
- Opposition: PvdA: 42 SP: 9 LPF: 8 GL: 8 CU: 3 SGP: 2
- Members: 150
- Speaker of the House of Representatives: Frans Weisglas

Between 30 January 2003 and 29 November 2006, 187 individuals served as representatives in the House of Representatives, the 150-seat lower house of the States-General of the Netherlands. 150 representatives were elected in the 22 January 2003 general election and installed at the start of the term; 37 representatives were appointed as replacements when elected representatives resigned or went on leave.

After the election, the second Balkenende cabinet was formed from a coalition of the Christian Democratic Appeal (CDA, 44 seats), People's Party for Freedom and Democracy (VVD, 28 seats) and Democrats 66 (D66, 6 seats). The opposition consisted of the Labour Party (PvdA, 42 seats), Socialist Party (SP, 9 seats), Pim Fortuyn List (LPF, 8 seats), GroenLinks (GL, 8 seats), Christian Union (CU, 3 seats) and Reformed Political Party (SGP, 2 seats).

== Members ==
All members are sworn in at the start of the term, even if they are not new. Assumed office in this list therefore refers to the swearing in during this term (or return date of members who left), while all members are automatically considered to have left office at the end of the term.

Members of the House of Representatives of the Netherlands, 2003–2006
Name	Parliamentary group	Assumed office	Left office	Ref.
Jozias van Aartsen	VVD	30 January 2003	29 November 2006	
Ine Aasted-Madsen	CDA	21 May 2003	29 November 2006	
Karin Adelmund	PvdA	30 January 2003	21 October 2005 (Note: Died in office)	
Nebahat Albayrak	PvdA	30 January 2003	29 November 2006	
Rendert Algra	CDA	30 January 2003	29 November 2006	
Ayaan Hirsi Ali	VVD	30 January 2003	16 May 2006 (Note: Left for political reasons)	
Charlie Aptroot	VVD	30 January 2003	29 November 2006	
Agnes van Ardenne	CDA	30 January 2003	27 May 2003 (Note: Left to join the cabinet)	
Khadija Arib	PvdA	30 January 2003	29 November 2006	
Gerard van As	LPF	30 January 2003	12 September 2006	
Joop Atsma	CDA	30 January 2003	29 November 2006	
Naïma Azough	GL	16 March 2004	29 November 2006	
Hans van Baalen	VVD	30 January 2003	29 November 2006	
Bert Bakker	D66	30 January 2003	29 November 2006	
Eric Balemans	VVD	3 June 2003	29 November 2006	
Jan Peter Balkenende	CDA	30 January 2003	27 May 2003	
Willibrord van Beek	VVD	30 January 2003	29 November 2006	
Stef Blok	VVD	30 January 2003	29 November 2006	
Luuk Blom	PvdA	30 January 2003	29 November 2006	
Bas Jan van Bochove	CDA	30 January 2003	29 November 2006	
Jan Boelhouwer	PvdA	30 January 2003	29 November 2006	
Harry van Bommel	SP	30 January 2003	29 November 2006	
Wouter Bos	PvdA	30 January 2003	29 November 2006	
Arie van den Brand	GL	30 January 2003	9 March 2004 (Note: Left for health reasons)	
Wien van den Brink	LPF	30 January 2003	29 November 2006	
Theo Brinkel	CDA	3 June 2003	29 November 2006	
Hubert Bruls	CDA	30 January 2003	10 October 2005 (Note: Left to become mayor of Venlo)	
Siem Buijs	CDA	30 January 2003	29 November 2006	
Jet Bussemaker	PvdA	30 January 2003	29 November 2006	
Wim van de Camp	CDA	30 January 2003	29 November 2006	
Clemens Cornielje	VVD	30 January 2003	30 August 2005 (Note: Left to become Queen's Commissioner of Gelderland)	
Coşkun Çörüz	CDA	30 January 2003	29 November 2006	
Ferd Crone	PvdA	30 January 2003	29 November 2006	
Martijn van Dam	PvdA	30 January 2003	29 November 2006	
Staf Depla	PvdA	30 January 2003	29 November 2006	
Ineke Dezentjé Hamming-Bluemink	VVD	3 June 2003	29 November 2006	
Jan Jacob van Dijk	CDA	3 June 2003	29 November 2006	
Marjo van Dijken	PvdA	30 January 2003	29 November 2006	
Sharon Dijksma	PvdA	30 January 2003	29 November 2006	
Jeroen Dijsselbloem	PvdA	30 January 2003	29 November 2006	
Boris Dittrich	D66	30 January 2003	29 November 2006	
Kris Douma	PvdA	30 January 2003	29 November 2006	
Niesco Dubbelboer	PvdA	30 January 2003	29 November 2006	
Adri Duivesteijn	PvdA	30 January 2003	30 May 2006 (Note: Left to become alderman in Almere)	
Wijnand Duyvendak	GL	30 January 2003	29 November 2006	
Joost Eerdmans	LPF (Note: Until 25 September 2006)	30 January 2003	29 November 2006	
Joost Eerdmans	Eerdmans/Van Schijndel (Note: Starting 25 September 2006)	30 January 2003	29 November 2006	
Eske van Egerschot	VVD	6 April 2004	29 November 2006	
Angelien Eijsink	PvdA	30 January 2003	29 November 2006	
Nihat Eski	CDA	3 June 2003	29 November 2006	
Camiel Eurlings	CDA	30 January 2003	19 July 2004 (Note: Left to join the European Parliament)	
Kathleen Ferrier	CDA	30 January 2003	29 November 2006	
Wim van Fessem	CDA	3 June 2003	29 November 2006	
Thea Fierens	PvdA	30 January 2003	29 November 2006	
Pieter van Geel	CDA	30 January 2003	27 May 2003	
Jan Geluk	VVD	30 January 2003	29 June 2005 (Note: Left to become dijkgraaf of Waterschap Hollandse Delta)	
Ineke van Gent	GL	30 January 2003	29 November 2006	
Arda Gerkens	SP	30 January 2003	29 November 2006	
Francine Giskes	D66	30 January 2003	7 September 2004 (Note: Left for personal reasons)	
Thom de Graaf	D66	30 January 2003	27 May 2003	
Frank de Grave	VVD	30 January 2003	31 March 2004 (Note: Left to chair the Health Service Tariff Tribunal)	
Laetitia Griffith	VVD	30 January 2003	2 June 2005 (Note: Left to become alderwoman in Amsterdam)	
Laetitia Griffith	VVD	1 June 2006	29 November 2006	
Henk de Haan	CDA	30 January 2003	29 November 2006	
Sybrand van Haersma Buma	CDA	30 January 2003	29 November 2006	
Femke Halsema	GL	30 January 2003	29 November 2006	
Boris van der Ham	D66	30 January 2003	29 November 2006	
Mariëtte Hamer	PvdA	30 January 2003	29 November 2006	
Maarten Haverkamp	CDA	30 January 2003	29 November 2006	
Frank Heemskerk	PvdA	30 January 2003	29 November 2006	
Peter van Heemst	PvdA	30 January 2003	16 May 2006 (Note: Left to join the Municipal Council of Rotterdam)	
Mat Herben	LPF	30 January 2003	29 November 2006	
Max Hermans	LPF	30 January 2003	29 November 2006	
Jos Hessels	CDA	30 January 2003	29 November 2006	
Godelieve van Heteren	PvdA	30 January 2003	29 November 2006	
Eddy van Hijum	CDA	2 September 2003	29 November 2006	
Maria van der Hoeven	CDA	30 January 2003	27 May 2003	
Pieter Hofstra	VVD	30 January 2003	29 November 2006	
Hans Hoogervorst	VVD	30 January 2003	27 May 2003	
Jan ten Hoopen	CDA	30 January 2003	29 November 2006	
Tineke Huizinga	CU	30 January 2003	29 November 2006	
Ewout Irrgang	SP	30 January 2003	29 November 2006	
Rikus Jager	CDA	30 January 2003	29 November 2006	
Cisca Joldersma	CDA	30 January 2003	29 November 2006	
Corien Jonker	CDA	31 August 2004	29 November 2006	
Paul Jungbluth	GL	29 June 2005	29 November 2006	
Ella Kalsbeek	PvdA	30 January 2003	29 November 2006	
Henk Kamp	VVD	30 January 2003	27 May 2003	
Agnes Kant	SP	30 January 2003	29 November 2006	
Farah Karimi	GL	30 January 2003	29 November 2006	
Cees van der Knaap	CDA	30 January 2003	27 May 2003	
Raymond Knops	CDA	11 October 2005	29 November 2006	
Bert Koenders	PvdA	30 January 2003	29 November 2006	
Myra Koomen	CDA	3 June 2003	6 June 2006 (Note: Left to become alderwoman in Enschede)	
Ger Koopmans	CDA	30 January 2003	29 November 2006	
Roland Kortenhorst	CDA	30 January 2003	29 November 2006	
Fatma Koşer Kaya	D66	8 September 2004	29 November 2006	
Guus Krähe	PvdA	17 May 2006	29 November 2006	
Margot Kraneveldt	LPF	30 January 2003	4 July 2006	
Paul de Krom	VVD	30 January 2003	29 November 2006	
Joanneke Kruijsen	PvdA	30 January 2003	29 November 2006	
Lousewies van der Laan	D66	30 January 2003	29 November 2006	
Ursie Lambrechts	D66	3 June 2003	29 November 2006	
Ali Lazrak	SP (Note: Until 2 February 2004)	30 January 2003	29 November 2006	
Ali Lazrak	Lazrak (Note: Starting 2 February 2004)	30 January 2003	29 November 2006	
John Leerdam	PvdA	30 January 2003	29 November 2006	
Janmarc Lenards	VVD	31 August 2005	29 November 2006	
Erik van Lith	CDA	30 January 2003	29 November 2006	
Ruud Luchtenveld	VVD	3 June 2003	27 June 2006 (Note: Left to become alderman in Amersfoort)	
Jan Marijnissen	SP	30 January 2003	29 November 2006	
Jan Mastwijk	CDA	30 January 2003	29 November 2006	
Peter Meijer	PvdA	8 November 2005	29 November 2006	
Theo Meijer	CDA	30 January 2003	31 August 2003 (Note: Left to become chair of the Arable Farming Product Boards)	
Anouchka van Miltenburg	VVD	30 January 2003	29 November 2006	
Aart Mosterd	CDA	30 January 2003	29 November 2006	
Hilbrand Nawijn	LPF (Note: Until 23 June 2005)	30 January 2003	29 November 2006	
Hilbrand Nawijn	Nawijn (Note: Starting 23 June 2005)	30 January 2003	29 November 2006	
Frans de Nerée tot Babberich	CDA	30 January 2003	29 November 2006	
Atzo Nicolaï	VVD	30 January 2003	27 May 2003	
Jeltje van Nieuwenhoven	PvdA	30 January 2003	26 October 2004 (Note: Left to the Provincial Executive of South Holland)	
Annette Nijs	VVD	30 January 2003	27 May 2003	
Annette Nijs	VVD	7 June 2005	29 November 2006	
Saskia Noorman-den Uyl	PvdA	30 January 2003	29 November 2006	
Niny van Oerle-van der Horst	CDA	30 January 2003	29 November 2006	
Pieter Omtzigt	CDA	3 June 2003	29 November 2006	
Gert-Jan Oplaat	VVD	30 January 2003	29 November 2006	
Fadime Örgü	VVD	30 January 2003	29 November 2006	
Henk Jan Ormel	CDA	30 January 2003	29 November 2006	
Gonny van Oudenallen	Van Oudenallen	7 July 2006	29 November 2006	
Nevin Özütok	GL	30 May 2006	29 November 2006	
Marleen de Pater-van der Meer	CDA	30 January 2003	29 November 2006	
Nirmala Rambocus	CDA	30 January 2003	29 November 2006	
Johan Remkes	VVD	30 January 2003	27 May 2003	
Theo Rietkerk	CDA	30 January 2003	20 May 2003 (Note: Left to join the Provincial Executive of Overijssel)	
Jan Rijpstra	VVD	30 January 2003	31 July 2005 (Note: Left to become mayor of Tynaarlo)	
Lia Roefs	PvdA	27 October 2004	29 November 2006	
Clémence Ross-van Dorp	CDA	30 January 2003	29 November 2006	
André Rouvoet	CU	30 January 2003	29 November 2006	
Piet de Ruiter	SP	30 January 2003	30 September 2005	
Mark Rutte	VVD	30 January 2003	27 May 2003	
Mark Rutte	VVD	28 June 2006	29 November 2006	
Diederik Samsom	PvdA	30 January 2003	29 November 2006	
Ed van der Sande	VVD	30 June 2005	29 November 2006	
Anton van Schijndel	VVD (Note: Until 7 September 2006)	30 August 2005	29 November 2006	
Anton van Schijndel	Van Schijndel (Note: Between 7 September 2006 and 25 September 2006)	30 August 2005	29 November 2006	
Anton van Schijndel	Eerdmans/Van Schijndel (Note: Starting 25 September 2006)	30 August 2005	29 November 2006	
Edith Schippers	VVD	3 June 2003	29 November 2006	
Annie Schreijer-Pierik	CDA	30 January 2003	29 November 2006	
Melanie Schultz van Haegen	VVD	30 January 2003	27 May 2003	
Arie Slob	CU	30 January 2003	29 November 2006	
Pauline Smeets	PvdA	30 January 2003	29 November 2006	
Margreeth Smilde	CDA	3 June 2003	29 November 2006	
José Smits	PvdA	30 January 2003	29 November 2006	
Janneke Snijder-Hazelhoff	VVD	3 June 2003	29 November 2006	
Liesbeth Spies	CDA	30 January 2003	29 November 2006	
Kees van der Staaij	SGP	30 January 2003	29 November 2006	
Mirjam Sterk	CDA	30 January 2003	29 November 2006	
Piet Straub	PvdA	30 January 2003	29 November 2006	
Olaf Stuger	LPF	30 January 2003	29 November 2006	
Hannie Stuurman	PvdA	30 January 2003	29 November 2006	
Zsolt Szabó	VVD	3 June 2003	29 November 2006	
Erica Terpstra	VVD	30 January 2003	14 December 2003 (Note: Left to become chair of NOC*NSF)	
Jacques Tichelaar	PvdA	30 January 2003	29 November 2006	
Anja Timmer	PvdA	30 January 2003	29 November 2006	
Frans Timmermans	PvdA	30 January 2003	29 November 2006	
Varina Tjon-A-Ten	PvdA	30 January 2003	29 November 2006	
Evelien Tonkens	GL	30 January 2003	28 June 2005 (Note: Left to become professor at the University of Amsterdam)	
João Varela	LPF	30 January 2003	29 November 2006	
Jelleke Veenendaal	VVD	16 December 2003	29 November 2006	
Krista van Velzen	SP	30 January 2003	29 November 2006	
Kees Vendrik	GL	30 January 2003	29 November 2006	
Gerdi Verbeet	PvdA	30 January 2003	29 November 2006	
Gerda Verburg	CDA	30 January 2003	29 November 2006	
Co Verdaas	PvdA	30 January 2003	29 November 2006	
Fenna Vergeer-Mudde	SP	30 January 2003	29 November 2006	
Maxime Verhagen	CDA	30 January 2003	29 November 2006	
Antoinette Vietsch	CDA	30 January 2003	29 November 2006	
Arno Visser	VVD	3 June 2003	29 November 2006	
Bas van der Vlies	SGP	30 January 2003	29 November 2006	
Marijke Vos	GL	30 January 2003	23 May 2006	
Bibi de Vries	VVD	30 January 2003	29 November 2006	
Jan de Vries	CDA	30 January 2003	29 November 2006	
Klaas de Vries	PvdA	30 January 2003	29 November 2006	
Nicolien van Vroonhoven	CDA	30 January 2003	29 November 2006	
Harm Evert Waalkens	PvdA	30 January 2003	29 November 2006	
Hans Wagner	PvdA	30 January 2003	29 November 2006	
Frans Weekers	VVD	3 June 2003	29 November 2006	
Frans Weisglas	VVD	30 January 2003	29 November 2006	
Joop Wijn	CDA	30 January 2003	27 May 2003	
Geert Wilders	VVD (Note: Until 2 September 2004)	30 January 2003	29 November 2006	
Geert Wilders	Wilders (Note: Between 2 September 2004 and 23 November 2006)	30 January 2003	29 November 2006	
Geert Wilders	PVV (Note: Starting 23 November 2006)	30 January 2003	29 November 2006	
Ans Willemse-van der Ploeg	CDA	7 June 2006	29 November 2006	
Bart van Winsen	CDA	30 January 2003	29 November 2006	
Jan de Wit	SP	30 January 2003	29 November 2006	
Aleid Wolfsen	PvdA	30 January 2003	29 November 2006	
Gerrit Zalm	VVD	30 January 2003	27 May 2003	

== See also ==
- List of candidates in the 2003 Dutch general election
