= Roelien Kamminga =

Dutch politician (born 1978)

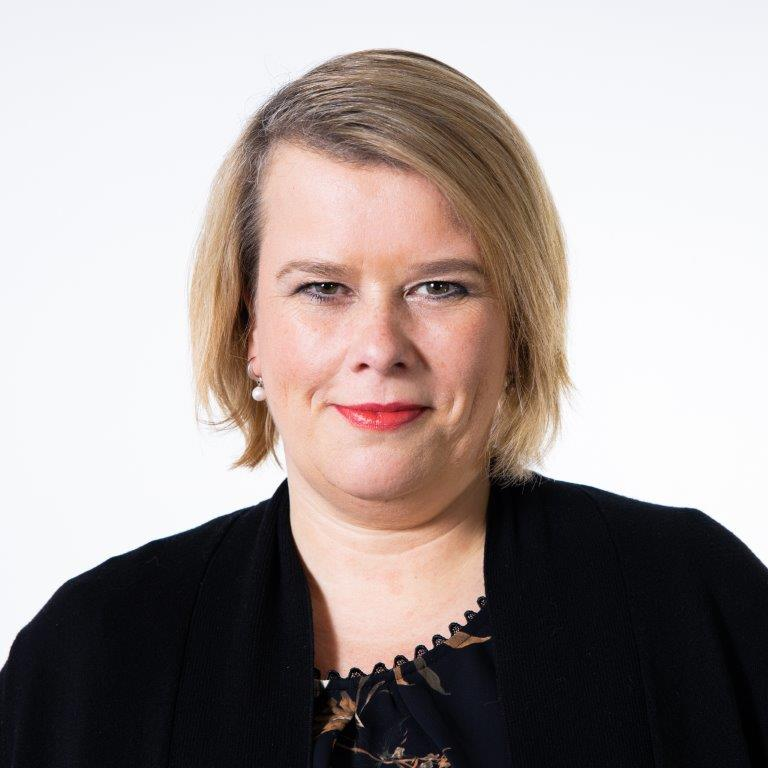
- Kamminga in 2020

Mayor of Groningen
- Incumbent
- Assumed office 30 June 2025
- Preceded by: Mirjam van 't Veld

Speaker of the House of Representatives
- Acting
- In office 6 December 2023 – 14 December 2023
- Preceded by: Vera Bergkamp
- Succeeded by: Martin Bosma

Member of the House of Representatives
- In office 31 March 2021 – 3 June 2025
- Succeeded by: Simone Richardson

Personal details
- Born: Roelien Jakoba Kamminga; 13 April 1978 (age 48) Groningen, Netherlands
- Party: People's Party for Freedom and Democracy
- Education: University of Groningen
- Occupation: Civil servant
- Website: Mayor of Groningen

Roelien Jakoba Kamminga (born 13 April 1978) is a Dutch politician and civil servant who has served as the Mayor of Groningen since 2025. A member of the People's Party for Freedom and Democracy, she served as a Member of the House of Representatives from 2021 to 2025. In the end of 2023 she served as the Acting Speaker of the House of Representatives.

== Early life and career ==
Kamminga was born in 1978 in Groningen. She grew up in the village of Zuidbroek and attended the Veendam secondary school Winkler Prins at vwo level. She subsequently studied English language and literature at the University of Groningen, obtaining her propedeuse in 2000. She also studied international relations at the same university until her graduation in 2004.

Kamminga's first job was in Vienna for the Ministry of Foreign Affairs as an adviser to the permanent mission of the Netherlands to the United Nations. In 2005, Kamminga started working at the Ministry of the Interior and Kingdom Relations. She first served as an international security analyst and as a counter-proliferation policy officer. Between 2009 and 2012, she headed the ministry's security investigations business unit. Kamminga then worked as an intelligence and security issues advisor to Minister Ronald Plasterk and – starting in 2014 – as a public order, intelligence, and security adviser. While in the latter position, she also served for a few months in 2017 as acting director general of reconstruction, assisting Sint Maarten in the wake of Hurricane Irma.

Between September 2019 and her election to the House in 2021, Kamminga was director of the interior and kingdom relations ministry's program concerning induced earthquakes due to gas extraction in the province of Groningen.

== House of Representatives ==
Kamminga was the VVD's seventh candidate in the 2019 European Parliament election and was not elected. She ran for member of parliament in the 2021 general election, being placed 14th on the VVD's party list. Kamminga received 6,334 preference votes and was sworn into the House of Representatives on 31 March. She became the VVD's spokesperson for European affairs, and kingdom relations was later added to that. She is part of the following committees and groups:

Kamminga succeeded Ockje Tellegen as deputy chair of the House of Representatives and as secretary of the VVD's parliamentary group in August 2022. European affairs was simultaneously dropped from her specialties. Following the November 2023 general election, Kamminga started serving as the VVD's spokesperson for international trade, development cooperation, childcare benefits scandal, and regions.

On 3 June 2025 Kamminga left the House of Representatives. She was succeeded by party member Simone Richardson.

=== House committee assignments ===
==== 2021–2023 term ====
- Contact group Belgium
- Contact group France
- Contact group Germany
- Contact group United Kingdom
- Committee for Agriculture, Nature and Food Quality
- Committee for Digital Affairs (chair)
- Dutch parliamentary delegation to the Council of Europe
- Committee for European Affairs
- Committee for Finance
- Committee for Foreign Affairs
- Committee for Foreign Trade and Development Cooperation
- Committee for the Interior
- Committee for Kingdom Relations
- Procedure Committee
- Delegation to the Benelux Parliament

==== 2023–2025 term ====
- Presidium (Second Deputy Speaker)
- Contact group France (chair)
- Committee for Foreign Affairs (vice chair)
- Committee for Kingdom Relations
- Contact group Belgium
- Committee for Foreign Trade and Development
- Contact group Germany
- Contact group United Kingdom
- Committee for Agriculture, Fisheries, Food Security and Nature
- Committee for Infrastructure and Water Management
- Delegation to the Benelux Parliament

== Mayor of Groningen ==
On the 7th of April 2025 Kamminga was selected by the Municipal council of Groningen to become the new Mayor. On the 23rd of May the selection was approved by the Council of Ministers to be appointed by royal decree effective June the 30th. On June the 30th she also took the oath in the presence of the King's Commissioner in the province of Groningen, René Paas.

As Mayor of Groningen Kamminga chairs the Municipal council and the Municipal executive. She has also her own responsibilities. She is responsible for public order & safety, supervision & enforcement of public spaces, National Program Groningen, external relations & city twinning, regional cooperation, media & communications, coordination Agreement of Groningen, asylum policy in relation to the Security Council, general affairs and municipal archives.

== Electoral history ==
Electoral history of Roelien Kamminga
Year	Body	Party	Pos.	Votes	Result		Ref.
Year	Body	Party	Pos.	Votes	Party seats	Individual	Ref.
2021	House of Representatives	People's Party for Freedom and Democracy	14	6,334	34	Won	
2023	House of Representatives	People's Party for Freedom and Democracy	9	5,309	24	Won	
