= Ingrid Michon =

Member of the Dutch House of Representatives

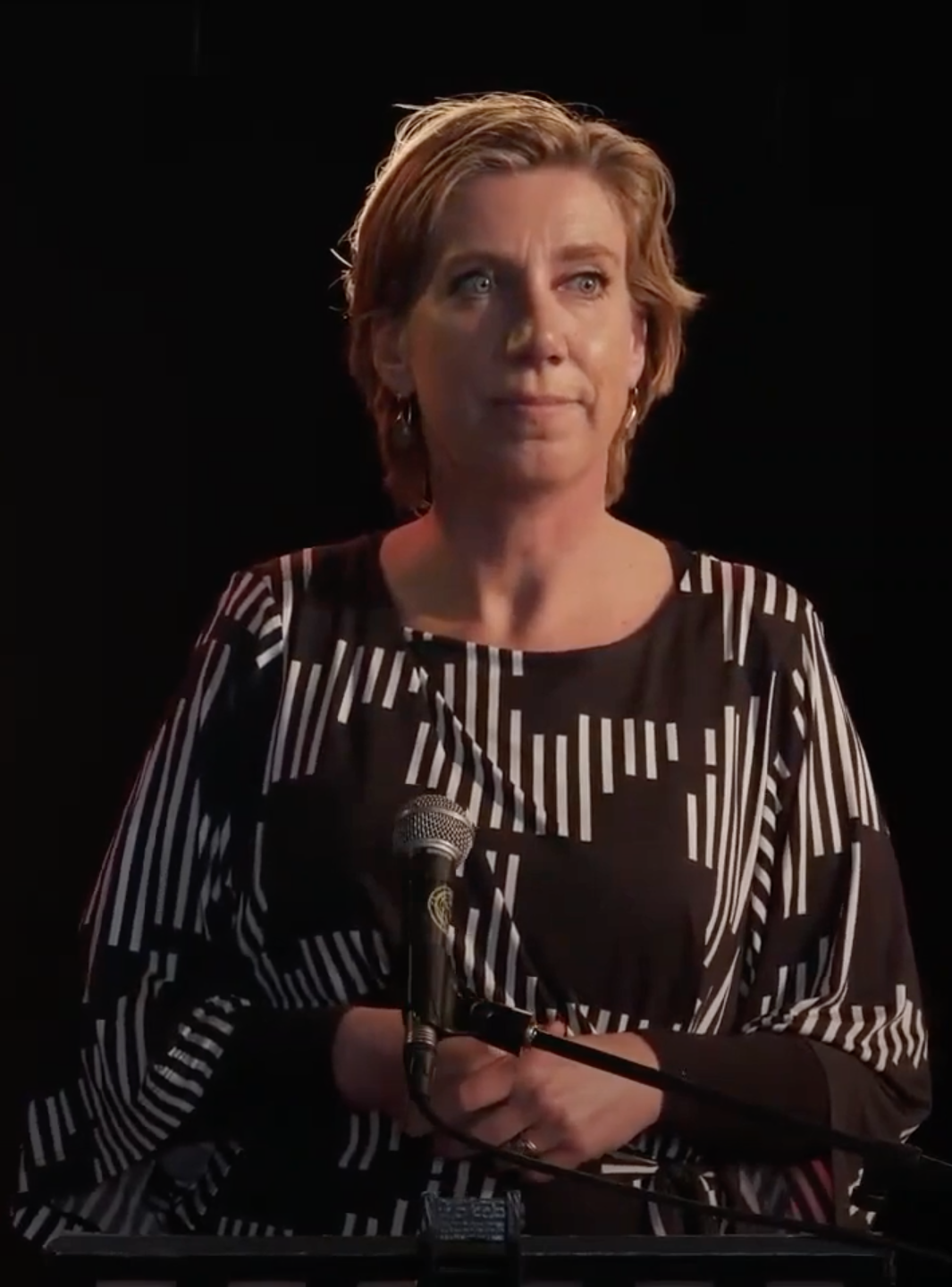

Sixth Deputy Speaker of the House of Representatives
- Incumbent
- Assumed office 20 November 2025
- Preceded by: Thom van Campen

Member of the House of Representatives
- Incumbent
- Assumed office 31 March 2021

Member of The Hague municipal council
- In office 27 March 2014 – 28 March 2018

Personal details
- Born: 14 September 1976 (age 50) Arnhem, Netherlands
- Party: People's Party for Freedom and Democracy (VVD)
- Children: 3
- Education: Utrecht University
- Website: ingridmichon.nl

Ingrid Johanna Maria Michon-Derkzen (born 14 September 1976) is a Dutch civil servant and politician of the conservative liberal People's Party for Freedom and Democracy (VVD). She was elected to the House of Representatives in the 2021 general election, and she previously served as a member of the municipal council of The Hague (2014–18).

== Early life and career ==
Michon was born in 1976 in the Gelderland city of Arnhem. Her parents owned a greengrocer's in that city. Michon studied Dutch law at Utrecht University.

She held several positions at the Ministry of the Interior and Kingdom Relations including acting program manager of further development of the organizational structure of the police and acting head of the bureau of the Director-General for Security. Starting in 2010, she served as the political assistant of Ivo Opstelten, the Minister of Security and Justice. When Opstelten resigned in 2015, Michon stayed at the Ministry of Justice and Security, working as project leader at its cybersecurity division.

In October 2015, she took a job at the Ministry of Infrastructure and the Environment as head of the drones team of the aviation division. Michon returned to the interior and kingdom relations ministry in 2018 to head the bureau of the director-general of the Central Government Real Estate Agency. She left that position, when she became a member of parliament in 2021.

Michon has also been serving on the boards of both Festival Classique, a classical music festival, and De Ooievaart, which offers boat tours in The Hague, since 2018.

== Politics ==
Michon joined the VVD in 2000 and was that party's third candidate in The Hague in the 2014 municipal elections. She was elected to the municipal council and served as vice caucus leader of the VVD. Her focus was on security, social affairs, poverty, and outdoor spaces. Michon decided not to run for re-election in 2018, because she was offered a worse place on the party list than in 2014.

She ran for member of parliament in the 2021 general election, being placed twentieth on the VVD's party list. She was elected with 1,654 preference votes and was sworn into the House of Representatives on 31 March. Michon became the VVD's spokesperson for primary and secondary education, aviation, water, and shipping, but her specialties were changed shortly after to police, fire brigade, the Public Prosecution Service, border protection, counter-terrorism, the NCTV, disaster and crisis management, national security, drug policy, and sex offenses. In the House, Michon voiced her opposition to repatriating Dutch women who had joined the Islamic State, saying that they should be tried in the region. However, she later conceded that it would be preferable to try them in the Dutch judicial system if no other option is available. She also proposed to prohibit doxing – the practice of publishing private information – leading the cabinet to work on a ban.

Following the November 2023 general election, Michon's portfolio remained similar. She wrote a policy memorandum containing proposals to crack down on football hooliganism. She suggested that football clubs should reimburse costs for extraordinary security and that the Royal Dutch Football Association (KNVB) should help implement tighter measures to prevent those with stadium bans from entering. She also sought to criminalize supporters entering the pitch and lip-syncing racist and insulting chants. In line with the coalition agreement's commitment to take stricter action against disruptive demonstrations, Michon announced several proposals during a January 2025 debate. She argued that demonstrations should not be used to commit criminal offenses, and she advocated for measures such as prohibiting blockades of major infrastructure, allowing mayors to ban protests near commemoration ceremonies, better tracking the identities of participants in illegal demonstrations, and requiring demonstrators to pay for any damages. In the discussion to prohibit consumer fireworks during New Year, Michon upheld her party's opposition. According to her, a ban would not address violence against first responders, as such incidents often involved heavy fireworks already prohibited by law.

=== House committee assignments ===
==== 2021–2023 term ====
- Committee for Education, Culture, and Science (chair)
- Committee for Agriculture, Nature and Food Quality
- Committee for Justice and Security
- Procedure Committee
- Parliamentary Inquiry into Fraud Policy and Services
- Delegation to the Parliamentary Assembly of the Council of Europe

==== 2023–present term ====
- Committee for Economic Affairs (chair)
- Committee for Justice and Security
- Committee for Education, Culture and Science
- Committee for Digital Affairs
- Procedure Committee

== Personal life ==
In 2000, Michon moved from Arnhem to The Hague, where she has since been living with her husband. They have three children, two of which are twins.

== Electoral history ==
Electoral history of Ingrid Michon
Year	Body	Party	Pos.	Votes	Result		Ref.
Year	Body	Party	Pos.	Votes	Party seats	Individual	Ref.
2021	House of Representatives	People's Party for Freedom and Democracy	20	1,654	34 / 150	Won	
2023	House of Representatives	People's Party for Freedom and Democracy	19	1,156	24 / 150	Won	
2025	House of Representatives	People's Party for Freedom and Democracy	15	2,514	22 / 150	Won	
2026	The Hague Municipal Council	People's Party for Freedom and Democracy	38	23	3 / 45	Lost	
