= Gerard Beelaerts van Blokland =

Dutch politician (1843–1897)

Jonkheer Gerard Beelaerts van Blokland
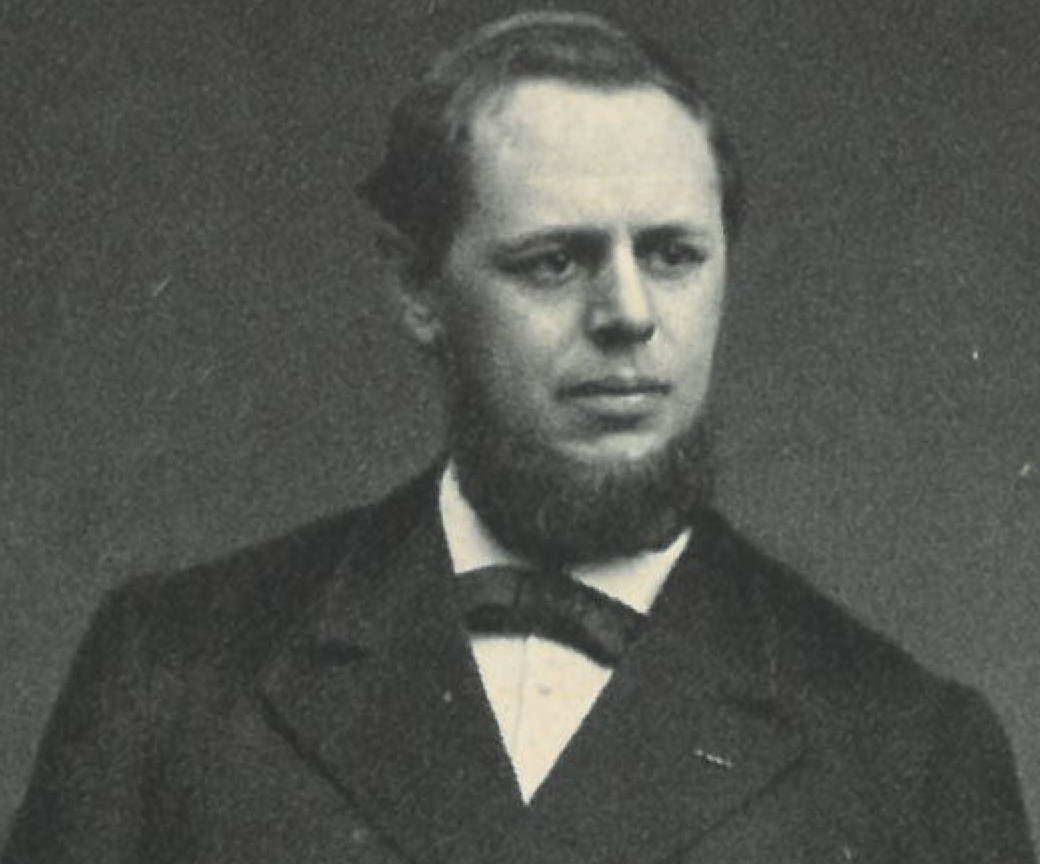
- Beelaerts van Blokland in 1884

Speaker of the House of Representatives
- In office 7 May 1888 – 15 September 1891
- Preceded by: Eppo Cremers
- Succeeded by: Johan George Gleichman

Personal details
- Born: Gerard Jacob Theodoor Beelaerts van Blokland; 12 January 1843 Rotterdam, Netherlands
- Died: 14 March 1897 (aged 54) The Hague, Netherlands
- Awards: Order of the Netherlands Lion

Gerard Jacob Theodoor Beelaerts van Blokland (12 January 1843 – 14 March 1897) was a Dutch politician known for serving as European envoy for the South African Republic from 1884 to 1897, and as Speaker of the House of Representatives from 1888 to 1891.

== Biography ==
=== Early life ===
Gerard Jacob Theodoor was born in Rotterdam, into the Beelaerts van Blokland family – an old Dutch patrician family and members of the Dutch nobility since 1815. His grandfather served as attorney-general and secretary of justice of the Dutch Cape Colony and British Cape Colony, respectively. His father was born in the Cape.

=== Career ===
After completing his studies, Beelaerts started his career working as lawyer at the Supreme Court of the Netherlands and as clerk in the Netherlands Department of Justice eventually rising to the rank of legal secretary. As a lawyer, he was a member of various state committees.

From 1883 until 1894, he served as member in the Dutch House of Representatives and as Speaker of the House from 1888 until 1891. He also served as member of the Provincial Council of South Holland from 1888 until 1892. He was appointed Knight of the Order of the Netherlands Lion by royal decree.

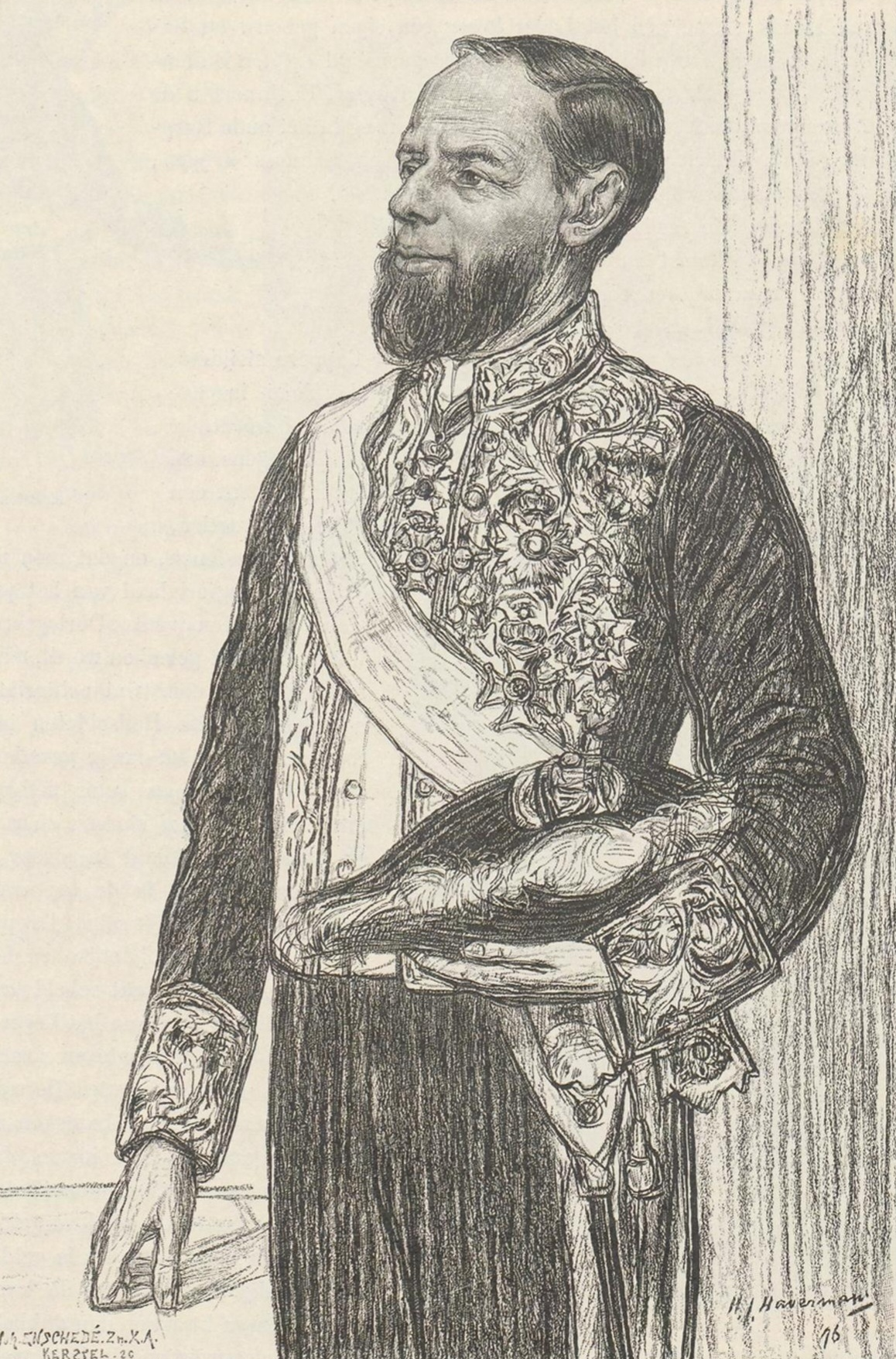
G.J.Th. Beelaerts van Blokland by Hendrik Haverman

The Beelaerts van Blokland family were orthodox Protestants and maintained a long-standing interest in South Africa. Beelaerts was a member of a committee to aid the cause of the Boers in the South African Republic. He served as legal adviser to the Boer delegation to London to review the Pretoria Convention of 1883. From 1884, Beelaerts served as resident for the South African Republic and from 1889, he served as envoy representing the South African Republic in Europe. He performed this function without compensation until his death in 1897.

He also served as commissaire général of the South African delegation at the 1894 World Exhibition in Antwerp.

=== Death ===
Beelaerts died in The Hague on 14 March 1897. Archives relating to Beelaerts are located in the Nationaal Archief in The Hague and the Zuid-Afrikahuis in Amsterdam. A collection of South African objects gathered by Gerard Jacob Theodoor and his son Cornelis were donated to the Museum Volkenkunde in Leiden in 1941, where they make up part of the South African collection.

Political offices
Preceded by Eppo Cremers	Speaker of the House of Representatives; 1888–1891	Succeeded by Johan George Gleichman
