= Charlie Aptroot =

Dutch politician (born 1950)

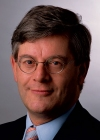

Member of the House of Representatives
- In office 30 January 2003 – 19 September 2012

Personal details
- Born: Charles Bernard Aptroot; 20 September 1950 (age 75) The Hague, Netherlands
- Party: People's Party for Freedom and Democracy
- Spouse: Married
- Occupation: Politician; civil servant; businessperson; teacher
- Website: (in Dutch) Official site

Charles Bernard Aptroot (born 20 September 1950) is a Dutch politician of the People's Party for Freedom and Democracy (VVD). He was a Member of the House of Representatives from 30 January 2003 to 19 September 2012. He focused on matters of traffic, public transport and internal affairs. On 1 September 2012, he became mayor of Zoetermeer.

Aptroot was elected to the House of Representatives in the 2003 general election. In 2010, he contested the election for Speaker of the House of Representatives but was defeated by incumbent Speaker Gerdi Verbeet.

In the past, Aptroot was a member of the municipal council of Wassenaar from 1982 to 1998 and an alderman of the same municipality from 1990 to 1996. He was also a member of the States of South Holland from 1999 to 2003.

In March 2020, Aptroot retired as mayor of Zoetermeer.
