= Eppo Cremers =

Dutch politician (1823–1896)

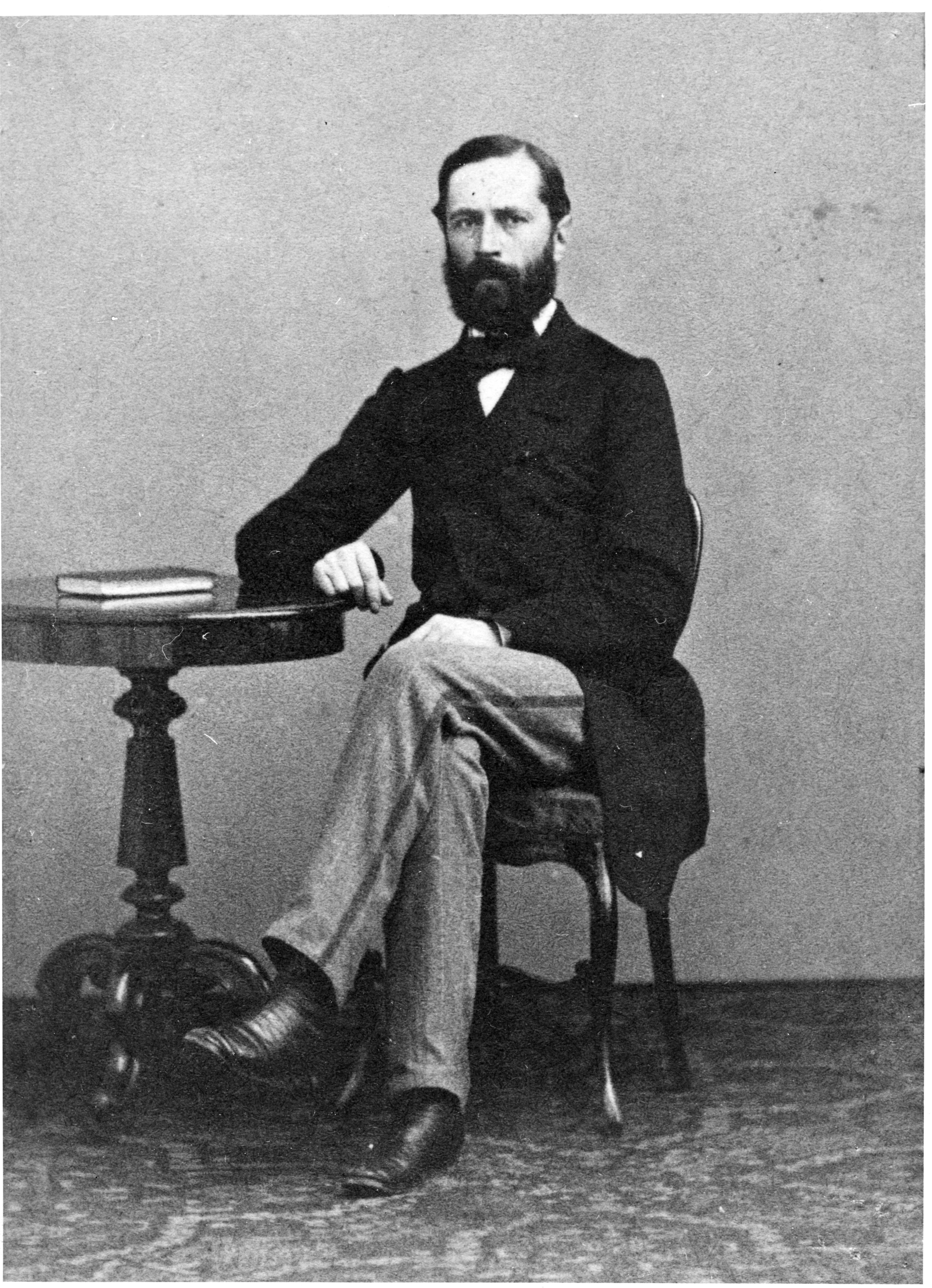
E.J.J.B. Cremers

Epimachus Jacobus Johannes Baptista (Eppo) Cremers (15 June 1823 in Groningen – 27 October 1896 in Zürich) was a Dutch politician.

He was Minister of Foreign Affairs from March 1864 to June 1866 and thrice Speaker of the House of Representatives of the Netherlands in between 1884 and 1888.

House of Representatives of the Netherlands
Preceded by Nicolaas Olivier	Member for Zuidhorn; 1869–1891	Succeeded by Geuchien Zijlma
Political offices
Preceded by Willem Huyssen van Kattendijke	Minister of Foreign Affairs; 1864–1866	Succeeded by Julius van Zuylen van Nijevelt
Preceded by Otto van Rees	Speaker of the House of Representatives; 1884	Succeeded by Æneas Mackay
Preceded by Æneas Mackay	Speaker of the House of Representatives; 1885–1888	Succeeded by Gerard Beelaerts van Blokland
