= Vera Bergkamp =

Dutch politician (born 1971)

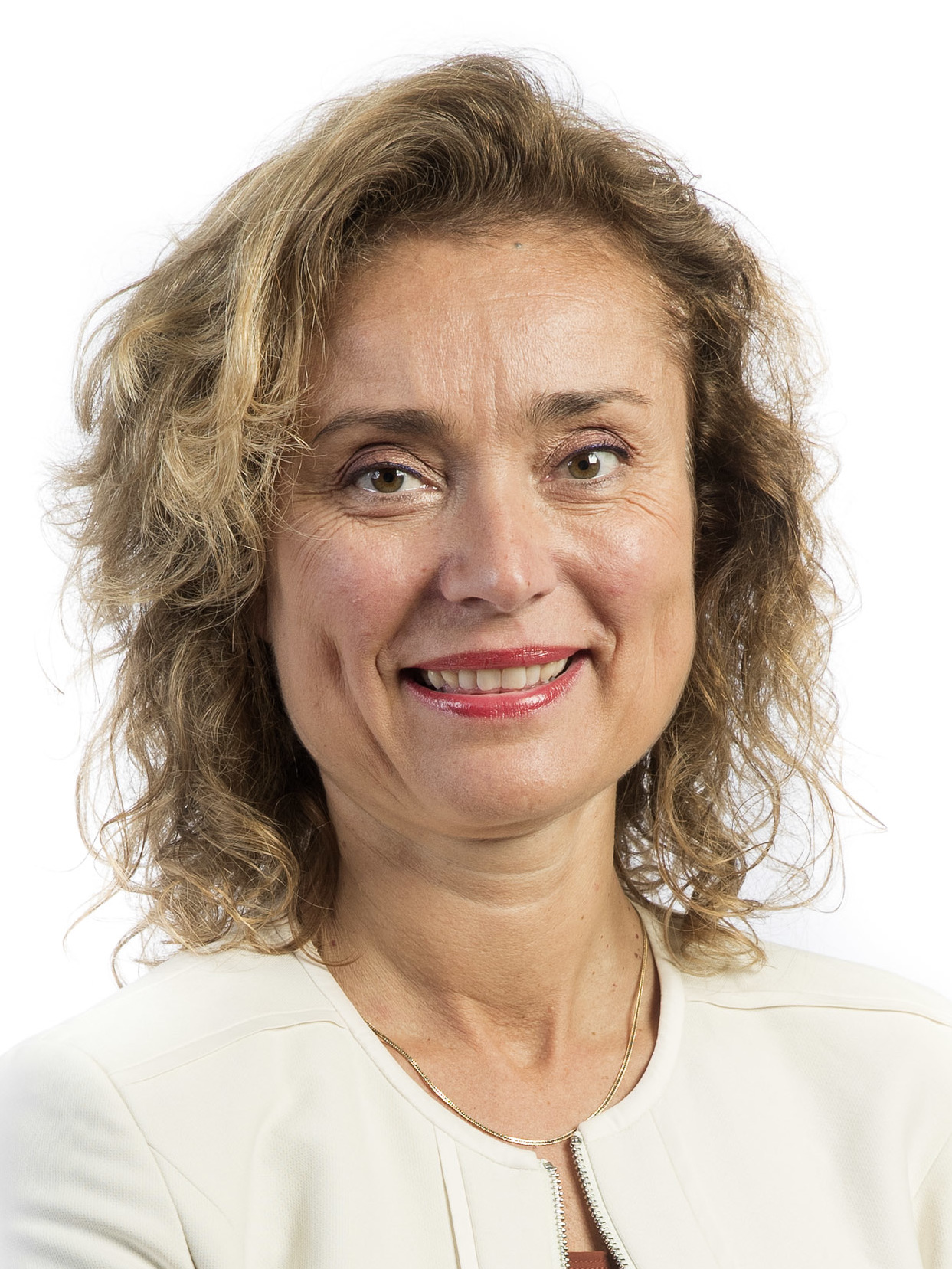
- Bergkamp in 2017

Speaker of the House of Representatives
- In office 7 April 2021 – 5 December 2023
- Preceded by: Khadija Arib
- Succeeded by: Martin Bosma

Member of the House of Representatives
- In office 20 September 2012 – 5 December 2023

Personal details
- Born: Firouz Alida Chaouqui; 1 June 1971 (age 55) Amsterdam, Netherlands
- Party: Democrats 66
- Children: 2
- Education: Hogeschool van Amsterdam; Vrije Universiteit Amsterdam (MSc)

Vera Alida Bergkamp (born Firouz Alida Chaouqui, 1 June 1971) is a retired Dutch politician. A member of the Democrats 66 (D66) party, she served as Speaker of the House of Representatives from 7 April 2021 to 5 December 2023. She was a member of the House of Representatives between 20 September 2012 and 5 December 2023.

== Early life and education ==
Bergkamp was born Firouz Alida Chaouqui in Amsterdam to a Dutch mother and a Moroccan father. At the age of 20, she adopted her mother's surname, because she found it difficult to write and pronounce her father's surname. Bergkamp studied human resource management at the Amsterdam University of Applied Sciences. She also holds a master's degree in public administration and political science from the Vrije Universiteit Amsterdam.

== Career ==
From 2008 to 2012, Bergkamp was the director of the human resources department of the Social Insurance Bank (SVB), a Dutch quango responsible for administering national insurance schemes. From 2010 to 2012, she chaired the LGBT rights organisation COC Nederland, as well as held a seat in the district council of Amsterdam-Centrum.

In the 2012 general election, Bergkamp was elected into the House of Representatives as a member of D66. She was re-elected in 2017 and 2021. On 7 April 2021, she succeeded Khadija Arib as Speaker of the House of Representatives after the 2021 Speaker election. On 24 August 2023 Bergkamp announced in a letter that she would no longer stand for election, and would leave national politics after the 2023 House of Representatives elections. She did not give an explicit reason for her departure.

== Personal life ==
Bergkamp is publicly known as lesbian. She is married and has two children.

== Electoral history ==
Electoral history of Vera Bergkamp
Year	Body	Party	Pos.	Votes	Result		Ref.
Year	Body	Party	Pos.	Votes	Party seats	Individual	Ref.
2021	House of Representatives	Democrats 66	3	29,613	24	Won	

Political offices
Preceded by Khadija Arib	Speaker of the House of Representatives; 2021–2023	Succeeded by Martin Bosma
