= Anouchka van Miltenburg =

Dutch politician

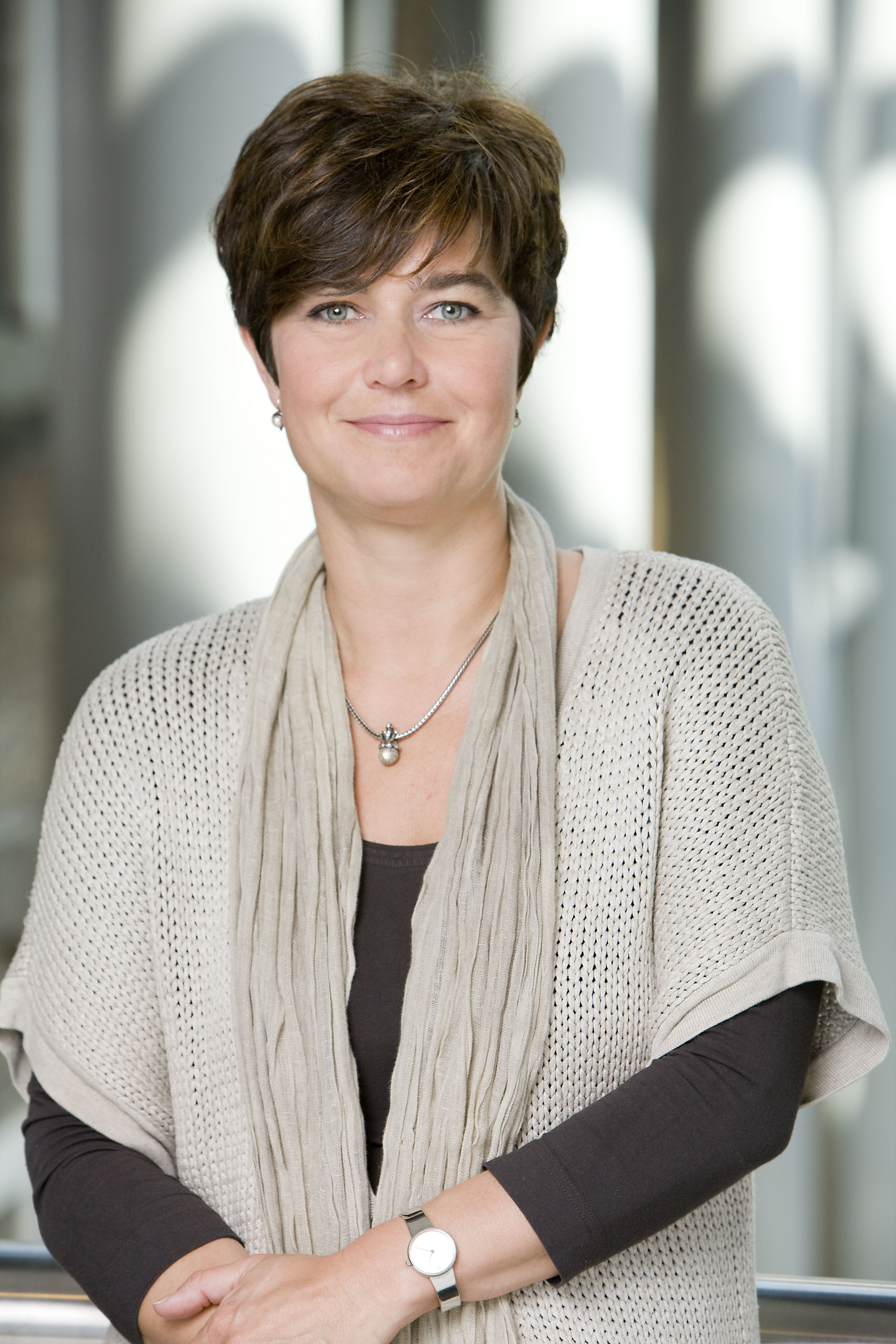
- Van Miltenburg in 2011

Speaker of the House of Representatives
- In office 25 September 2012 – 12 December 2015
- Preceded by: Gerdi Verbeet
- Succeeded by: Khadija Arib

Member of the House of Representatives
- In office 30 January 2003 – 23 March 2017

Personal details
- Born: Anouchka van Miltenburg; 20 April 1967 (age 59) Utrecht, Netherlands
- Party: People's Party for Freedom and Democracy
- Spouse: Chris Halkes (since 1991)
- Occupation: Politician; Journalist
- Website: Official site

Anouchka van Miltenburg (born 20 April 1967) is a retired Dutch politician of the People's Party for Freedom and Democracy (VVD). She was the Speaker of the House of Representatives from 25 September 2012 until 12 December 2015 and served as a member of the House of Representatives between 30 January 2003 and 23 March 2017.

== Biography ==
=== Early life ===
Van Miltenburg attended a MAVO in Utrecht from 1979 until 1984 when she studied for a year at the Prince of Wales College in Vancouver. From 1984 until 1986 she attended a Havo in Nieuwegein. After that she began a study in journalism at the journalism school in Tilburg and graduated in 1991. From 1991 until 2001 she worked as a freelance journalist for various media companies (Brabants Dagblad, NOS). From 1992 until 1993 she worked as a teacher at a media school in 's-Hertogenbosch.

=== Politics ===
On 14 March 2002 she was elected as a member of the municipal council in her hometown of Zaltbommel for the People's Party for Freedom and Democracy. She left the municipal council on 1 January 2003 when she became a candidate for the House of Representatives during the Dutch general election of 2003. On 30 January 2003 she became Member of the House of Representatives and was re-elected each time until the 2017 elections. Her main focus was on matters of mass media and medical ethics. On 20 September 2012 she announced her candidacy to succeed Gerdi Verbeet as Speaker of the House of Representatives. Verbeet retired after six-years and this left the high office open. Van Miltenburg defeated fellow former journalist Ton Elias in an internal election in the People's Party for Freedom and Democracy. Van Miltenburg went on to win the presidency after defeating her two rival candidates, Khadija Arib of the Labour Party and Gerard Schouw of the Democrats 66 in the main election and was installed as president the same day on 25 September 2012. Van Miltenburg resigned as Speaker of the House on 12 December 2015 when it became clear she had suppressed two letters of a whistleblower from the justice ministry who had the right details on the Teeven-deal, by putting the letters through the shredder. Her term as member of the House ended on 23 March 2017.

=== Personal ===
Anouchka van Miltenburg has been married to Chris Halkes since 1991 and has three children, she lives in Zaltbommel. She is a member of the Catholic Church. In the 1990s Van Miltenburg was the lead singer of a rock band called Blow Smoke.

Political offices
Preceded by Gerdi Verbeet	Speaker of the House of Representatives; 2012–2015	Succeeded by Khadija Arib
