= Joan Leemhuis-Stout =

Dutch politician

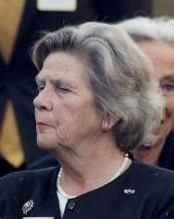
J.M. Leemhuis-Stout (2014)

Joan Marika Leemhuis-Stout (born 29 June 1946, in Hoogezand) is a Dutch politician and former civil servant. She is a member of the People's Party for Freedom and Democracy (Volkspartij voor Vrijheid en Democratie).

Leemhuis-Stout worked among others at the Dutch Ministry of Agriculture and Fishery and for the Dutch Union of Water Boards.

From 1984 to 1994 she was dike-reeve of the water board of Schieland and from 1994 to 1999 Queen's Commissioner of the province of South Holland. From 2011 to 2012 she was interim mayor of Schiedam.

On 13 September 2016, she became the acting King's Commissioner of Friesland, succeeding John Jorritsma. On 1 March 2017, she was succeeded by Arno Brok.

Leemhuis-Stout studied agriculture of the Netherlands at Wageningen University.
