= Martin Bosma =

Dutch politician (born 1964)

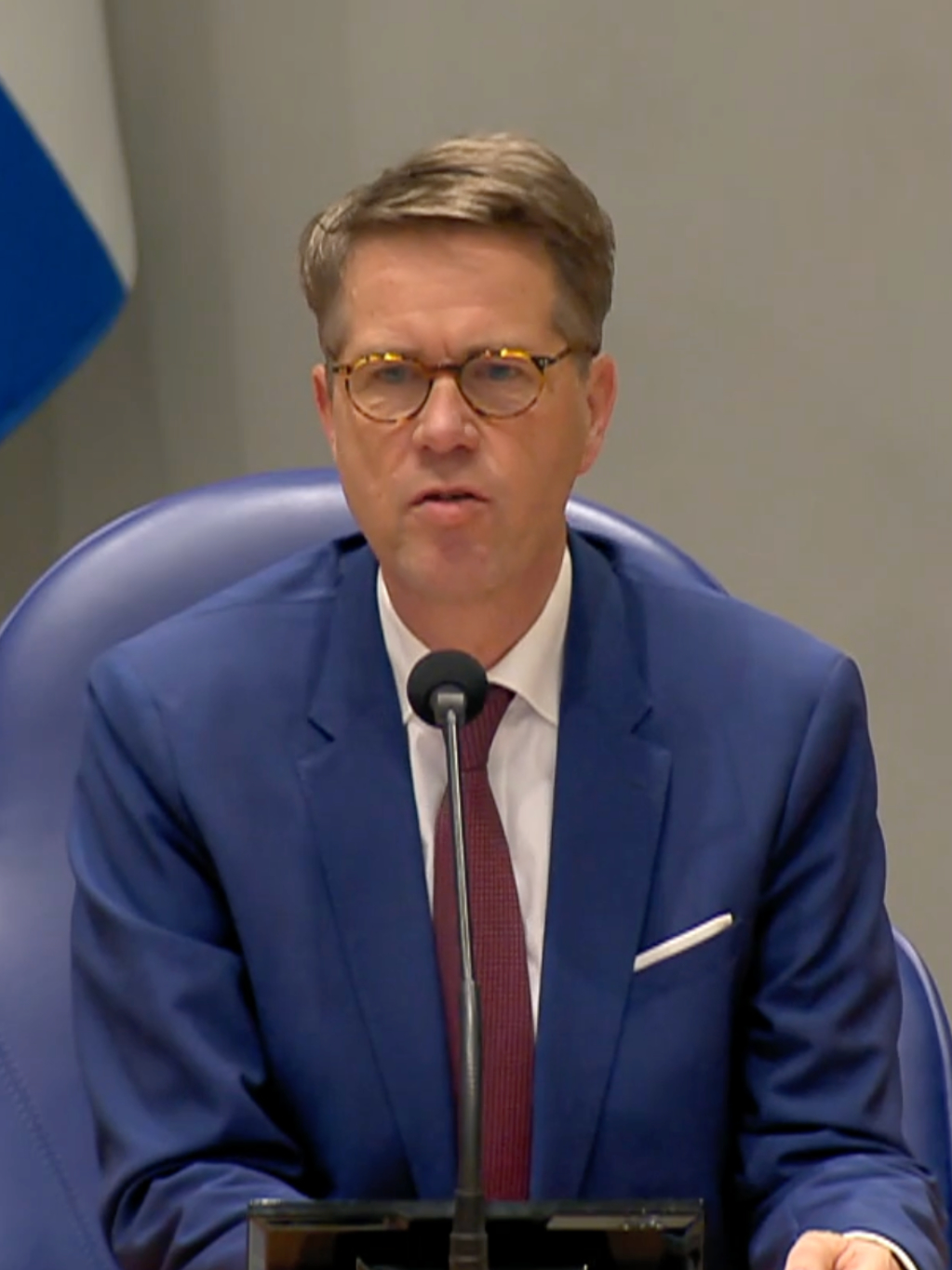
- Bosma in 2023

Speaker of the House of Representatives
- In office 14 December 2023 – 18 November 2025
- Preceded by: Vera Bergkamp
- Succeeded by: Thom van Campen

Member of the House of Representatives
- Incumbent
- Assumed office 30 November 2006

Personal details
- Born: 16 July 1964 (age 62) Wormer, Netherlands
- Party: Party for Freedom (since 2006)
- Education: University of Amsterdam; New School of Social Research

Martin Bosma (born 16 July 1964) is a Dutch politician and former journalist who served as the Speaker of the House of Representatives from 2023 to 2025. He entered the House of Representatives for the Party for Freedom (PVV) on 30 November 2006, and served as his party's spokesperson on matters of higher education, mass media and culture. He also served as Deputy Speaker of the House of Representatives from 2010 until 2023. On 14 December 2023, he was elected Speaker of the House of Representatives.

== Early years and education ==
Born in Wormer, Bosma studied political science with a specialisation in public administration at the University of Amsterdam and sociology at the New School of Social Research in New York City. He has been pursuing a doctorate at the University of Amsterdam, but his dissertation about the Dutch involvement in the anti-apartheid movement was rejected for a second time in 2024. His initial supervisor was Meindert Fennema.

He worked many years for several news media, first as a reporter for one of his local papers, De Zaanlander, and as one of the principal anchormen for Hoeksteen Live, a monthly cable TV programme in the 1990s described as a "political programme with a cultural supplement", and subsequently for outlets including CNN Business News, ABC's Nightline and NOS Journaal. From 2002 to 2004 he was director of Nederlandse Radiogroep and from 2004 to 2006 he was active as a political consultant for the PVV's predecessor Groep Wilders.

== Politics ==
=== Member of parliament ===
Since 2004, Bosma worked for the 'Wilders Group' and later for the Party for Freedom (PVV) that emerged from it, including as campaign manager. He also wrote many of Geert Wilders' speeches. Bosma was first elected to the House of Representatives in the 2006 general election.

For the PVV, Bosma was spokesperson for media and culture and secretary of the PVV party. He has been highly critical of public broadcasting, usually referred to by him as the "state broadcaster". Bosma is a declared opponent of the Dutch public broadcasting system. He has often spoken of what he considers the left-wing character of public broadcasting, which he considers in violation of the Dutch Media Act. He is also an opponent of subsidies to the arts. In March 2009, Bosma submitted a motion to limit the number of current affairs programs on Dutch public broadcasters VARA and NPS starting in 2010, wanting to reduce the "leftist character" of public broadcasting. In September 2009, he submitted parliamentary questions about "Islam propaganda" in public broadcasting children's programs. The parliamentary questions were submitted in response to a preschool program on public TV about Eid al-Fitr.

Bosma has put in doubt the impartiality of the Judiciary of the Netherlands, claiming that "judges in the Netherlands are independent but not impartial; we see that many rulings resemble D66's program". Opposition leader Jesse Klaver of GroenLinks confronted him during his 2023 candidacy for Speaker of the House of Representatives with his claim. In his reply, Bosma defended that position stating he did so in his role as member of the House of Representatives, and that as Speaker of the House of Representatives, he will guard the Dutch separation of powers and do so neutrally.

Bosma regularly argues that there is "repopulation" in the Netherlands. According to that controversial theory, the original Dutch population is being replaced by a new population. The Dutch National Coordinator for Security and Counterterrorism (NCTV) has identified this theory as one of the focus areas of the Dutch right-wing extremist scene to normalise their extremists ideology.

During the 2010 cabinet formation, Bosma was active as a negotiator. Together with his party colleague Tony van Dijck, he spent six weeks at the Ministry of Finance in order to find 18 billion euros in budget cuts with Minister Jan Kees de Jager (CDA) and State Secretary Frans Weekers (VVD).

=== Speaker of the House ===
Bosma became a member of the Presidium of the House of Representatives on 30 June 2010, serving as the Second Deputy Speaker. As such, when Gerdi Verbeet resigned as Speaker on 20 September 2012, Bosma served as Acting Speaker of the House of Representatives until 25 September 2012. He attempted to become Speaker in the 2016 election, but he came fourth, obtaining sixteen votes in the first round of voting. He retained his position of Second Deputy Speaker. In April 2021, he made another attempt to become Speaker. On 14 December 2023, he finally succeeded with 75 votes out of 148 cast in total. He had been re-elected the month before, and he became his party's spokesperson for the interior.

As speaker, Bosma opened meetings of the House of Representatives by reciting different poems. During the Gaza war, pro-Palestinian protesters entered the building of the House on several occasions despite the parliament's ban on demonstrations indoor. Bosma decided to file criminal complaints.

In May 2024, shortly after the agreement between PVV, VVD, NSC and BBB to form a new Dutch government was presented, Bosma interrupted Laurens Dassen of Volt Netherlands in a plenary debate for using the word extreemrechts ("extreme right") when referring to the Party for Freedom. According to Bosma, parties or members of the House should not be referred to as extreme right, as it is a Nazi comparison. A number of members rallied around Dassen, arguing Bosma compromised his independence with this intervention. Bosma did not retract his words, despite members' requests. Later that year, Bosma's invitation to the national slavery remembrance on Ketikoti was withdrawn because of statements he made before becoming speaker.

== Electoral history ==
Electoral history of Martin Bosma
Year	Body	Party	Pos.	Votes	Result		Ref.
Year	Body	Party	Pos.	Votes	Party seats	Individual	Ref.
2006	House of Representatives	Party for Freedom	5	391	9	Won	
2010	House of Representatives	Party for Freedom	5	1,955	24	Won	
2012	House of Representatives	Party for Freedom	3	3,808	15	Won	
2017	House of Representatives	Party for Freedom	6	6,430	20	Won	
2021	House of Representatives	Party for Freedom	7	22,781	17	Won	
2023	House of Representatives	Party for Freedom	5	47,189	37	Won	
2025	House of Representatives	Party for Freedom	6	17,350	26	Won	

== Honours ==
- Spain: Grand Cross of the Order of Civil Merit (9 April 2024)

== Bibliography ==
- De schijn-élite van de valse munters (Prometheus, 2010). ISBN 978-90-3513604-5
- Minderheid in eigen land (Bibliotheca Africana Formicae, 2015). ISBN 978-90-8591202-6

Political offices
Preceded by Vera Bergkamp	Speaker of the House of Representatives; 2023–2025	Succeeded by Thom van Campen
