= Dick Dolman =

Dutch politician (1935–2019)

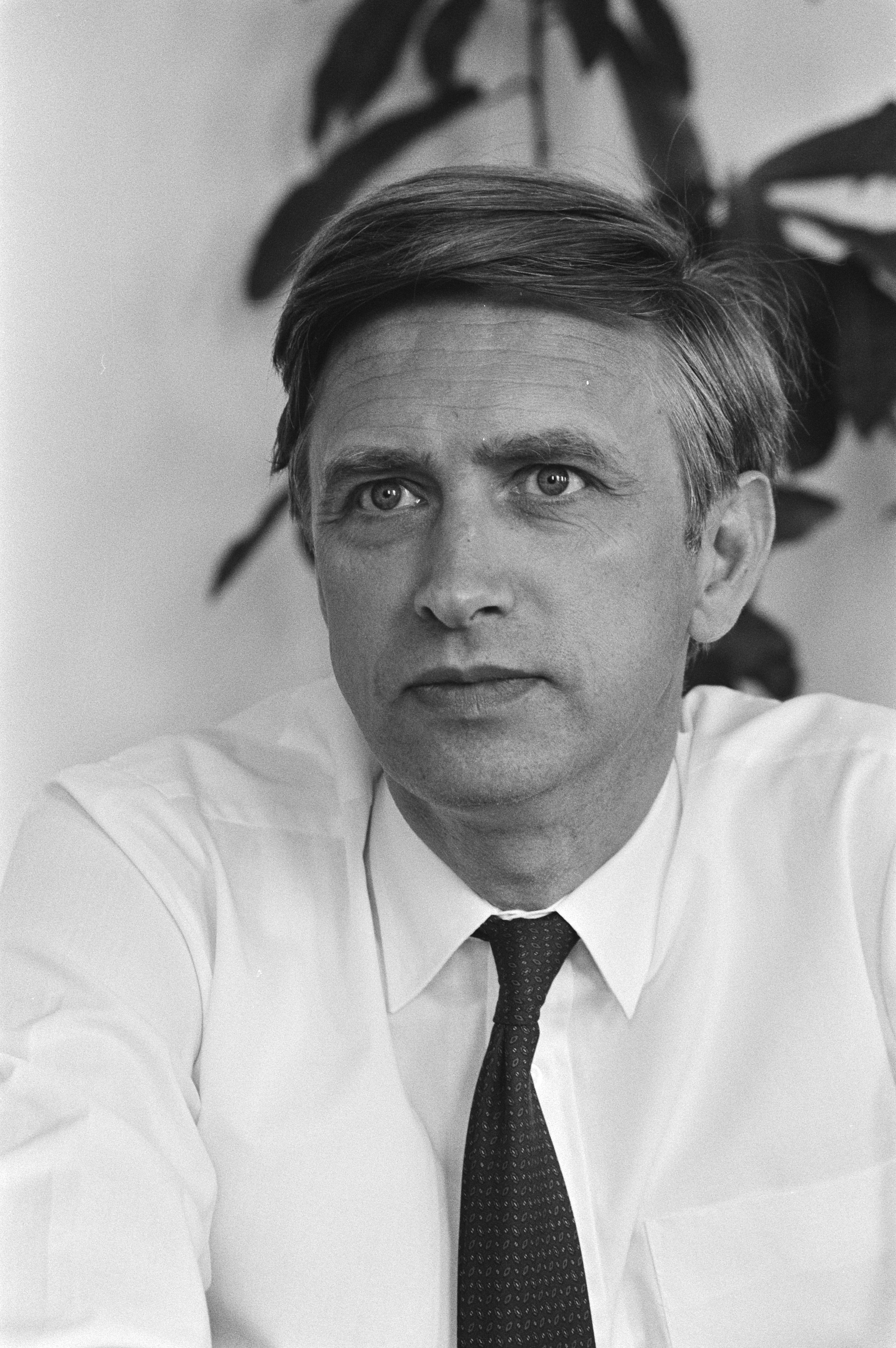
- Dolman in 1981

Member of the Council of State
- In office 1 July 1990 – 1 November 2003

Member of the House of Representatives
- In office 12 May 1970 – 1 July 1990

Speaker of the House of Representatives
- In office 17 July 1979 – 14 September 1989
- Preceded by: Anne Vondeling
- Succeeded by: Wim Deetman

Personal details
- Born: Dirk Dolman; 2 July 1935 Empe, Netherlands
- Died: 23 January 2019 (aged 83)
- Party: Labour Party
- Occupation: Politician

Dirk "Dick" Dolman (2 July 1935 – 23 January 2019) was a Dutch politician. In 1970, he became a member of the House of Representatives as a member of the Labour Party (PvdA). From 17 July 1979 to 14 September 1989 he was the Speaker of the House of Representatives.

== Biography ==
Dolman was born in Empe, Netherlands. In 1951, he was invited to attend Camp Rising Sun, a tuition-free international camp in Red Hook, New York. He joined the Labour Party in 1954.

He worked at the Ministry of Social Affairs and Health from 1963 to 1966. and at the ministry of Economic Affairs from 1966 until the middle of 1970, when he became a member of the House of Representatives, where his initial work was with health issues. In 1973, he became the finance spokesman for his faction. In 1979, he became the Speaker of the House of Representatives, succeeding Anne Vondeling. Dolman took an independent approach, which garnered him great authority from all the parties. Although the PvdA was not the largest party in the 1981 and 1986 elections, he was nevertheless re-elected as president. In 1989, he was defeated 75 to 68 by the emergence of Christian Democratic Appeal politician Wim Deetman. On 1 July 1990, less than a year later, Dolman left the House of Representatives to become a member of the Council of State.

== Trivia ==
- In 1981, Dolman asked cabinet member Til Gardeniers in writing, if the "original was true, that the minister wanted to distribute fines" following possible surreptitious advertising made by the television comedy duo, Van Kooten en De Bie in their alter egos, Jacobse and Van Es. Dolman signed his question with their fictional Tegenpartij.
- There was an interview with Dolman in the first issue of Playboy in 1983.

Political offices
Preceded by Anne Vondeling	Speaker of the House of Representatives; 1979–1989	Succeeded by W.J. Deetman
