= Ton Elias =

Dutch politician

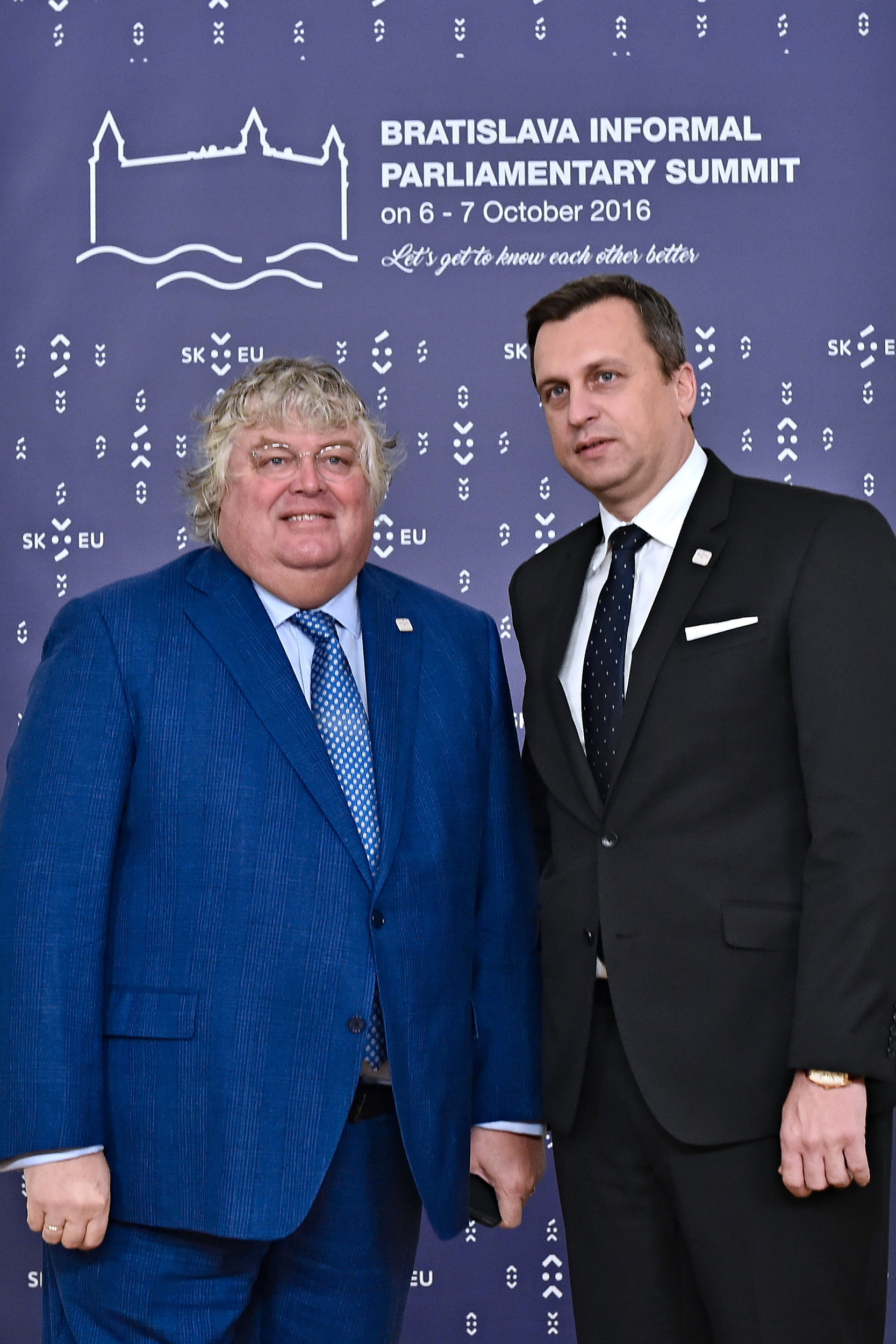
- Ton Elias (left) with Slovakia National Council Speaker Andrej Danko (right), 2016

Member of the House of Representatives
- In office 18 December 2008 – 23 March 2017

Personal details
- Born: 14 March 1955 (age 71) The Hague, Netherlands
- Party: People's Party for Freedom and Democracy
- Education: University of Amsterdam
- Occupation: Politician; Journalist

Ton Maarten Christofoor Elias (born 14 March 1955) is a Dutch businessman, retired politician and former journalist who served as a member of the House of Representatives from 2008 to 2017. As a parliamentarian for the People's Party for Freedom and Democracy (Volkspartij voor Vrijheid en Democratie – VVD), he focused on matters of economic affairs, education and transport.

Born in The Hague, Elias graduated from the University of Amsterdam in 1983. He worked for the TV show Den Haag Vandaag as a political journalist until 1989 and later became communications director of Aegon N.V. before founding two businesses: Elias Advies and Elias Communicatie.

He was number 23 on the VVD list during the general election of 2006 and thus not elected; he entered the States General in 2008 after having sold his companies, as Henk Kamp left the House of Representatives after being appointed to be Rijksvertegenwoordiger voor de openbare lichamen Bonaire, Sint Eustatius en Saba, starting 2009. He was fully elected in the 2010 general election (number 20) and reelected in the general election of 2012. He was the VVD's spokesman on Economic Affairs and later Education, Public Transportation and Traffic. During the Speaker of the House of Representatives election, 2016 he received 51 votes. He came second to the Labour Party candidate Khadija Arib, who received 83 votes and was elected.

For the 2017 general election Elias was not part of the candidacy list of the VVD, which Elias stated he would appeal to the party board. His appeal was supported by Senate President Ankie Broekers-Knol but rejected. He was the House's First Deputy Speaker from 2016 to 2017; he currently works as a consultant. Elias received the Legion of Honour from French Foreign Affairs Minister Jean-Marc Ayrault in November 2016.
