= Gerdi Verbeet =

Dutch politician (born 1951)

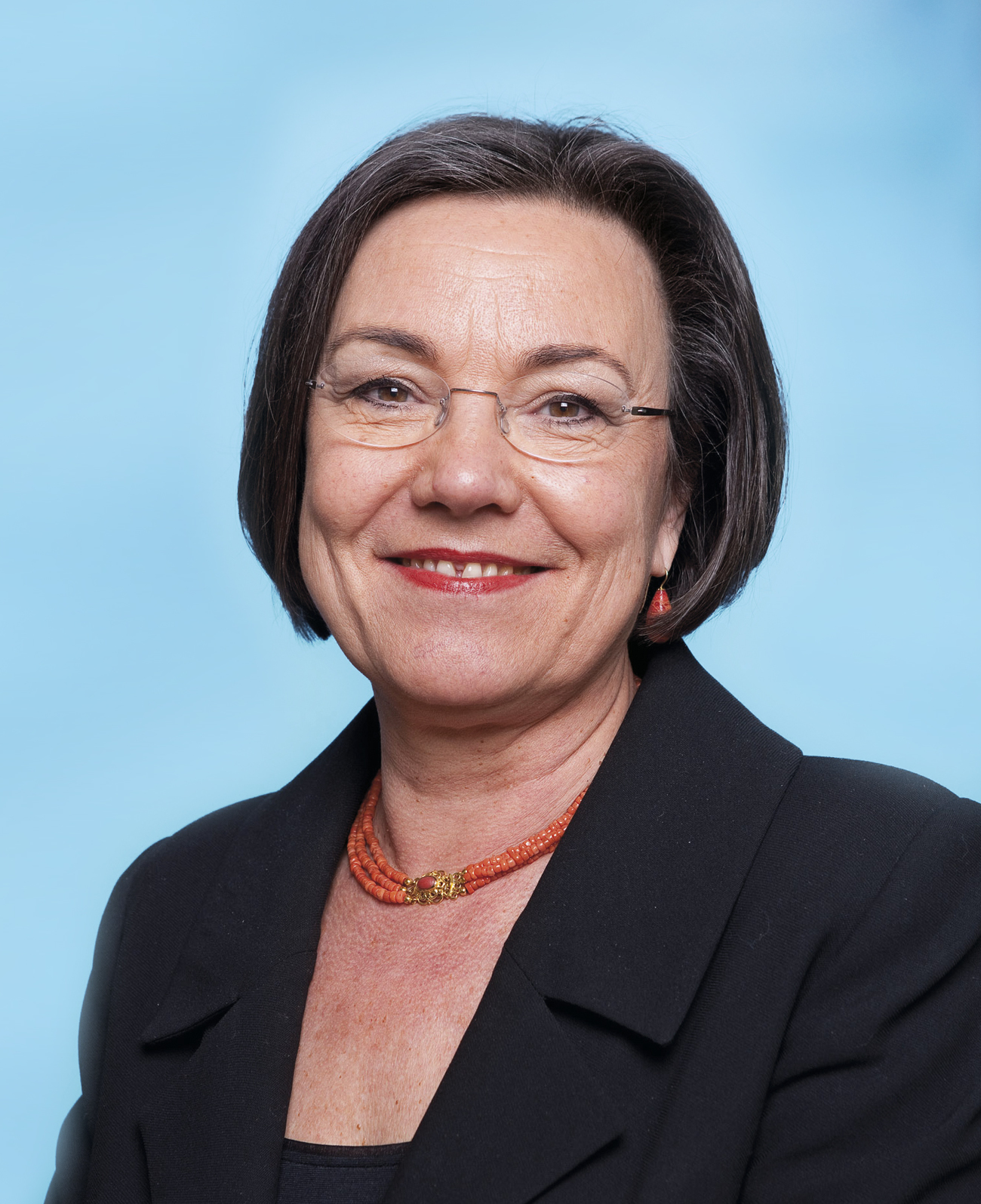
- Verbeet in 2010

Speaker of the House of Representatives
- In office 6 December 2006 – 20 September 2012
- Preceded by: Frans Weisglas
- Succeeded by: Anouchka van Miltenburg

Member of the House of Representatives
- In office 26 July 2002 – 20 September 2012
- In office 11 December 2001 – 23 May 2002

Personal details
- Born: Gerardina Alida Verbeet; 18 April 1951 (age 75) Amsterdam, Netherlands
- Party: Labour Party (1975-2025)
- Spouses: First husband (m. 1981; div. 2004) Wim Meijer (m. 2010)
- Children: 4 (2 stepchildren)
- Occupation: Politician · Civil servant · Political consultant · Nonprofit director · Teacher

Gerardina Alida "Gerdi" Verbeet (born 18 April 1951) is a retired Dutch politician and political consultant who served as Speaker of the House of Representatives from 6 December 2006 to 19 September 2012. A member of the Labour Party (PvdA), she is the second officeholder elected independently by the House of Representatives after her predecessor Frans Weisglas. She served as a member of the House of Representatives from 26 July 2002 to 19 September 2012 and previously from 11 December 2001 until 22 May 2002.

== Biography ==
=== Early life ===
Verbeet attended the gymnasium in Amsterdam and began a study in social geography, which she did not finish. Instead she studied Dutch language and literature and worked as a teacher.

=== Politics ===
Between 1994 and 2001, she was political advisor to State Secretary Tineke Netelenbos and parliamentary leader Ad Melkert.

On 23 May 2001, she became a member of the House of Representatives, filling the vacancy left by Rob van Gijzel. In the general election of 2002 she was not reelected, but in July 2002 she reentered the House of Representatives, filling the vacancy left by Eveline Herfkens. In the Dutch general election of 2003 and 2006 she was able to retain her seat. In the House of Representatives, Verbeet concentrated on sport, policy regarding elderly people, and state pensions.

On 6 December 2006, she was elected Speaker of the House of Representatives, defeating ministers Maria van der Hoeven of the Christian Democratic Appeal and Henk Kamp of the People's Party for Freedom and Democracy. She is the second female Speaker, after Jeltje van Nieuwenhoven, and the second Speaker elected in independent elections, after Frans Weisglas. Verbeet was reelected as Speaker on 22 June 2010, after the general elections of 9 June.

On 2 May 2012, Verbeet made known that she would not stand for re-election as a member of the House of Representatives and speaker for the Dutch general election of 2012 and would retire from active politics.

After leaving the House of Representatives, Verbeet took a seat on the supervisory board of Artis Zoo. She also became president of the Dutch Patients' Consumer Federation (NPCF), as of April 1, 2013, she is president of the Rathenau Institute. On October 1, 2013, she succeeded Onno Ruding as chairman of the Supervisory Board of Het Loo Palace. On December 1, 2014, she joined the supervisory board of Siemens Netherlands. Verbeet succeeded Joan Leemhuis-Stout as president of the National Committee for 4 and 5 May on June 1, 2015. She remained in that position until May 31, 2021, when her six-year appointment expired.

When the Labour Party formed an electoral alliance with GroenLinks in the early 2020s, Verbeet supported Rood Vooruit, an initiative founded in 2023 that has been critical of merger plans. In June 2025 she, together with many other prominent members, left the Labour Party after it adopted a policy denying the state of Israel defensive weapons.

=== Personal life ===
Verbeet is divorced from her first husband and remarried in 2010 with fellow Labour Party politician Wim Meijer after a relationship of three years. She has two sons; two stepdaughters and three grandchildren and lives in Amsterdam.

== Decorations ==
Honours
Ribbon bar	Honour	Country	Date	Comment
	Knight of the Order of Orange-Nassau	Netherlands	19 September 2012	

Political offices
Preceded by Frans Weisglas	Speaker of the House of Representatives; 2006–2012	Succeeded by Anouchka van Miltenburg
Non-profit organization positions
Unknown	Chairwoman of the Rathenau Institute; 2013–present	Incumbent
Preceded by Onno Ruding	Chairwoman of the Het Loo Palace Foundation; 2013–present	Incumbent
Preceded by Joan Leemhuis-Stout	Chairwoman of the National Committee for 4 and 5 May 2015–present	Incumbent
