= Frans Weisglas =

Dutch politician (born 1946)

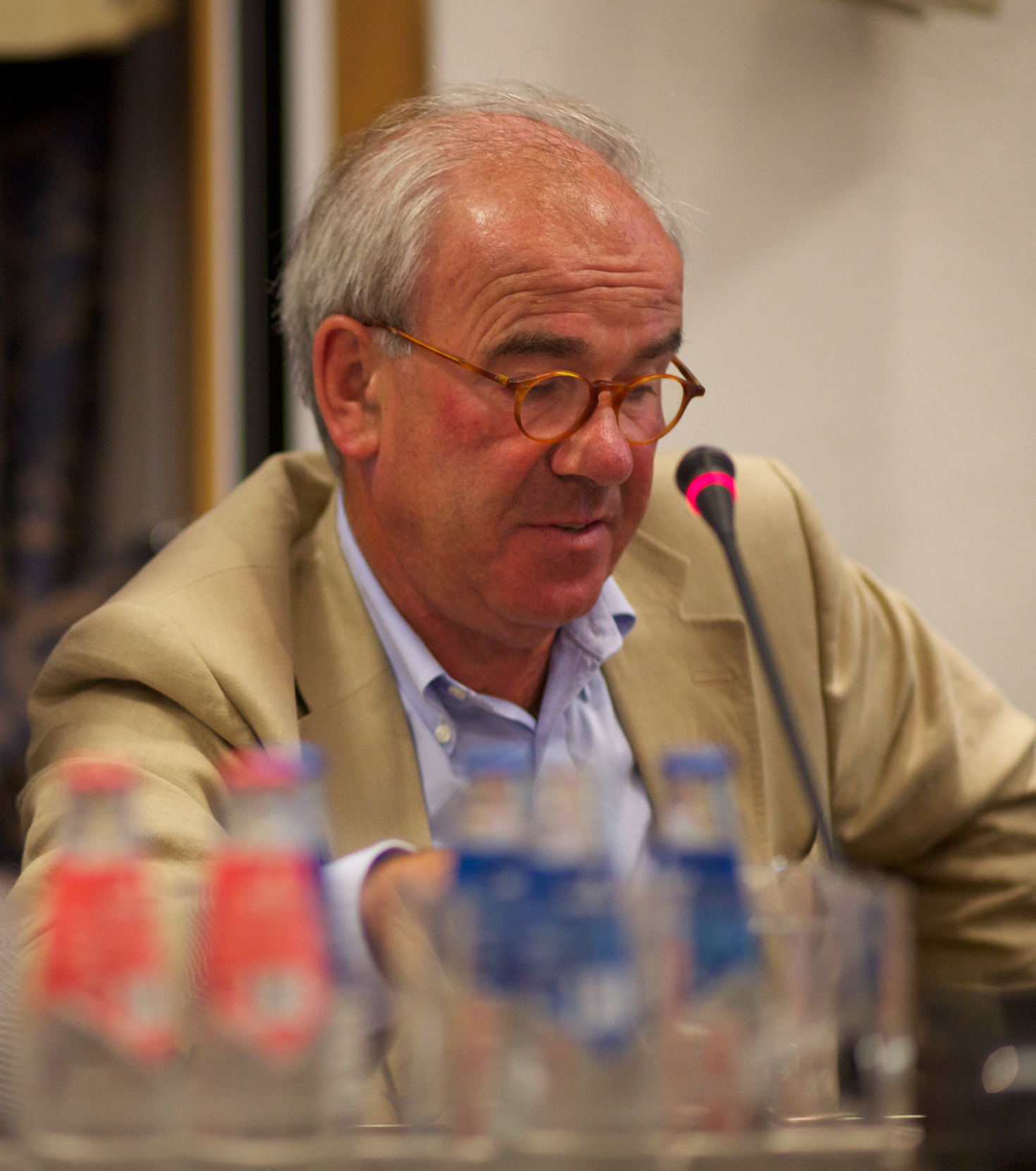
- Weisglas in 2010

Speaker of the House of Representatives
- In office 28 May 2002 – 30 November 2006
- Preceded by: Jeltje van Nieuwenhoven
- Succeeded by: Gerdi Verbeet

Member of the House of Representatives
- In office 16 September 1982 – 30 November 2006

Personal details
- Born: Frans Willy Weisglas; 8 August 1946 (age 80) The Hague, Netherlands
- Party: People's Party for Freedom and Democracy (from 1967)
- Spouse: Nynke Kuperus (m. 1973)
- Education: Erasmus University Rotterdam (Bachelor of Economics, Master of Economics)
- Occupation: Politician · Diplomat · Civil servant · Economist · Nonprofit director · Political pundit
- Website: (in Dutch) fransweisglas.nl

Frans Willy Weisglas (born 8 August 1946) is a retired Dutch politician, diplomat and economist. A member of the People's Party for Freedom and Democracy (VVD), he served as Speaker of the House of Representatives from 16 May 2002 until 30 November 2006. He was a member of the House of Representatives from 16 September 1982 until 30 November 2006.

== Biography ==
=== Early life ===
Weisglas studied economics at the Erasmus University, in Rotterdam, obtaining a degree in 1970.

=== Politics ===
After his graduation, he worked for some years for the Dutch foreign service, being part of the Permanent Mission of the Kingdom of the Netherlands to the United Nations (1970–1977). He then worked as a secretary to the Dutch Minister for Development Cooperation (1978–1981). In 1982, he became an elected member of the House of Representatives, where he focused on foreign and European affairs.

In 2002, Weisglas was elected Speaker of the House, after Jeltje van Nieuwenhoven of the Labour Party stepped down. He was the first Speaker of the House to be elected (and re-elected in 2003) by a democratic vote among parliamentarians without requiring royal approval.

On 15 August 2006 he announced that he would not be a candidate in the 2006 Dutch general election, ending his 24-year-old career as a politician. His last day as Speaker of the House was on 30 November 2006.

=== Trivia ===
He is an ambassador for Terre des hommes.

== Decorations ==
Honours
Ribbon bar	Honour	Country	Date	Comment
	Knight of the Order of the Netherlands Lion	Netherlands	28 April 1995	
	Grand Cross of the Order of the Oak Crown	Luxembourg	24 April 2006	
	Commander of Order of Leopold	Belgium	4 July 2006	
	Grand Cordon of Order of Independence	Jordan	30 October 2006	
	Knight of the Order of Orange-Nassau	Netherlands	29 November 2006	

Political offices
Preceded by Jeltje van Nieuwenhoven	Speaker of the House of Representatives; 2002–2006	Succeeded by Gerdi Verbeet
