= Thom van Campen =

Dutch politician (born 1990)

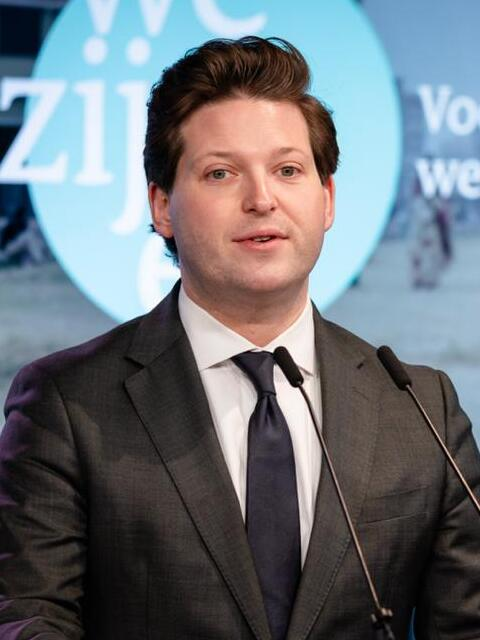
- Van Campen in 2026

Speaker of the House of Representatives
- Incumbent
- Assumed office 18 November 2025
- Preceded by: Martin Bosma

Member of the House of Representatives
- Incumbent
- Assumed office 31 March 2021

Member of the Zwolle Municipal Council
- In office 14 March 2011 – 19 April 2021
- Preceded by: René de Heer
- Succeeded by: Sharareh Azimi Nober

Personal details
- Born: Anthony Albertus Hermance van Campen; 18 January 1990 (age 36) Doetinchem, Netherlands
- Party: VVD (since 2008)
- Domestic partner: Kais Noor
- Education: Windesheim University of Applied Sciences; Vrije Universiteit Amsterdam
- Occupation: Journalist • Politician

Anthony Albertus Hermance "Thom" van Campen (born 18 January 1990) is a Dutch politician who has been serving as the Speaker of the House of Representatives since 18 November 2025. He has also served as a member of the House of Representatives since 2021. A member of the conservative-liberal People's Party for Freedom and Democracy (VVD), he previously held a seat in the Zwolle municipal council (2011–2021) and worked as a political assistant.

== Early life, education and career ==
Van Campen was born in 1990 in Doetinchem, a city in the Achterhoek, as the son of an education director and an entrepreneur. He has an older and a younger sister. He attended the Doetinchem secondary school Ulenhofcollege at havo level between 2002 and 2007. Van Campen studied journalism at the Windesheim University of Applied Sciences in Zwolle, graduating in 2012; he subsequently studied international relations (MSc) at the Vrije Universiteit Amsterdam. Back then, he also served as chief editor of the faculty magazine Essay.

Van Campen became an intern of VVD member of the House of Representatives Malik Azmani in 2014 before he worked as the personal assistant of fellow party member Betty de Boer, whose specialisations in the House of Representatives included railways, between May 2015 and December 2016. Thereafter, Van Campen started working as a strategic adviser at ProRail's public affairs department. He left ProRail in October 2017 to take a job as political adviser of Tamara van Ark, State Secretary for Social Affairs and Employment. Van Campen kept working for Van Ark when she became Minister for Medical Care in July 2020.

== Politics ==
Van Campen became a member of the VVD in 2008 and first appeared on the ballot, aged twenty, in the 2010 municipal elections as the VVD's seventh candidate in Zwolle. He was not elected, but the VVD did appoint him to the position duoraadslid. He succeeded VVD councilor René de Heer in March 2011, when he became an alderman, making Van Campen the youngest member of the Zwolle municipal council. He left his internship at the Nederlandse Omroep Stichting (NOS) in Brussels after one month because of his appointment. Van Campen's specialization in the council was culture policy.

He was re-elected in the 2014 municipal elections, in which he appeared fifth on the VVD's party list. In 2016, a proposal by Van Campen and a D66 councilor passed the municipal council for an experiment that allowed bars in Zwolle to be open the entire night. It eventually led to those rules becoming permanent in 2018. Van Campen became the VVD's caucus leader in August 2016 and was re-elected as his party's lead candidate – the youngest in the Zwolle VVD's history – in the 2018 municipal elections.

=== House of Representatives (2021–present) ===
Van Campen ran for member of parliament in the 2021 general election, being placed sixteenth on the VVD's party list. He received 2,821 preference votes and was sworn in as House member on 31 March. Van Campen vacated his seat in the Zwolle municipal council the following month. In the House, he is the VVD's spokesperson for agriculture, food quality, the Food and Consumer Product Safety Authority (NVWA), reactive nitrogen, and health care prevention.

Van Campen was one of the lijstduwers of the VVD in Zwolle in the 2022 municipal election. In the House, he proposed that same year to force the permanent closing of slaughterhouses after multiple violations of animal welfare regulations. As agricultural spokesperson, Van Campen was also involved in discussions about reactive nitrogen emissions, which the coalition consisting of the VVD had agreed to significantly reduce to improve the quality of nature reserves following a decision by the Council of State. During a party congress, members passed a motion with 51% of the vote to call on the VVD's House caucus to adjust cabinet plans to achieve these goals out of fear that they would harm the livability of rural areas. Van Campen had advised against the motion, disagreeing with its assumption that outdated techniques were being used to calculate emissions. In June 2022, counter-terrorism unit NCTV recommended Van Campen and several other members of parliament to stay away from a farmers' protest in Stroe due to safety concerns. Van Campen subsequently criticized House members who did attend, saying that a unified reaction from politicians to these threats would have been more comradely.

Van Campen served as the VVD's vice caucus leader during the maternity leave of Bente Becker. Following the 2023 general election, Van Campen kept agriculture in his portfolio while Europe was added to it.

=== House committees ===
==== 2021–2023 term ====
- Committee for Agriculture, Nature and Food Quality
- Committee for Health, Welfare and Sport
- Committee for Infrastructure and Water Management.
- Delegation to the Benelux Parliament

==== 2023–2025 term ====
- Committee for European Affairs
- Committee for Agriculture, Fisheries, Food Security and Nature (vice chair)
- Committee for Infrastructure and Water Management
- Contact group Belgium
- Delegation to the Benelux Parliament

== Personal life ==
Van Campen lives in Zwolle and has a boyfriend. He was raised in a Reformed Protestant family. Aged 17, he made his profession of faith in the Protestant Church in the Netherlands, and he has remained a member.

== Electoral history ==
Electoral history of Thom van Campen
Year	Body	Party	Pos.	Votes	Result		Ref.
Year	Body	Party	Pos.	Votes	Party seats	Individual	Ref.
2021	House of Representatives	People's Party for Freedom and Democracy	16	2,821	34	Won	
2023	House of Representatives	People's Party for Freedom and Democracy	14	2,879	24	Won	
2025	House of Representatives	People's Party for Freedom and Democracy	11	4,181	22	Won	

== Honours ==
- Japan:
  - Grand Cordon of the Order of the Rising Sun (17 June 2026)
