= Jeltje van Nieuwenhoven =

Dutch librarian and politician (born 1943)

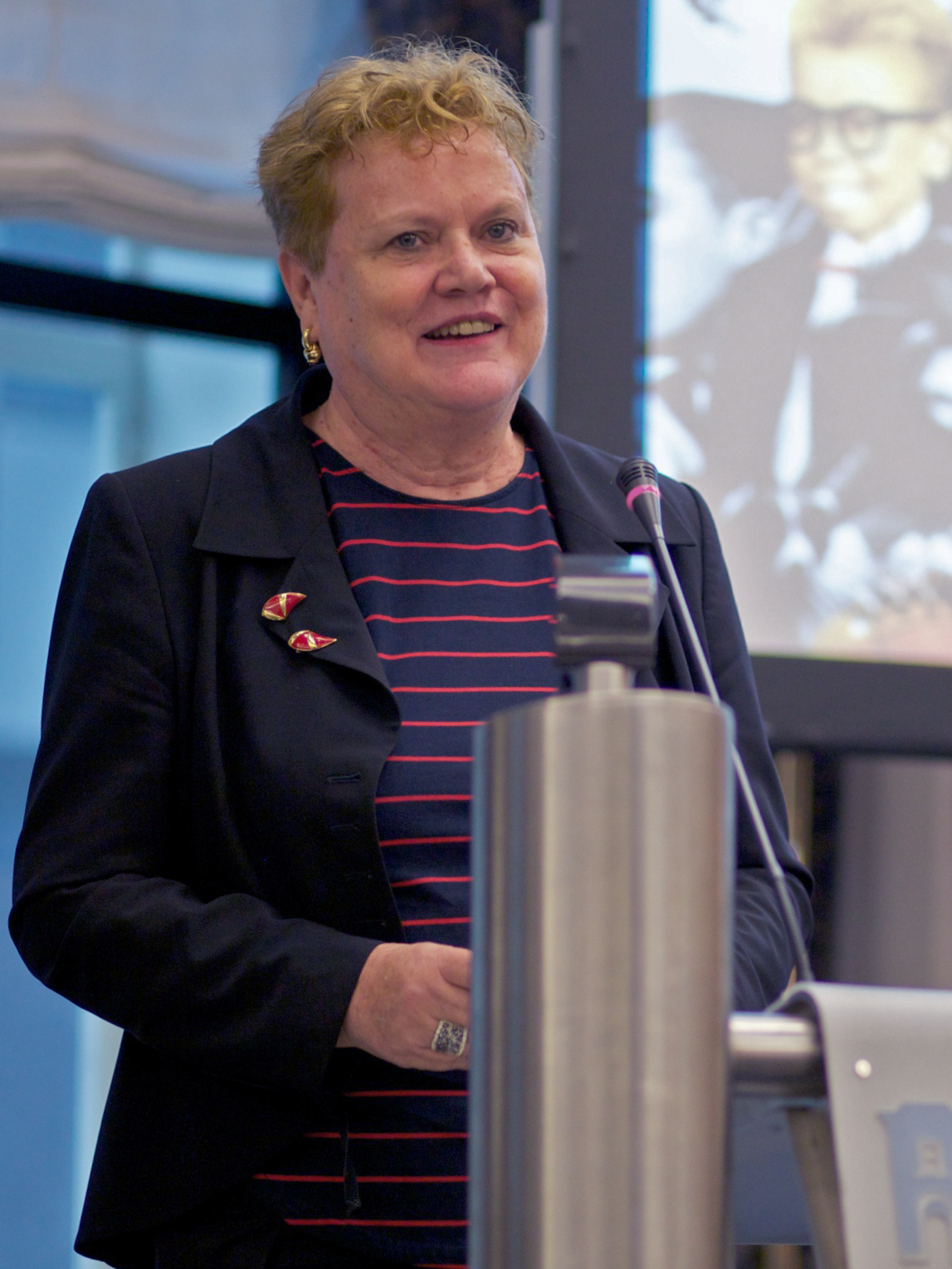
- Van Nieuwenhoven in 2010

Parliamentary leader in the House of Representatives
- In office 16 May 2002 – 19 November 2002
- Preceded by: Ad Melkert
- Succeeded by: Wouter Bos
- Parliamentary group: Labour Party

Speaker of the House of Representatives
- In office 20 May 1998 – 16 May 2002
- Preceded by: Piet Bukman
- Succeeded by: Frans Weisglas

Member of the House of Representatives
- In office 16 June 1983 – 27 October 2004
- In office 15 September 1981 – 16 September 1982
- Parliamentary group: Labour Party

Personal details
- Born: Jeltje van Nieuwenhoven; 2 August 1943 (age 83) Noordwolde, Netherlands
- Party: Labour Party (from 1970) GroenLinks (from 2022)
- Occupation: Politician · Civil servant · Nonprofit director · Art historian · Librarian

Jeltje van Nieuwenhoven (born 2 August 1943) is a retired Dutch politician of the Labour Party (PvdA) and librarian.

== Biography ==
=== Before entering politics ===
Jeltje van Nieuwenhoven was born in Noordwolde in the Frisian municipality of Weststellingwerf. Her father was a carpenter. She went to a public elementary school in Noordwolde. After obtaining her MULO, specialising in the arts, she studied to become librarian. Between 1960 and 1979, she was librarian. First for the local library in Wolvega and the provincial library of Friesland, but in 1966 she began to work at the Institute for the History of Art of the University of Utrecht. In the meantime, she had become a member of the PvdA. In 1974, she became librarian at the scientific foundation of the PvdA, the Wiardi Beckman Foundation. She also became treasurer of the Vinkeveen branch of the party. In 1976, she joined the political working group of the women's movement within the PvdA, the Red Women (Rooie Vrouwen). In 1978, she was elected to the local legislative in Vinkeveen and she immediately became a member of the local executive. In 1979 she became personal assistant to the chairman of the PvdA, Max van den Berg.

=== Political life ===
In the 1981 elections, Van Nieuwenhoven was elected into the House of Representatives. In the 1982 election Van Nieuwenhoven was not elected, having been placed in an ineligible position. Instead she joined the PvdA board. In 1983 she entered parliament however because a member of the PvdA resigned from parliament She would remain a member of parliament until 2004.

As member of parliament she held several positions within the party: in the period 1990–96 she was a member of the Curatorium of the Wiardi Beckman Foundation, where she had been librarian; between 1997 and 2001 she served on the party board. In 1995 she was made a Knight of the Order of the Dutch Lion.

In parliament she showed a particular interest the Netherlands Public Broadcasting, media and culture, and was the party's spokesperson on these matters. Belonging to the left wing of the PvdA, she is known for her ardent feminism. In 1985 she voted, against the majority of her parliamentary party, for the Beckers motion which would have removed all nuclear weapons from the Netherlands and in 1997 she voted for the Rouvoet motion to allow the Gümüs family to remain in the Netherlands, once more against the majority of her parliamentary party. Both motions failed. She was chairperson of the committee for Women's emancipation between 1989 and 1994 and of the committee for Health, Welfare and Sports between 1994 and 1998.

As a prominent member of parliament, Van Nieuwenhoven held several positions within the world of the arts. She was on the board of the foundation for the Festival of Stories in Amsterdam, between 1989 and 1994. She was chairperson of the board of the Combined Theaters in Amsterdam between 1992 and 2002. She also sat on the board of the Amstel Foundation for Youth Theatre in the same period. Furthermore, she was a member of the board of the Dutch Film Festival and chaired that of the VSB Poetry Prize.

In 1998, she was elected Speaker of the House of Representatives, becoming the first woman to have this function. In 2002 she did not stand for reelection and instead became chairperson ad interim of her own parliamentary party, which was a considerable crisis, after losing the elections. In November 2002 she stood for election of chairperson and top candidate for her own party, but was convincingly beaten by Wouter Bos. Van Nieuwenhoven came second (with a 30% margin) and was second candidate and first woman on the PvdA list. She became the vice-chair of the parliamentary party, responsible for internal affairs.

=== Retirement from politics and subsequent return ===
In 2004 she left parliament to become a member of the provincial executive of South Holland. In 2006 she resigned from this post for health reasons. In 2005 she was rewarded with the Golden Pin of the PvdA, which had previously been given only to Joop den Uyl and Max van der Stoel. She currently chairs the committee that will select and assess prospective parliamentary candidates for the PvdA. Van Nieuwenhoven still holds several functions in the Dutch arts world: she is chairperson of the National Theatre, a member of the academy for the Golden Goosefeather (an art prize), and of the advisory board of the Institut Néerlandais and the Kröller-Müller Museum. In October 2009, she came back from retirement to become candidate for the PvdA leadership in The Hague. On 23 October she was confirmed to lead the PvdA into The Hague local election in 2010.

== Electoral history ==
Incomplete overview of Dutch elections Jeltje van Nieuwenhoven participated in
Election	Party	Candidate number	Votes
1989 Dutch general election	Labour Party		
1994 Dutch general election	Labour Party	17	2.432
1998 Dutch general election	Labour Party	25	1.470
2002 Dutch general election	Labour Party	2	233.374
2003 Dutch general election	Labour Party	2	215.715
2012 Dutch general election	Labour Party		139
2014 Dutch municipal elections in The Hague	Labour Party	3	4.881
2017 Dutch general election	Labour Party	78	44
2018 Dutch municipal elections in The Hague	Labour Party	26	539
2021 Dutch general election	Labour Party	50	123
2022 Dutch municipal elections in The Hague	Labour Party	47	
2026 The Hague municipal election	Labour Party	49	116

== Decorations ==
Honours
Ribbon bar	Honour	Country	Date	Comment
	Knight of the Order of the Netherlands Lion	Netherlands	30 April 1995	
	Dame Grand Cross of the Order of Isabella the Catholic	Spain	2002	
	Commander of the Order of Orange-Nassau	Netherlands	27 October 2004	

Party political offices
Preceded by Ad Melkert	Parliamentary leader of the Labour Party in the House of Representatives; 2002	Succeeded by Wouter Bos
Political offices
Preceded by Piet Bukman	Speaker of the House of Representatives; 1998–2002	Succeeded by Frans Weisglas
Non-profit organization positions
Preceded by Office established	Chairwoman of the Dutch Cinema Commission; 2006–2007	Succeeded by Office discontinued
