= Speaker of the House of Representatives (Netherlands) =

Elected member leading the meetings of the House of Representatives of the Netherlands

- Voorzitter van de Tweede Kamer der Staten-Generaal
- Coat of arms of the House of Representatives

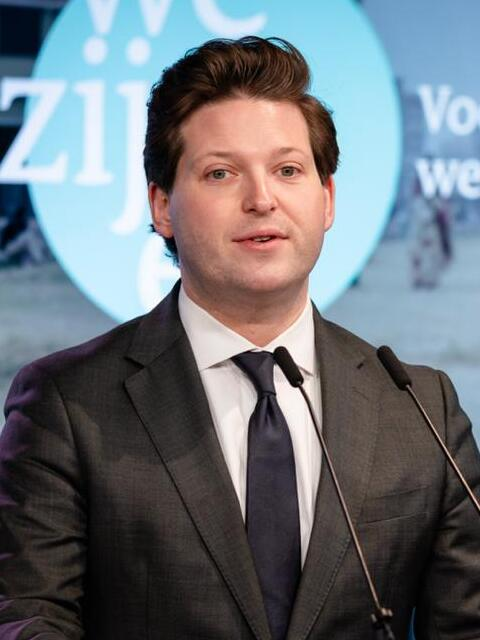
- Incumbent; Thom van Campen since 18 November 2025
- Style: Mister Speaker (informal); His Excellency (diplomatic)
- Member of: Presidium of the House of Representatives
- Term length: No term limit until the end of the parliamentary term of the House of Representatives
- Constituting instrument: Constitution of the Netherlands
- Formation: 21 September 1815; 210 years ago
- First holder: Jan Elias Nicolaas van Lynden van Hoevelaken
- Deputy: Deputy Speakers
- Salary: €126,975.48 annually (including €7,887.24 expenses)
- Website: www.houseofrepresentatives.nl/members-parliament/president-house

The speaker of the House of Representatives (Dutch: voorzitter van de Tweede Kamer), also known as the president or chair, is the presiding officer of the House of Representatives, the lower chamber of the States General of the Netherlands. Elected from among its 150 members, the speaker leads the meetings of the House and chairs its presidium and procedure committee. Prior to the 1982 constitutional revision, the speaker was appointed by the Crown, who usually followed the recommendations of the House.

== Duties ==
As a member of the House of Representatives, the speaker has the same rights and obligations as other members. The speaker leads the meetings of the House. The officeholder opens and closes the meetings and determines who speaks. The members of the House, as well as Ministers and State Secretaries are not supposed to address each other directly, but always address the speaker instead, as a method to encourage civility. While the speaker also takes part in the voting (as a regular member of the House of Representatives), the officeholder typically does not participate in debates.

Besides leading the meetings, the speaker represents the House of Representatives as a whole, such as in ceremonies and with visits by foreign heads of state. The speaker is also the chair of the Presidium, which is responsible for determining the budget of the House, setting its agenda and appointing its staff.

The speaker is supported by deputy speakers, ranked by number in order of precedence, which also are members of the House. If the speaker is unable to fulfill their duties or the position becomes vacant, then the meeting is chaired by the first deputy speaker. The speaker has a seat with a backrest that is higher than the other seats in the House.

== Election ==
The speaker is elected by the members of the House of Representatives. Such an election takes place shortly after a general election or after the position became vacant. The House adopts a profile that outlines the desired qualities that potential candidates should have, such as prior experience and personal traits. The profile is not binding, however. Members can submit their candidacy, but this is not required.

The election itself requires the participation of at least 76 members. To win the election, a Member needs to obtain an absolute majority of the votes cast (more than 50%). The voting takes place by open and secret ballot, which means that Members have to write down the name of the preferred Member themselves and that the vote is not disclosed. Members can choose between writing down the name of one of the candidates, the name of any other Member (whether they are standing or not), something invalid or nothing at all.

An election requires multiple voting rounds when no member wins an absolute majority. If there is no winner after two rounds, the rules of voting are different. In the third round, the list of members who were voted for in the second round is definitive. In addition, the number of eligible members is limited, depending on the number of members who received votes in the second round. If fewer than five members received votes then all members except the two frontrunners are eliminated from the election, otherwise only four frontrunners remain. In the fourth round, only the two frontrunners are eligible, any other votes are deemed invalid. If both members have the same number of votes, the election is decided by lot.

== Members of the Presidium ==
Position	Portrait	Name	Group	Service in the Presidium	Service in the House of Representatives
Speaker	Thom van Campen	Thom van Campen (born 1990)	VVD	15 May 2025 (1 year, 116 days)	31 March 2021 (5 years, 161 days)
First Deputy Speaker	Wieke Paulusma	Wieke Paulusma (born 1978)	D66	19 December 2023 (2 years, 263 days)	15 April 2021 (5 years, 146 days)
Second Deputy Speaker	Geert Wilders	Geert Wilders (born 1963)	PVV	20 November 2025 (292 days)	26 July 2002 (24 years, 44 days)
Third Deputy Speaker	Marjolein Moorman	Marjolein Moorman (born 1974)	GL/PvdA	20 November 2025 (292 days)	12 November 2025 (300 days)
Fourth Deputy Speaker	Harmen Krul	Harmen Krul (born 1994)	CDA	20 November 2025 (292 days)	7 February 2023 (3 years, 213 days)
Fifth Deputy Speaker		Joost Eerdmans (born 1971)	JA21	20 November 2025 (292 days)	31 March 2021 (5 years, 161 days)
Sixth Deputy Speaker	Ingrid Michon	Ingrid Michon (born 1976)	VVD	20 November 2025 (292 days)	31 March 2021 (5 years, 161 days)

== See also ==
- List of speakers of the House of Representatives (Netherlands)
- List of Speaker of the House of Representatives elections (Netherlands)
- President of the Senate (Netherlands)
