= Napoleon's planned invasion of the United Kingdom =

Planned French invasion of Britain

- Part of the Napoleonic Wars
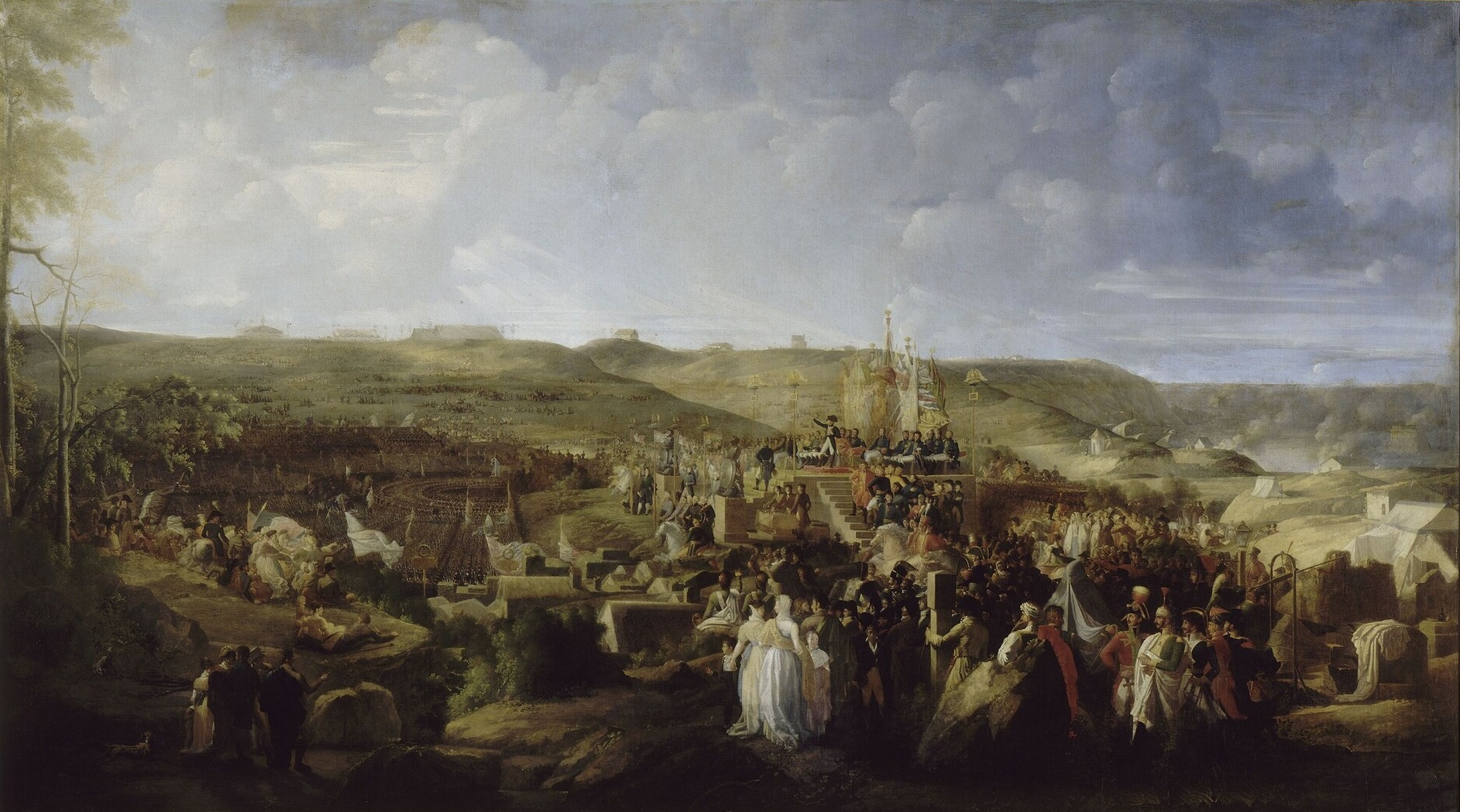
- 1806 painting of Napoleon distributing the Legion of Honour at the Camp of Boulogne on 16 August 1804
- Location: Camp of Boulogne, France
- Planned by: Napoleon
- Commanded by: Napoleon; Étienne Eustache Bruix; Pierre-Charles Villeneuve; Honoré Joseph Antoine Ganteaume; Carel Hendrik Ver Huell
- Objective: Invade and occupy Britain
- Date: 1803–1805
- Executed by: First French Empire; Spain; Batavian Republic
- Outcome: Called off

Napoleon's planned invasion of the United Kingdom at the start of the War of the Third Coalition, although never carried out, was a major influence on British naval strategy and the fortification of the coast of South East England. In 1796 the French had already tried to invade Ireland in order to destabilise the United Kingdom or as a stepping-stone to Great Britain. The first French Army of England had gathered on the Channel coast in 1798, but an invasion of England was sidelined by Napoleon's concentration on the campaigns in Egypt and against Austria, and shelved in 1802 by the Peace of Amiens. Building on planning for mooted invasions under France's ancien régime in 1744, 1759, and 1779, preparations began again in earnest soon after the outbreak of war in 1803, and were finally called off in 1805, before the Battle of Trafalgar.

== French preparations ==
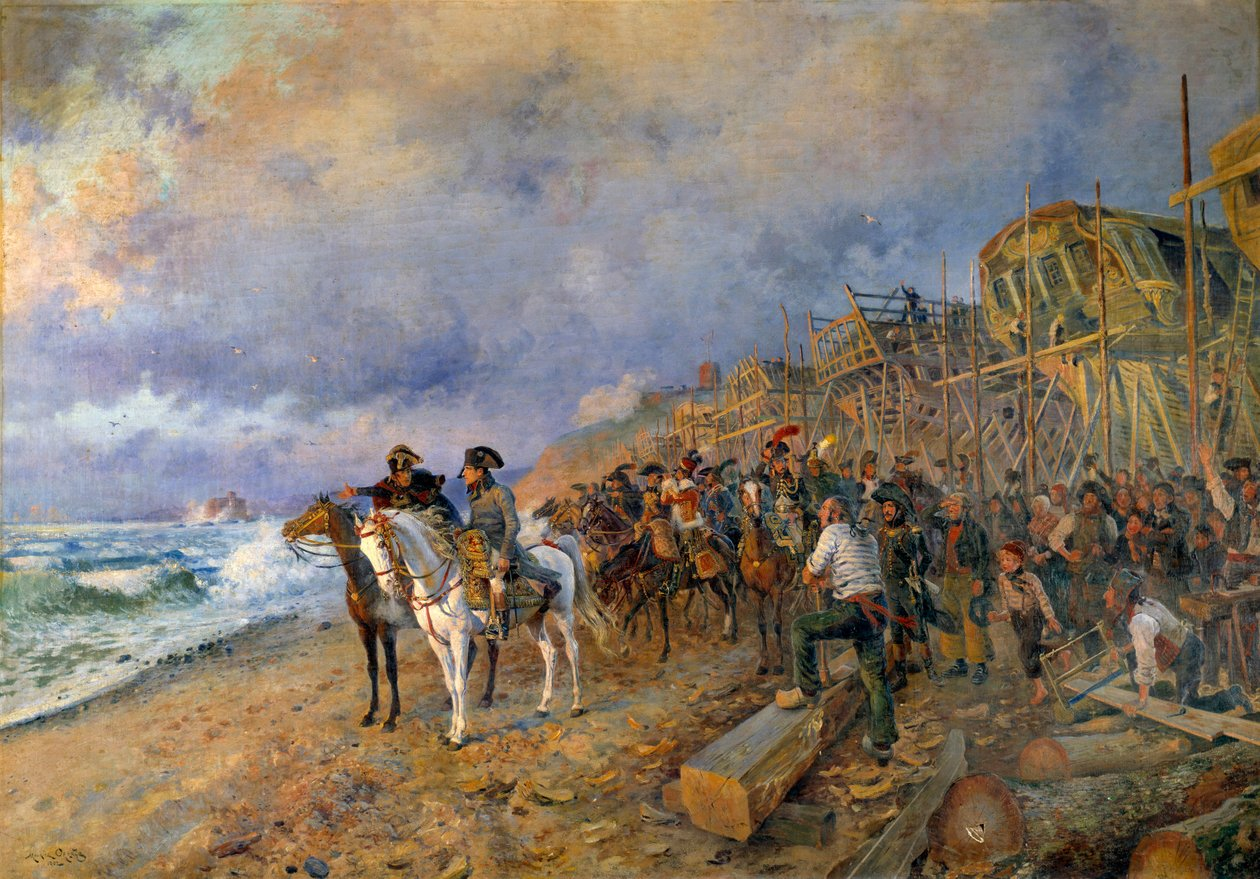
The First Consul Napoleon Bonaparte Visits the Arsenal of Boulogne, Maurice Orange

From 1803 to 1805 a new army of 200,000 men, known as the Armée des côtes de l'Océan (Army of the Ocean Coasts) or the Armée d'Angleterre (Army of England), was gathered and trained at camps at Boulogne, Bruges, and Montreuil. A large "National Flotilla" of invasion barges was built in Channel ports along the coasts of France and the Netherlands (then under French domination as the Batavian Republic), all the way from Étaples to Flushing, and gathered at Boulogne. This flotilla was initially under the energetic command of Admiral Étienne Eustache Bruix, but he soon had to return to Paris, where he died of tuberculosis in March 1805. The part of the flotilla built by the Batavian Navy was under the command of Vice-Admiral Carel Hendrik Ver Huell. He moved the Batavian flotilla from Vlissingen to Boulogne, despite British attempts to prevent this.

Port facilities at Boulogne were improved (even though its tides made it unsuitable for such a role) and forts built, whilst the discontent and boredom that often threatened to overflow among the waiting troops was allayed by constant training and frequent ceremonial visits by Napoleon himself (including the first ever awards of the Légion d'honneur). A medal was struck and a triumphal column erected at Boulogne to celebrate the invasion's anticipated success. However, when Napoleon ordered a large-scale test of the invasion craft despite choppy weather and against the advice of his naval commanders such as Admiral Charles René Magon de Médine (commander of the flotilla's right wing), they were shown up as ill-designed for their task and, though Napoleon led rescue efforts in person, many men were lost.

Cartoon on the invasion, showing a tunnel under the English Channel and a fleet of balloons

Napoleon also seriously considered using a fleet of troop-carrying balloons as part of his proposed invasion force, and appointed Sophie Blanchard as an air service chief, though she said the proposed aerial invasion would fail because of the winds. (France's first military balloon had been used in 1794 by Jean-Marie Coutelle.) Though an aerial invasion proved a dead-end, the prospect of one captured the minds of the British print media and public.

These preparations were financed by the Louisiana Purchase of 1803, whereby France ceded her huge North American territories to the United States in return for a payment of 50 million French francs ($11,250,000). The entire amount was spent on the projected invasion. The United States had partly funded the purchase by means of a loan from Baring Brothers of London, which essentially meant that a British bank was indirectly funding an invasion of the country.

For his planned subsidiary invasion of Ireland, Napoleon had formed an Irish Legion in 1803, to create an indigenous part of his 20,000-man Corps d'Irelande.

== British countermeasures ==
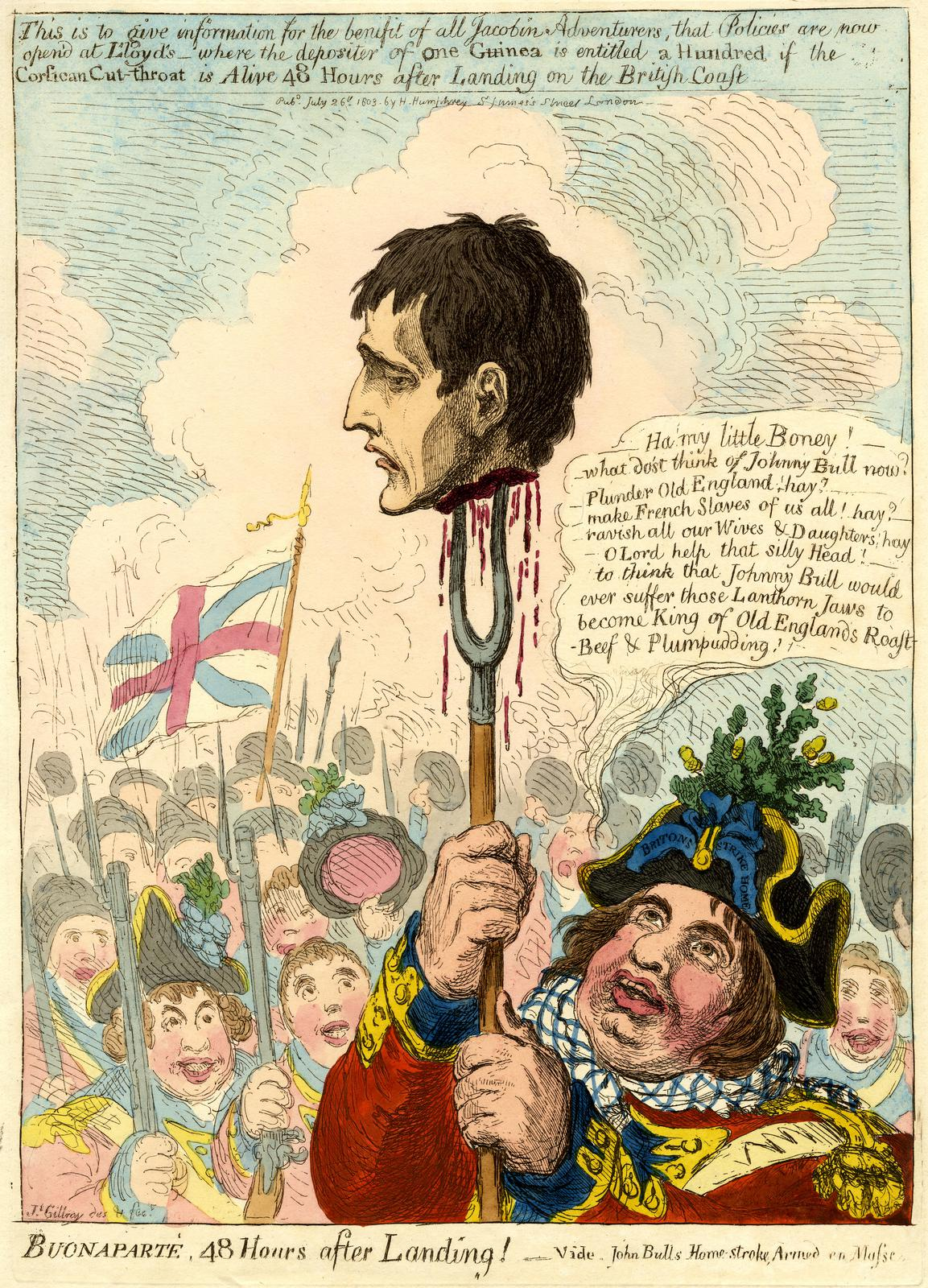
Buonaparte, 48 hours after landing. John Bull, a national personification of England, holds the head of Napoleon after a conjectured French invasion. 1803 caricature by James Gillray

Though the fleet-test was unsuccessful, Britain continued to be on high alert with defences from invasion. With the flotilla and encampment at Boulogne visible from the south coast of England, Martello towers were built along the English coast to counter the invasion threat, and militias were raised. In the areas closest to France, new fortifications were built, and existing ones previously built to guard against the 1779 invasion were completed or improved. Dover Castle had tunnels added to garrison more troops; the Dover Western Heights were constructed (with a Grand Shaft to deploy its troops from its hilltop site to sea level rapidly should there be a landing), and the Royal Military Canal was cut to impede Napoleon's progress into England should he land on Romney Marsh. Unfounded rumours of a massive flat French invasion raft powered by windmills and paddle-wheels, a secretly-dug channel tunnel, and an invasion fleet of balloons, spread via the print media, as did caricatures ridiculing the prospect of invasion. A naval raid on Boulogne was also carried out in October 1804, and British fleets continued to blockade the French and Spanish fleets that would be needed to maintain naval superiority long enough for a crossing.

== Naval plan ==
Before the flotilla could cross, however, Napoleon had to gain naval control of the English Channel – in his own words, "Let us be masters of the Channel for six hours and we are masters of the world." He envisaged doing this by having the Brest and Toulon Franco–Spanish fleets break out from the British blockade (led at Brest by Baron Collingwood and at Toulon by Lord Nelson), and then sail across the Atlantic to threaten the West Indies. This, he hoped, would draw off the Royal Navy force under William Cornwallis defending the Western Approaches. The Toulon and Brest fleets (under Admirals Pierre-Charles Villeneuve and Honoré Joseph Antoine Ganteaume respectively) could then rendezvous at Martinique, quickly sail back across the Atlantic to Europe (losing both these pursuing British fleets en route), land a force in Ireland (as in the two French Revolutionary invasions of Ireland in 1796 and 1798) and, more importantly, defeat what parts of the Channel Fleet had remained in the Channel, take control of the Channel, and defend and transport the invasion force, all before the pursuing fleets could return to stop them.

This plan was typical of Napoleon in its dash and reliance on fast movement and surprise, but such a style was more suited to land than to sea warfare, with the vagaries of tide and wind and the effective British blockade making it ever more impractical and unlikely to succeed as time passed. Only the Toulon force eventually broke out (on 29 March 1805) and, though it managed to cross the Atlantic, it did not find the Brest fleet at the rendezvous and so sailed back to Europe alone, where it was met by the force blockading Rochefort and Ferrol (where invasion vessels had been prepared), was defeated at the Battle of Cape Finisterre, and forced back into port. Therefore, on 27 August 1805, Napoleon used the invasion army as the core of the new Grande Armée and had it break camp and march eastwards to begin the Ulm campaign. Thus, by the time of the Battle of Trafalgar on 21 October, the invasion had already been called off, and so this battle further guaranteed British control of the Channel rather than preventing the invasion. The comment attributed to First Lord of the Admiralty Lord St. Vincent – "I do not say they [the French] cannot come – I only say they cannot come by sea" – had been proved right.

== Memorial ==
Today, the Boulogne camp's site is marked by a 53 metres (174 ft) high column (the tallest of such columns in France), built in the 1850s, with a statue of Napoleon on top, panels on the base showing him presenting medals of the Légion d'honneur to his troops and surrounded by railings decorated with the golden French Imperial Eagle. The arsenal from the camp is also preserved.

== Gallery ==
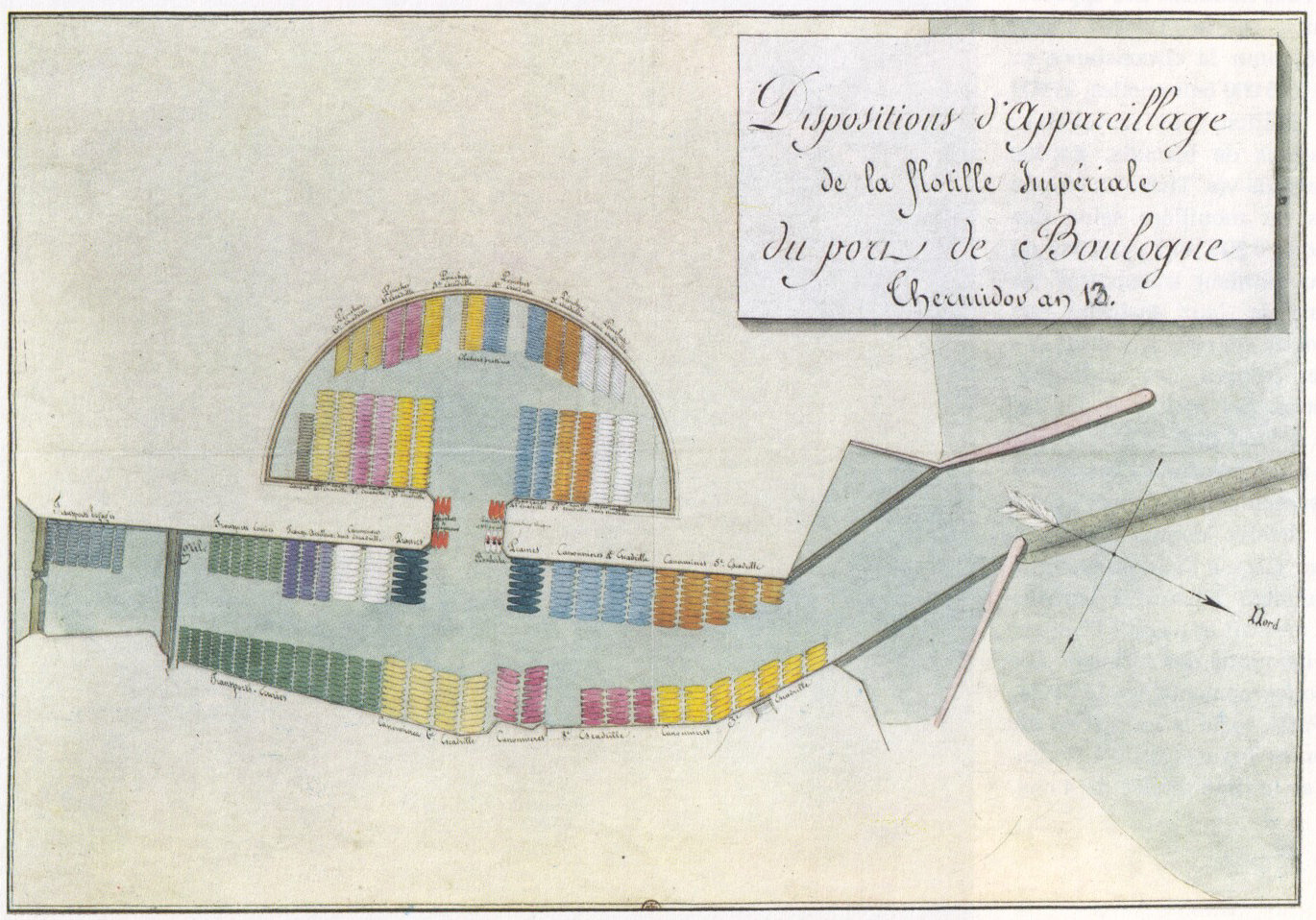
Disposition of the French flotilla

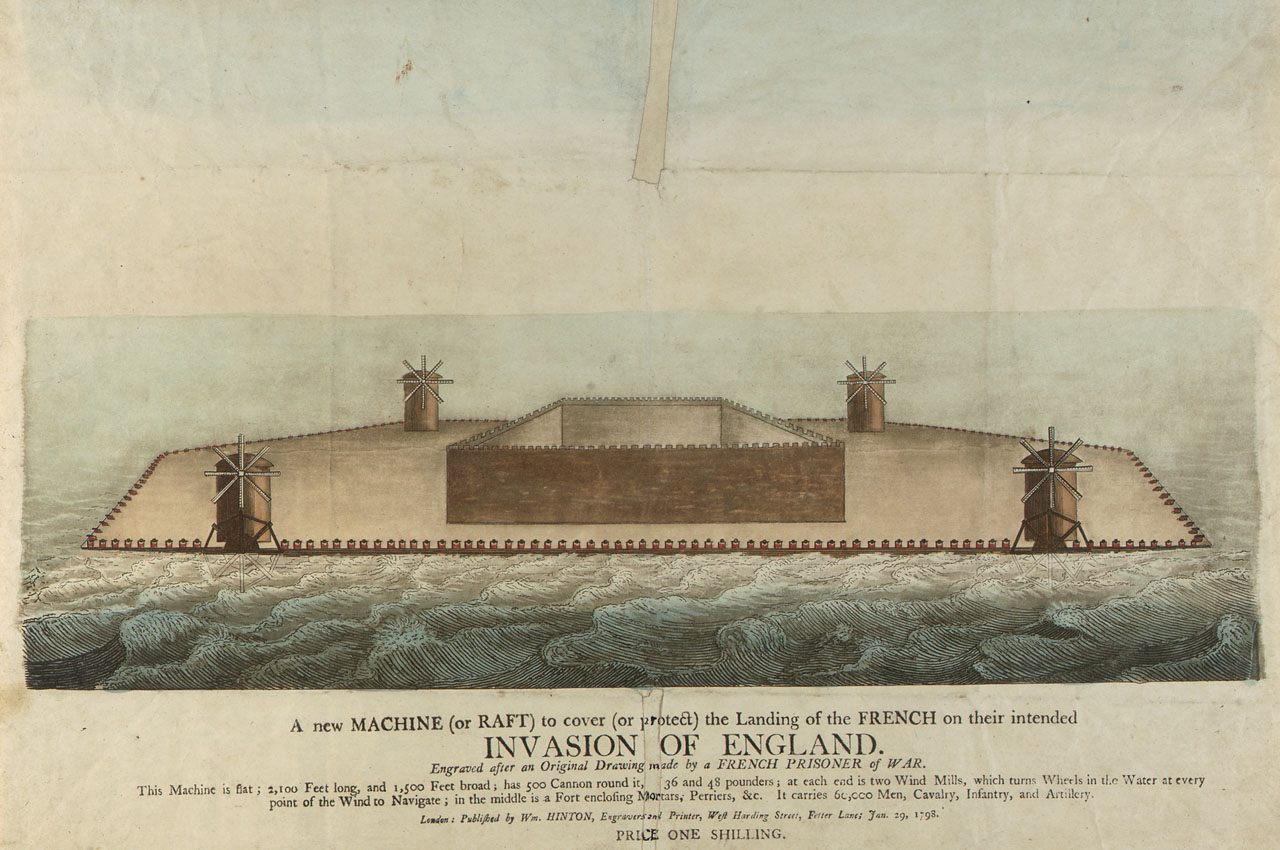
The rumoured French invasion raft

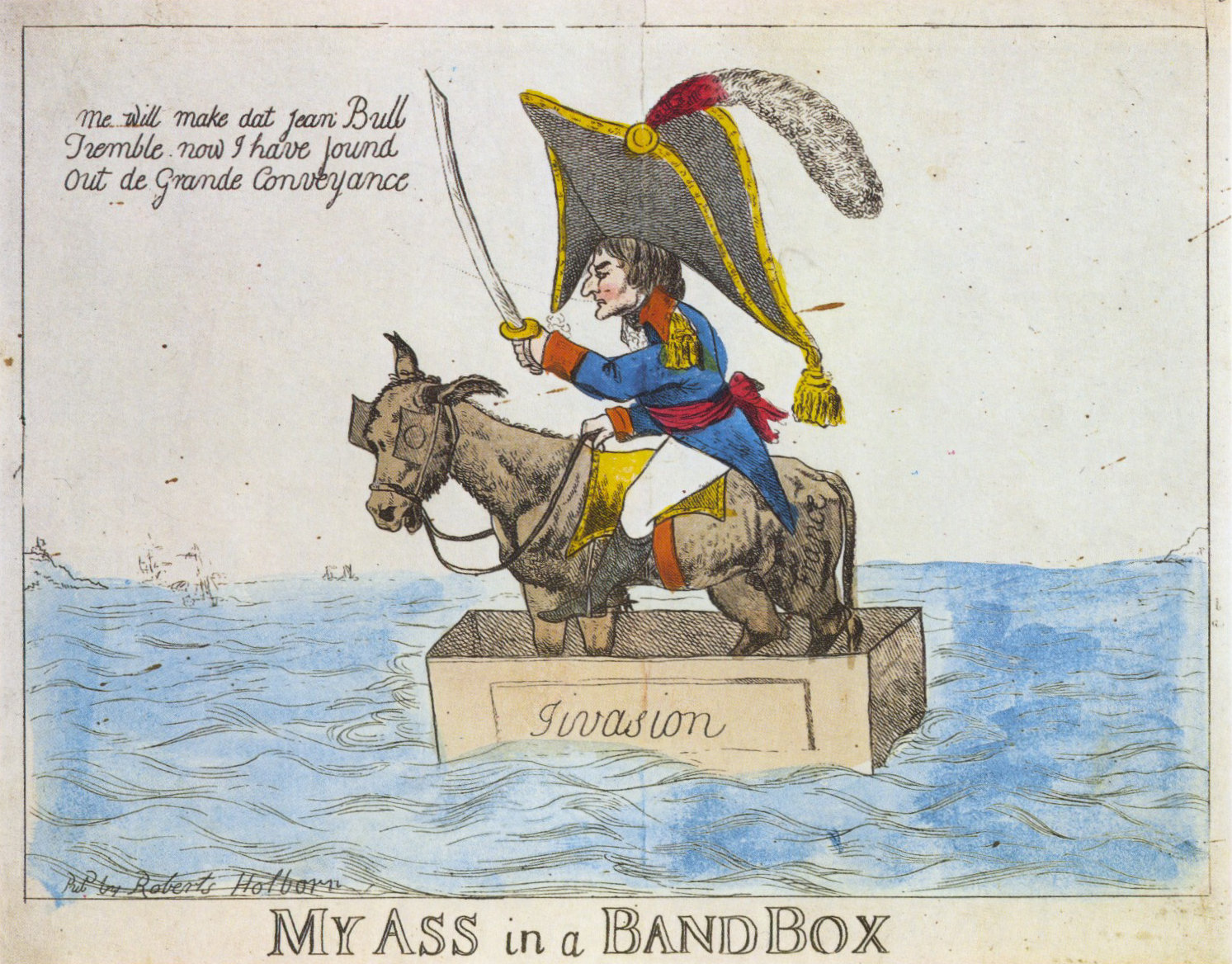
Caricature mocking the fragile landing rafts

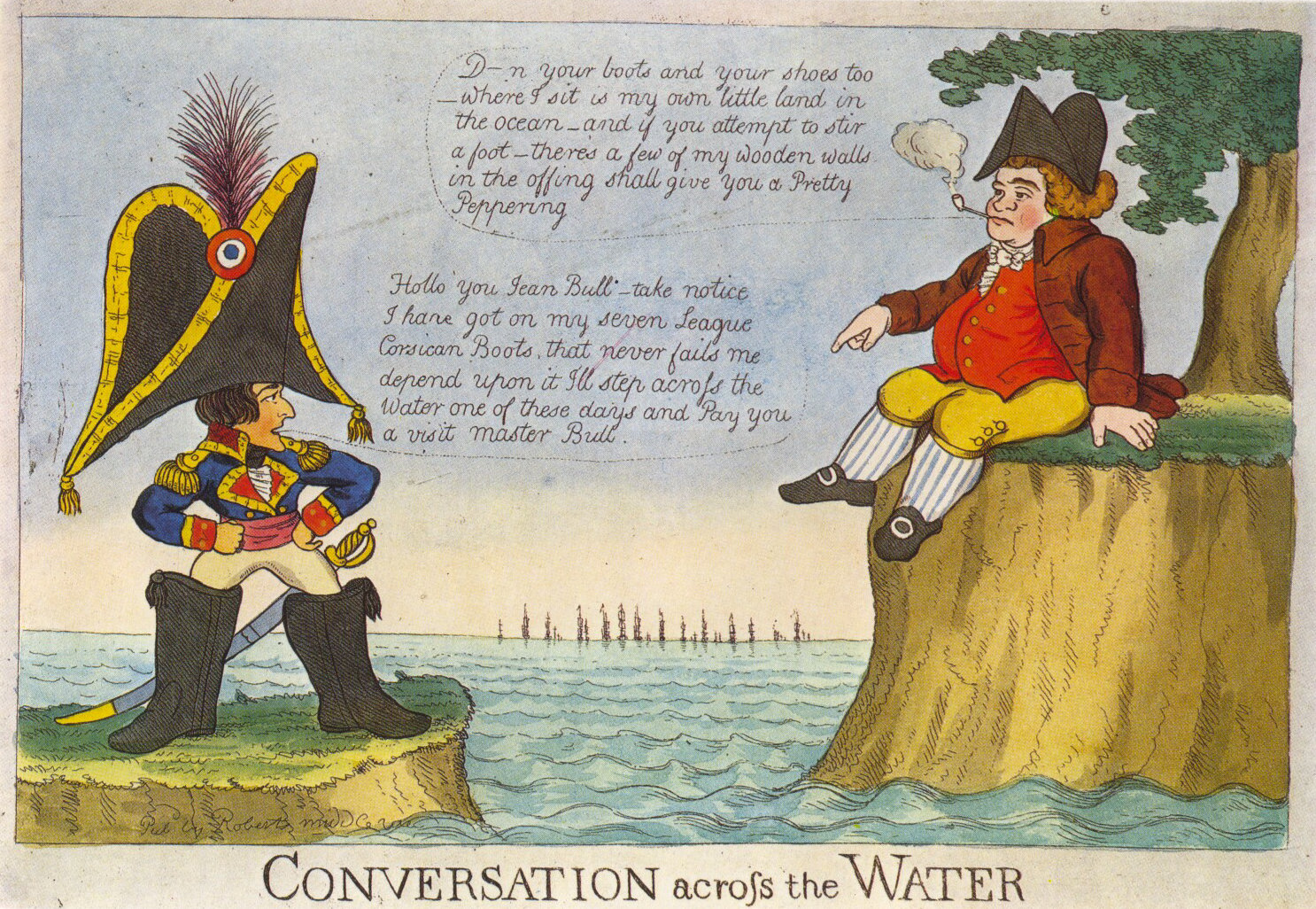
John Bull protected by the Royal Navy

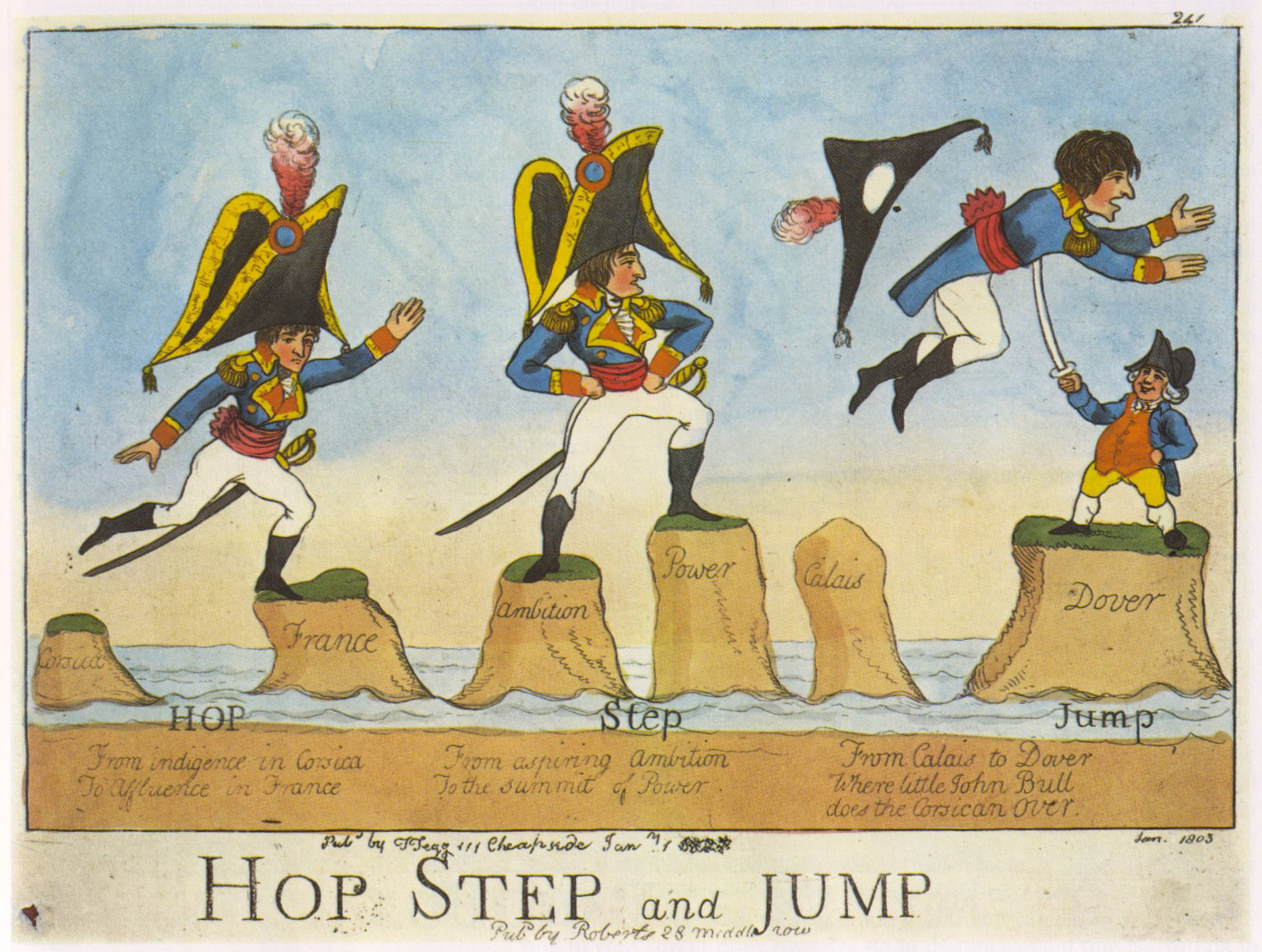
John Bull vanquishing Napoleon

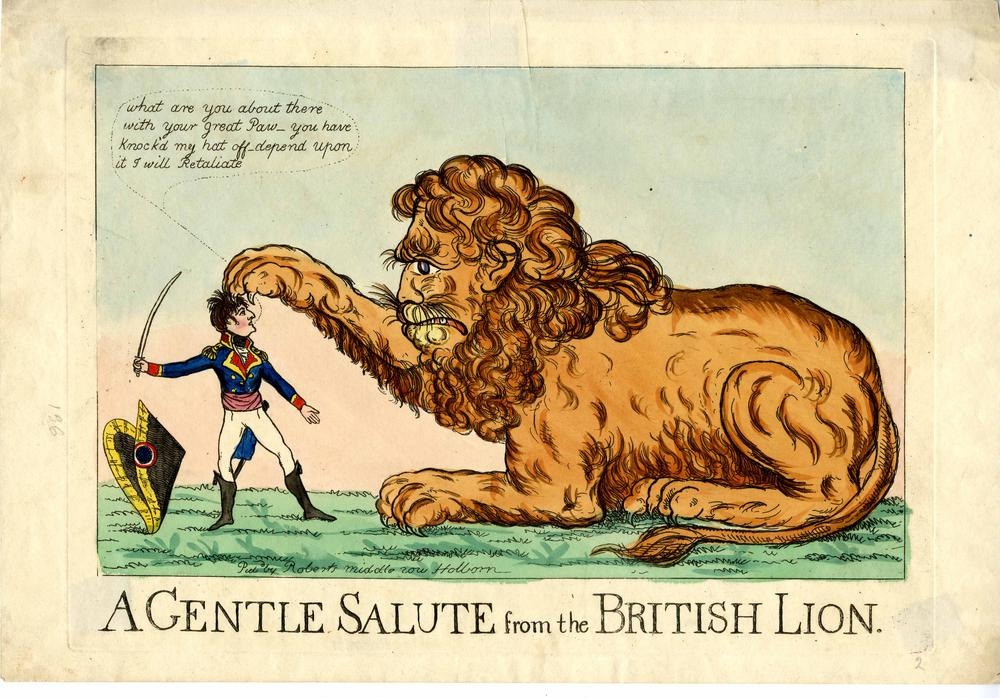
Caricature of a "Gentle Salute" from the British Lion, knocking Napoleon's hat off (circa 1803)

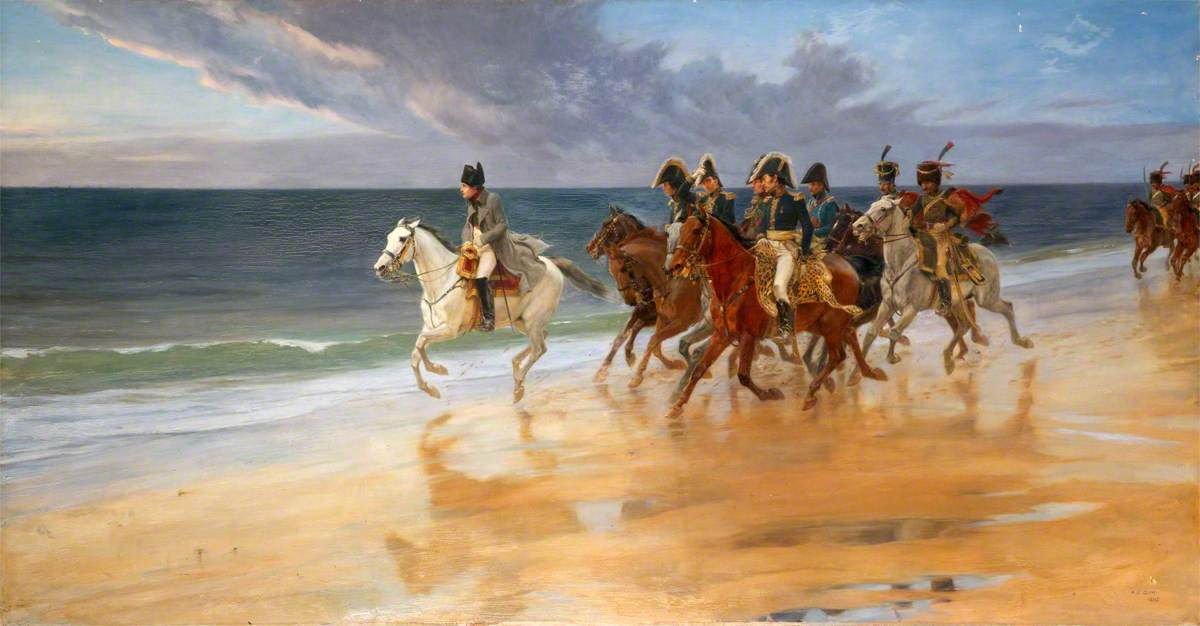
Napoleon on the Sands at Boulogne by Andrew Carrick Gow, 1895

== See also ==
- Charles François Dumouriez#Later life and death
- French intervention during the Irish Rebellion of 1798
- Operation Sea Lion, planned invasion of the United Kingdom during World War II
