= Pieter Hendrik van Zuylen van Nijevelt =

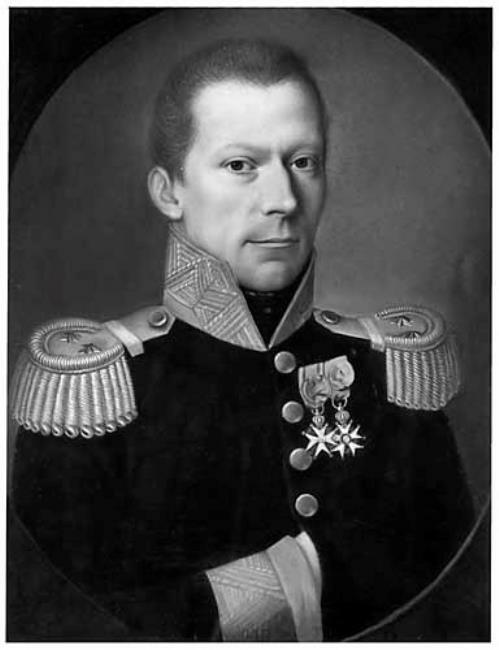
Pieter Hendrik van Zuylen van Nijevelt

Pieter Hendrik van Zuylen van Nijevelt (1 July 1782 in Kampen – 25 January 1825 in Utrecht) was a Dutch count and baron who served as a general in the French and Dutch armies during the Napoleonic era and later. He was present at the Battle of Waterloo in 1815 as chief of staff of the 2nd Dutch Division.

Pieter Hendrik's son Julius van Zuylen van Nijevelt (1819–1894), born in Luxembourg, inherited his titles of count and baron. He served as prime minister of the Netherlands from 1866 to 1868.

== Early years ==
Pieter Hendrik van Zuylen van Nijevelt was a member of the prominent Rotterdam patrician (regenten) family of Van Zuylen van Nijevelt. He was the oldest son of Philip Julius van Zuylen van Nijevelt and Clara Helena de Wacker van Son. His father was a Dutch general who was appointed Marshal of Holland in the Kingdom of Holland, served as French senator following the annexation of Holland by the Napoleonic Empire, and was named comte de l'Empire by Napoleon.

== Napoleonic era ==
During the Napoleonic era, he served in the Dutch brigade on the French side in the Peninsular War from 1808 to 1810; at the Battle of Ocaña (1809), he was a captain. Van Zuylen van Nijevelt also served in the French armed forces in Germany and Russia. At the age of 30, he was promoted to the rank of adjutant general.

Following the restoration of the House of Orange-Nassau in the Netherlands in 1813, he joined the Dutch armed forces with the rank of colonel (as the rank of adjutant general did not exist in the Dutch army). In the Battle of Quatre Bras and the Battle of Waterloo (1815), Pieter Hendrik served on the allied side as chief of staff of the 2nd Dutch Division under the command of Perponcher. In recognition of his service at Waterloo, he received the Military William Order and was promoted to the rank of general.

== United Kingdom of the Netherlands ==
In 1817 he married his niece, the baroness Susanna Martha van Zuylen van Nijevelt (1787–1831). They moved to Luxembourg where he served as Dutch military commander. In Luxembourg, Pieter Hendrik frequently came into conflict with the Prussian military, who garrisoned the fortress of Luxembourg.

He left Luxembourg in 1824 for Utrecht, where he lived in a house on Plompetorengracht canal. There he died in 1825 at age 42, a year before the death of his father.
