= Van Zuylen van Nijevelt =

- noble family
- Coat of arms
- Country: Netherlands
- Founded: 17th century
- Current head: Hugo Robert Johan van Zuylen van Nijevelt
- Titles: Count van Zuylen van Nijevelt

Van Zuylen van Nijevelt (Dutch pronunciation: [vɑn ˈzœylə(ɱ) vɑ ˈnɛi(ə)vɛlt]) is a noble family from the region of Rotterdam, town and region where several members of the family played a significant role. The head of the family is the Count van Zuylen van Nijevelt; the rest of the family bears the title baron or baroness.

== Origins ==
During the 19th century members of this family tried to prove that they were descendants of the Utrecht noble family. This has later been found impossible to prove.

Their genealogy starts with a merchant in hosiery trade Van Zuylen. Later they added 'Van Nijevelt' at the time when they had become affluent and accomplished important duties in Rotterdam. In 1848 they added "Van De Weyer", because of a familial marriage.

Philip Julius van Zuylen van Nijevelt, senator, was made comte de l'Empire dd. 17 maart 1811. Several of his brothers were made baron de l'Empire in 1813 (not formally confirmed).

Under the United Kingdom of the Netherlands, several royal decrees, between 1815–1822, confirmed the noble status of the family. In 1822 the chief of the family was made a count and all other members baron and baroness.

== Personalities ==
This list contains members of both the Rotterdam and Utrecht houses.

- mr. Jacob van Zuylen van Nijevelt (1699-1753), married in 1732 Aletta Johanna Timmers (1707-1775)
- mr. Jacob van Zuylen van Nijevelt (1739-1805), administrator of Rotterdam 1766-1805
- Jan Adriaan van Zuylen van Nijevelt (1776-1840), province governor.
- Arnout van Zuylen van Nijevelt (1780-1835), member of the reunion of notable citizens
- Jacob Pieter Pompejus van Zuylen van Nijevelt (1816-1890), prime minister
- Hugo van Zuylen van Nijevelt (1781-1853), minister.
- Philip Julius van Zuylen van Nijevelt (1743-1826), gouvernor of Amsterdam.
- Pieter Hendrik van Zuylen van Nijevelt (1782-1825), commander of Limburg
- Julius van Zuylen van Nijevelt (1819-1894), prime minister
- Robert van Zuylen van Nijevelt (1859-1911), mayor of Wassenaar.
- Philip Jules graaf van Zuylen van Nijevelt (1898-1940)
- Count Hugo Robert Johan van Zuylen van Nijevelt (1929-2018), founder of Duinrell
- Philip van Zuylen van Nijevelt (1962), CEO Duinrell
- Roderick van Zuylen van Nijevelt (1964), CEO Duinrell.

== Arms ==
The family has canting arms: zuil is the Dutch word for column. Hence, the coat of arm depicts three columns. It seems to have been copied from the arms of the van Zuylen van Nievelt family from Utrecht.

== Literature ==
- H. Obreen-La maison de Zuylen dans l'histoire des Pays-Bas, (Tongerloo, 1933).
- D.G. van Epen-Het geslacht van Zuylen van Nijevelt, ('s-Gravenhage, 1904).
