= Philip Julius van Zuylen van Nijevelt =

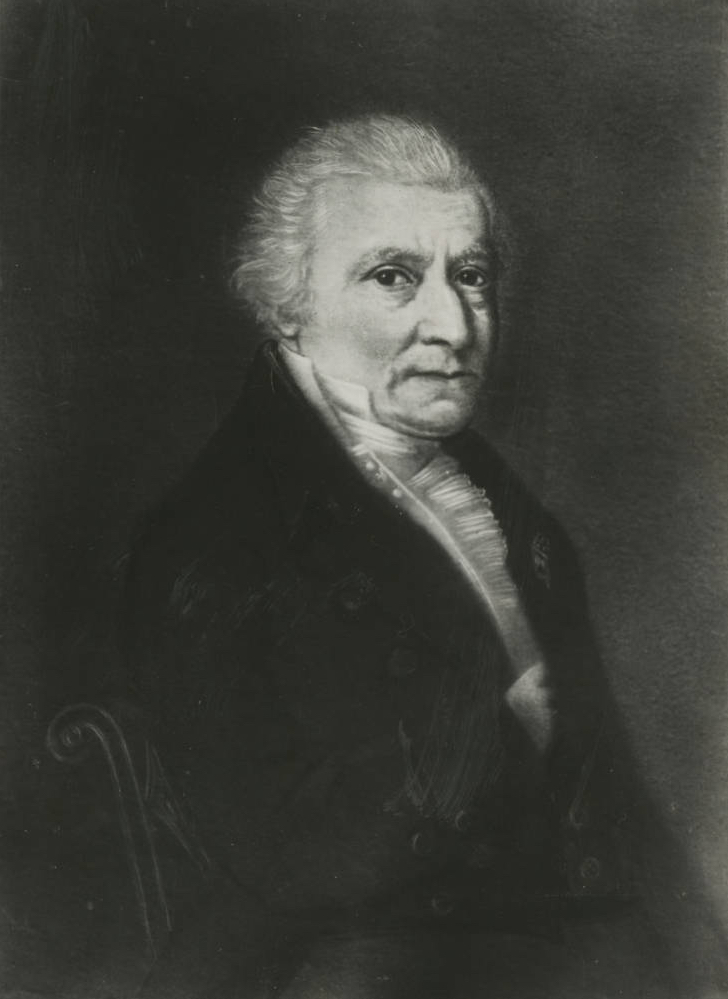
- Born: 5 January 1743; Rotterdam
- Died: 20 February 1826 (aged 83); Utrecht
- Military career
- Allegiance: Dutch Republic; Batavian Republic; Kingdom of Holland; First French Empire; United Kingdom of the Netherlands
- Rank: Lieutenant General
- Awards: Marshal of Holland

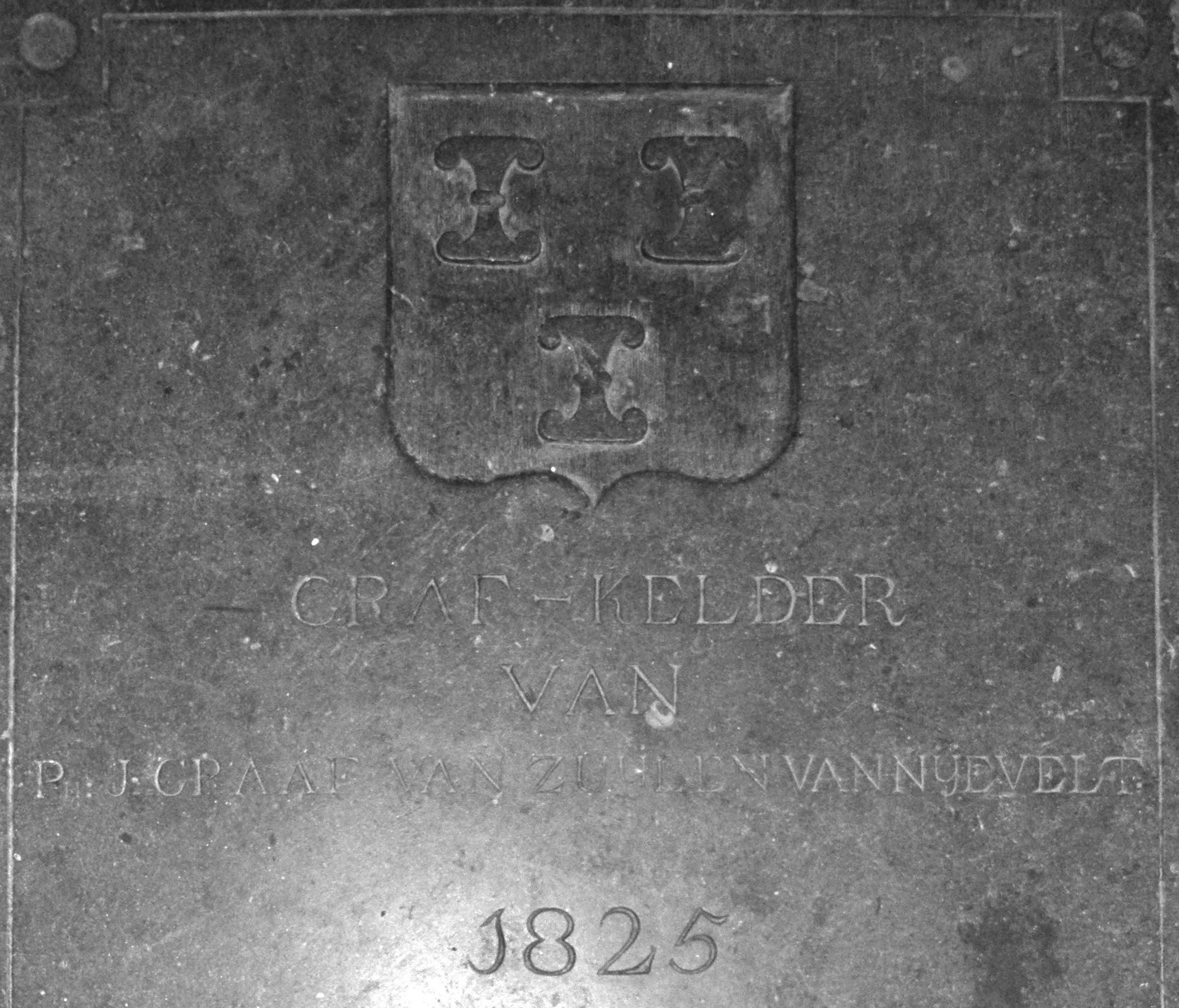
Grave stone of Philip Julius van Zuylen van Nyevelt (Jacobikerk, Utrecht)

Philip (or Philippus) Julius van Zuylen van Nijevelt (Rotterdam, 5 January 1743 – Utrecht, 20 February 1826) was a Dutch general, nobleman and politician. He was appointed Marshal of Holland in the Kingdom of Holland and served as French senator following the annexation of Holland by the Napoleonic Empire. Van Zuylen van Nijevelt was also an amateur scientist and became known for his treatise on chess.

== Life and career ==
=== Old Dutch Republic ===
Philip Julius van Zuylen van Nijevelt was a member of the prominent Rotterdam patrician (regenten) family of Van Zuylen van Nijevelt. His parents were Jacob van Zuylen van Nijevelt (1699–1753) and Aletta Johanna Timmers.

He studied mathematics and in 1767 joined the army as a volunteer ensign in the Regiment Karabiniers Oranje-Friesland (Orange-Frisia Regiment of Carabiniers). He rose quickly in the ranks, to captain of the cavalry (1768), major (1779), and finally lieutenant-colonel in the regiment of dragoons.

In 1795, he gained promotion to major general and was given responsibility for the organisation of the Dutch cavalry.

=== Batavian Republic ===
In 1796, a year after the Batavian Revolution, he was given command of the 2nd Brigade of the Batavian army, based in Arnhem. During the Anglo-Russian invasion of Holland in 1799, this brigade was part of the Batavian 1st Division under the command of Herman Willem Daendels. On 21 August 1799, he was injured in battle.

In 1804 Van Zuylen van Nijevelt was promoted to the rank of lieutenant general.

=== Kingdom of Holland ===
In the Kingdom of Holland, he was military governor in The Hague and military commander of the provinces of Holland and Utrecht. He served as Grand Chamberlain and Grand Master of Ceremonies at the court of King Louis Bonaparte, and also served as president of the Hoge Raad van Adel (High Council of Nobility) and as governor of the military schools.

On 1 March 1808 — well before the French annexation of Holland — Van Zuylen van Nijevelt was made a French comte de l'Empire. That same year, he moved into a mansion on the canals of Amsterdam, De Vergulde Turkse Keyser at Herengracht 527, which King Louis Bonaparte had purchased for him at a price of 100,000 guilders. Emperor Napoleon may have stayed at the house when he visited Amsterdam in 1811.

Van Zuylen van Nijevelt was one of three Dutch generals who were named Marshal of Holland (Maarschalk van Holland). On 21 December 1806, King Louis Bonaparte promoted both Van Zuylen van Nijevelt and Jean-Baptiste Dumonceau to marshal; Daendels received the title a few months later. Napoleon was infuriated by these appointments and they were annulled on 4 February 1810.

=== First French Empire ===
Following the French annexation of Holland in 1810, Napoleon appointed Van Zuylen van Nijevelt to the French Senate.

He was appointed an officer of the Légion d'honneur and also received the Grand Cross of the Order of the Union in the Kingdom of Holland and the Order of the Golden Eagle in Württemberg.

When Napoleon abdicated in 1814, Van Zuylen van Nijevelt voted in favour of the new French constitution that declared Louis XVIII as the new king of France.

=== United Kingdom of the Netherlands ===
Van Zuylen van Nijevelt kept the rank of lieutenant general in the United Kingdom of the Netherlands. By royal decree, he was recognized as a member of the nobility of the Netherlands on 17 October 1822, with the hereditary titles of baron and count. The title of baron(ess) would be passed onto all legal heirs, while the title of count would pass only to the firstborn son.

== Chess and astronomy ==
Van Zuylen van Nijevelt wrote a well-known treatise on the game of chess, La Supériorité aux Échecs (1792). The book's full title was La Supériorité aux Échecs mise à la portée de tout le monde, et particulierement des dames qui aiment cet amusement. It was reprinted several times and translated into several languages.

He was the first Dutchman to write a book on chess, and probably also the first person to come up with the idea of random chess (also known as shuffle chess), a chess variant whereby the starting position of the main pieces is chosen at random. He wrote that he hated openings "with all those annoying, constantly repeating patterns" and therefore thought of randomizing the starting positions of the chess pieces. "This produces a huge number of different situations, so that no one can study them beforehand," according to Van Zuylen van Nijevelt.

In Zwolle, a chess society was founded in his honour.

In his final years, Zuylen van Nijevelt also wrote a treatise on astronomy, L'Attraction détruite par le mouvement primordial. ou Théorie nouvelle du cours des corps célestes et du mouvement, orné de planches (Brussels, 1819).

== Family ==
On 29 June 1779, Van Zuylen van Nijevelt married Clara Helena de Wacker van Son. They had seven children:

- Adelaide Jeanne van Zuylen van Nijevelt (1780-)
- Pieter Hendrik van Zuylen van Nijevelt (1782–1825)
- Julie van Zuylen van Nijevelt (1783–1864)
- Jeanne Marie Catherine van Zuylen van Nijevelt (1786–1848)
- Susanne Henriette van Zuylen van Nijevelt (1787–1831)
- Arnoud Jacob van Zuylen van Nijevelt (1788–1821)
- Henriette Catherine Martha van Zuylen van Nijevelt (1792–1878)

His firstborn son Pieter Hendrik fought in the Battle of Ocaña (1809) as a captain on the French side. In the Battle of Waterloo (1815), Pieter Hendrik served on the allied side as a colonel and chief of staff of the 2nd Dutch Division. Later he became, like his father, major general of the Dutch cavalry. Pieter Hendrik's son Julius van Zuylen van Nijevelt (1819–1894) served as prime minister of the Netherlands from 1866 to 1868.

Lodewijk Napoleon van Randwijck (1807–1891), son of Adelaide Jeanne van Zuylen van Nijevelt, served as minister of interior affairs (1846–1848) and as minister of foreign affairs (1848).

Dutch nobility
New title	Count van Zuylen van Nijevelt; 1822–1826	Succeeded by Julius van Zuylen van Nijevelt
