= Carel Hendrik Ver Huell =

Dutch naval officer and politician

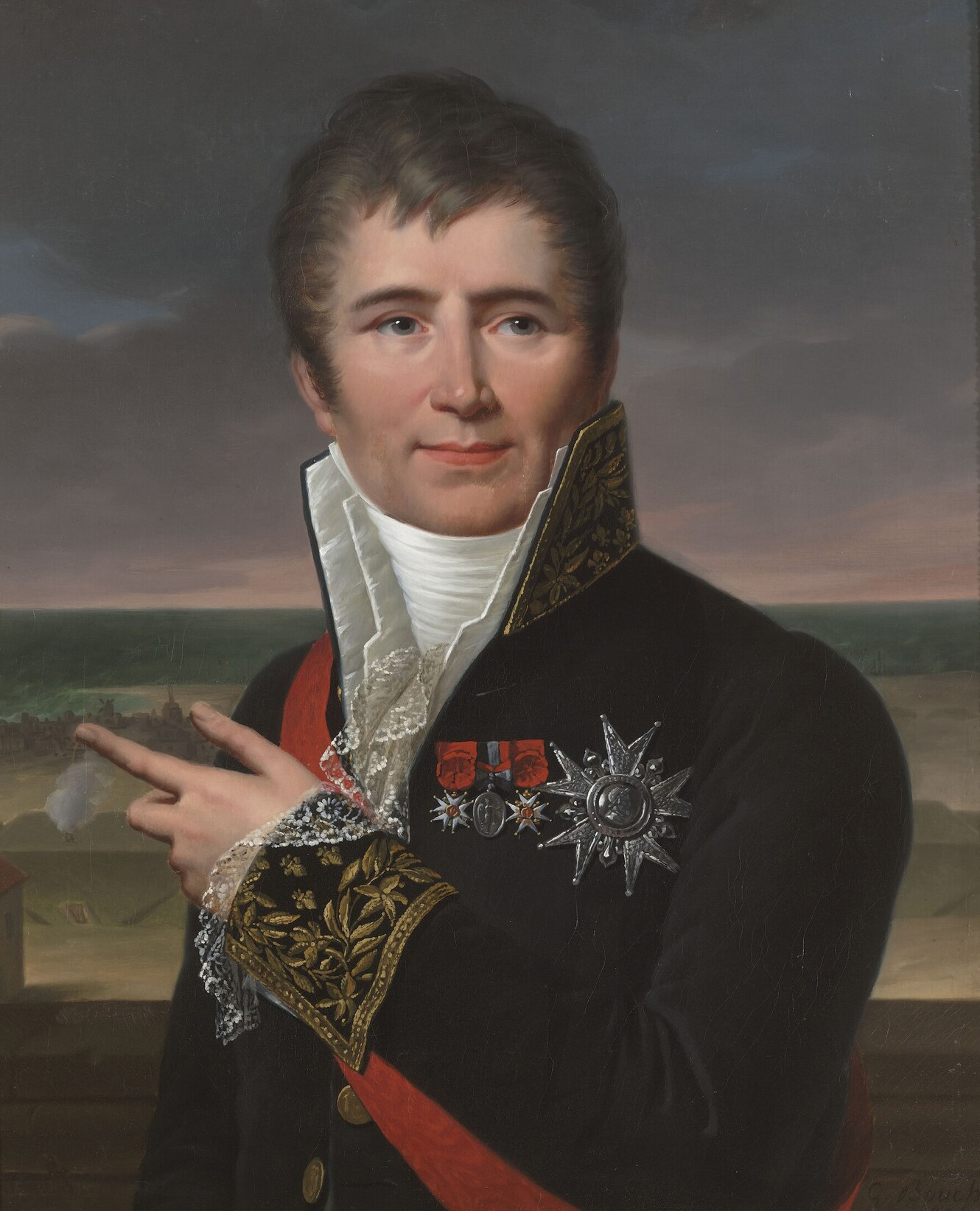
- Portrait by Louis-André-Gabriel Bouchet, 1824
- Born: 11 February 1764; Doetinchem, Dutch Republic
- Died: 25 October 1845 (aged 81); Paris, France
- Military career
- Allegiance: Dutch Republic; Batavian Republic; Kingdom of Holland; First French Empire; Kingdom of France
- Branch: Dutch States Navy; Batavian Navy; Navy of the Kingdom of Holland; French Imperial Navy; French Navy
- Service years: 1775–1816
- Rank: Vice admiral
- Commands: Argo; Heemskerk; Koninklijken Hollander
- Conflicts: Affair of Fielding and Bylandt; Fourth Anglo-Dutch War; Battle of Dogger Bank (1781); War of the First Coalition; War of the Second Coalition; War of the Third Coalition; Napoleon's planned invasion of the United Kingdom; Battle of Ostend (1804); Battle of Blanc-Nez and Gris-Nez; War of the Fourth Coalition; War of the Fifth Coalition; Walcheren Campaign; War of the Sixth Coalition; Siege of Den Helder; Hundred Days

Vice-Admiral Carel Hendrik, comte Ver Huell (4 February 1764 – 25 October 1845) was a Dutch naval officer and politician. He married Maria Johanna de Bruyn on 22 February 1789 at Hummelo, and had three sons with her.

== Career ==
Ver Huell had a checkered career in which he switched allegiances a number of times. However, he was not alone in this, Talleyrand and Fouché doing similar. He worked hard for his current master, and often was able to restore a good relationship with former masters.

=== Dutch Republic ===
Ver Huell joined the Dutch States Army officer cadet in an infantry regiment but soon switched to the Dutch States Navy, becoming a midshipman in 1779. On board the 40-gun frigate Argo he participated in the affair of Fielding and Bylandt on 30 December 1779, during which a Dutch convoy,escorted by a squadron under Admiral Lodewijk van Bylandt was intercepted by a Royal Navy squadron under Commodore Charles Fielding.

In 1781, he took part as a third lieutenant, still aboard Argo, in the Battle of Dogger Bank (1781), where he distinguished himself. For his conduct he was made a Knight (third class) in the Military Order of William, by William II of the Netherlands in 1843, 62 years after the battle. He was wounded during the battle, and was promoted to second lieutenant in recompense.

He served in the Mediterranean on board several vessels during the next few years of the Fourth Anglo-Dutch War. In 1785 he helped suppress a mutiny aboard a naval vessel on the Zuiderzee. For this he was promoted to first lieutenant.

He served in the Baltic, Mediterranean, and North Sea till 1789. Promoted to commander in 1791 he commanded a corvette on a voyage to the East Indies. In 1792 he was made an adjutant to admiral Van Kinsbergen, the commander-in-chief of the Dutch Navy. He organized a corps of armed sailors on shore. The next year he was promoted to captain.

=== Batavian Republic ===
As an Orangist adherent of Stadtholder William V, he was fired, like most officers of the navy, after the 1795 revolution that resulted in the proclamation of the Batavian Republic. During the first years of that Republic he did not try to re-enlist, like many other officers, such as Theodorus Frederik van Capellen. However, he apparently was involved in the preparations for the Vlieter Incident of 1799, when as an agent for the exiled Stadtholder he tried to persuade Van Capellen to organize a mutiny.

After the 1801 coup of general Augereau, which brought the Staatsbewind to power in the Batavian Republic, and in general a more conservative regime, he was elected mayor of his birthplace Doetinchem (the same office his father had held) in 1802.

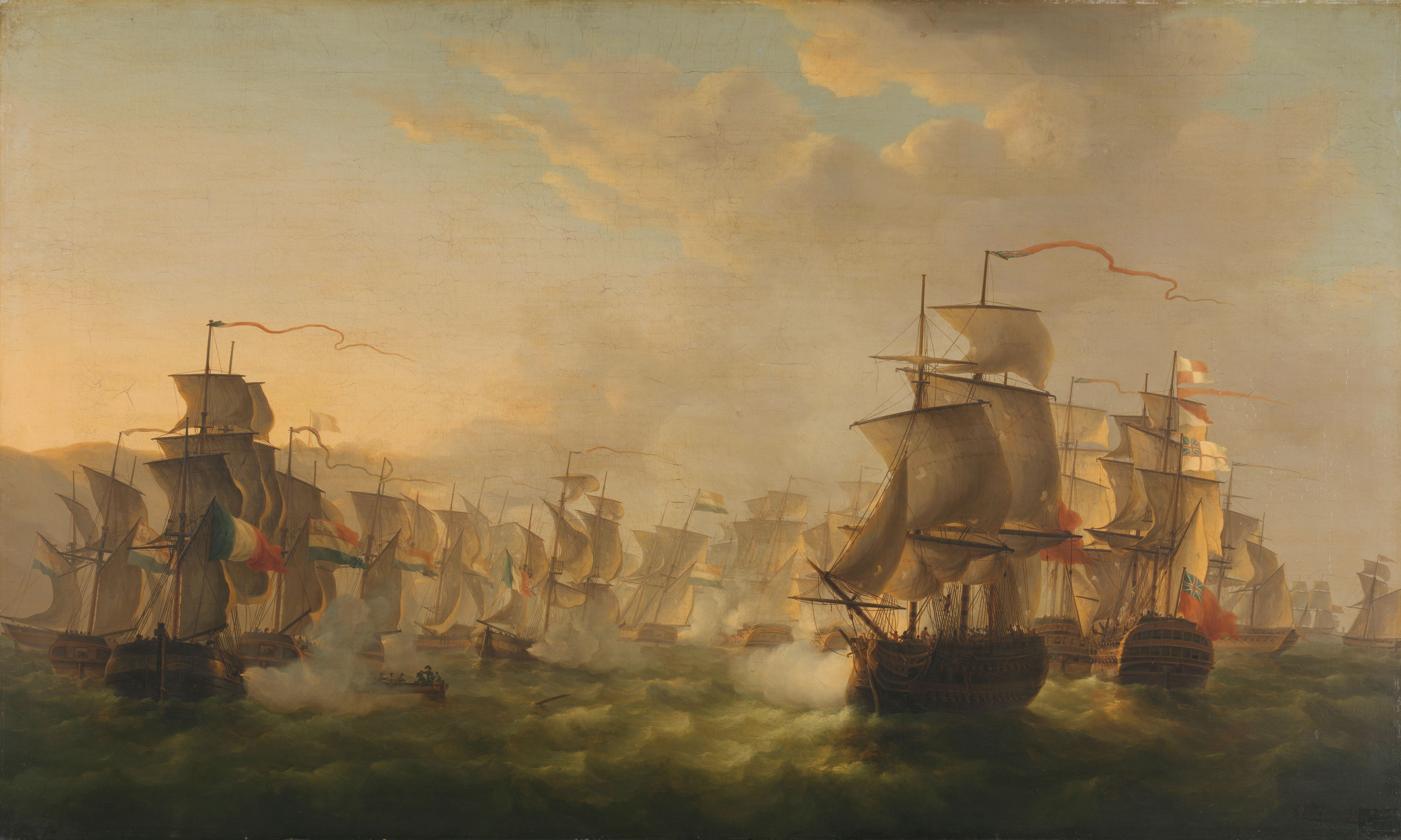
Battle of Blanc-Nez and Gris-Nez, 18 July 1805, by Martinus Schouman.

The next year war again broke out and the Batavian Navy was supposed to take part in the planned invasion of England. To this end a large flotilla of flat-bottomed boats was built in the Republic, that had to be transported over sea to Boulogne-sur-Mer, where the main invasion jump-off point was located. Ver Huell was selected to lead this dangerous mission as a vice-admiral. In 1804 he brought much of the flotilla from Vlissingen to Dunkirk. During this mission he was able to fend off an attack on this flotilla by admiral Sir William Sidney Smith near Ostend. This feat under the eyes of Napoleon himself earned him the membership of the Légion d'honneur. In 1805 he was again tasked with the transport of the flotilla and was able to get it to Boulogne, despite being attacked by a larger and stronger British squadron.

The Staatsbewind now appointed admiral Ver Huell minister for the navy, but he at first declined the appointment, because he was appointed commander of the right wing of the naval army that Napoleon had assembled at Boulogne. Only after the project of invasion had been called off did he take up his ministerial appointment. He remained in this position under the new regime of Rutger Jan Schimmelpenninck in 1805.

During his time in France he became a confidant of Napoleon, however, and he now entered in a secret correspondence with Talleyrand and Napoleon in which he undermined Schimmelpenninck's position. This placed him in an excellent position to help prepare the transition to the Kingdom of Holland, which Napoleon desired. He led the delegation of the Dutch government that on 6 June 1806 "petitioned" Napoleon's brother Louis Napoleon to become King of "Holland". For this service he was promoted to Grand Aigle de la Légion d'honneur.

=== Kingdom of Holland ===
The new king made him a marshal of Holland and continued him as Minister for the Navy. In 1807 he appointed him ambassador to France.

During the Walcheren Campaign of 1809 admiral Ver Huell temporarily took command of the royal navy of the kingdom, aboard Koninklijken Hollander, and adequately defended the coast of the country. For this Louis created him count of Zevenaar.

Meanwhile, however, Ver Huell remained in correspondence with Napoleon. He was a conscientious implementor of the policies of the emperor, even when those were not in the interest of his native country, like the Continental System, whereas Louis was more inclined to stand up to his brother, and defend the interests of his subjects. In this conflict of interests, Ver Huell steadfastly took the side of Napoleon and France. As in the last days of the Batavian Republic he was instrumental in bringing about the fall of the Kingdom.

=== French Empire ===
After the annexation of the Netherlands to the French Empire in July 1810, Ver Huell was made a vice-admiral in the imperial French navy. As such he was put in charge of French naval forces on the North German coast and in the Baltic, between Emden and Danzig. In 1811 Napoleon made him a count of the Empire (with a gratuity of 10,000 francs) and gave him a pension of 15,000 francs.

In 1812 he was made Grand Officier de l'Empire and given the naval command of Den Helder. This was still his position when the new "Sovereign Prince", William I of the Netherlands, took power in December 1813, after the military collapse of the Empire. Ver Huell held out against the besieging Dutch forces in the fortress of Den Helder till Napoleon's abdication in 1814. He then left for France as an exile.

=== Bourbon Restoration ===
In 1814 (as a post in William's new government was impossible because of his tenacious defense of Den Helder) Ver Huell acquired French nationality under the restored king Louis XVIII. Louis also maintained him in his naval rank and noble titles. He made him a chevalier dans l'ordre de Mérite militaire (Order of Military Merit). He also put him in charge of the naval defense of the French North Coast. During the Hundred Days, Ver Huell remained loyal to the Bourbon regime. However, when Napoleon wanted to escape to the United States after his second abdication in 1815, he asked that Ver Huell should be put in charge of the attempt, because of his reputation as a blockade runner. However, the Minister of the Navy, Denis Decrès, decided that such a small command would be beneath Ver Huell's dignity (without consulting Ver Huell, who later declared he would have been honored).

Ver Huell resigned from the French navy in 1816. He was made a pair de France on 5 March 1819. This made him a member of the Chambre des Pairs for life. In 1836 he briefly served as French ambassador in Berlin. He died on October 25, 1845.

== Miscellaneous facts ==
There is a rumor that probably lacks any ground, but which is hard to put to rest, that Ver Huell had a sexual relationship with Queen Hortense, the consort of King Louis of Holland. According to this rumor he fathered the future emperor Napoleon III.

The name of Ver Huell is inscribed in the Arc de Triomphe in Paris as one of the generals of Napoleon (first column, fourth from the top, between Dembarrere and Rouyer).

Ver Huell was buried at Père Lachaise Cemetery. The headstone is inscribed: Concession à perpétuité de la famille de Mr. l'Amiral comte Ver Huell Pair de France. His brother Christiaan Anthonie Ver Huell (also a Dutch vice-admiral), and two sons, are also buried in this cemetery.
