= Maurice Orange =

French artist (1867–1916)

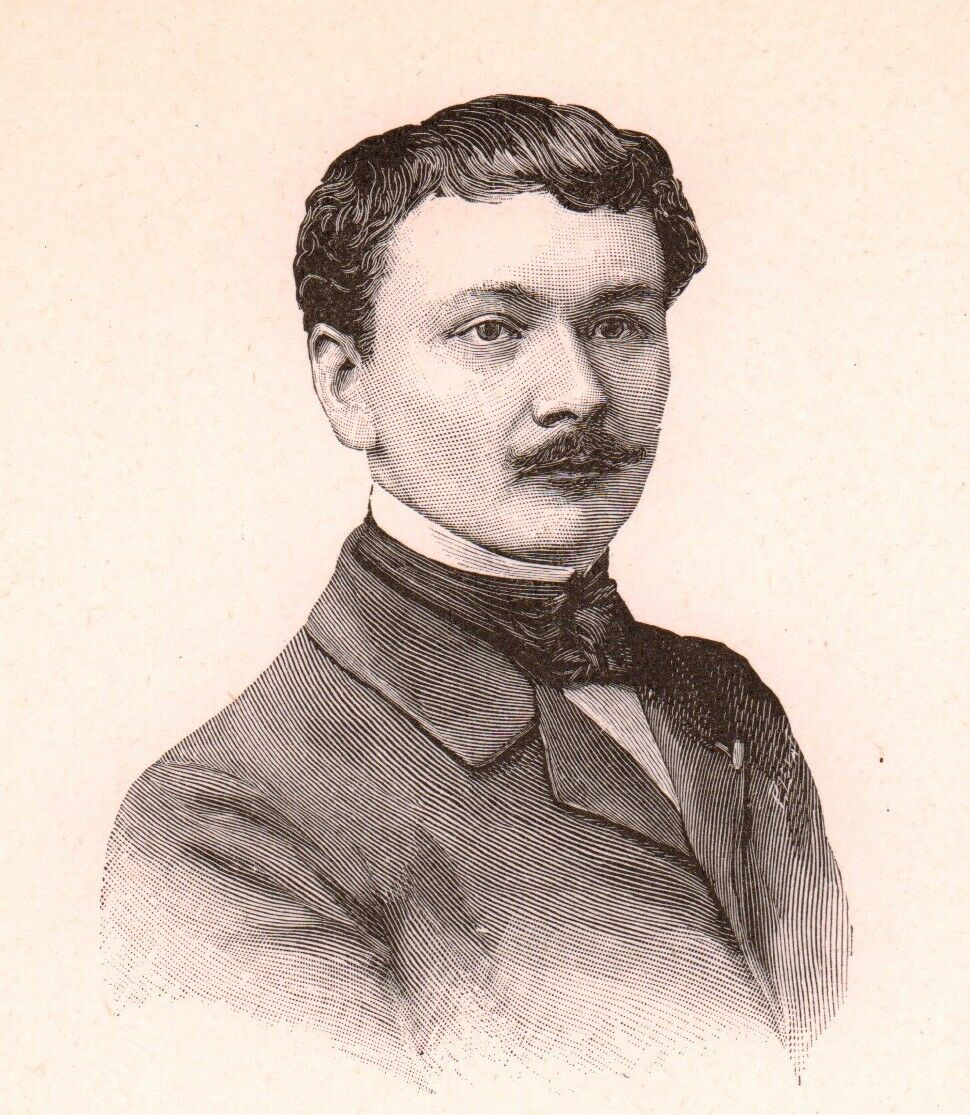
Portrait of Orange

Maurice Orange (9 March 1867 – 28 February 1916) was a French artist who specialised in military art.

== Life ==
Maurice Orange was born on 9 March 1867. His youth was spent with his family and was influenced by the Franco-Prussian War. Orange showed an early talent for drawing and his first tutors gained him a scholarship to the École des Beaux-Arts in 1885, where he studied under Jean-Léon Gérôme and François Flameng. He was mainly inspired by historical subjects, especially the Napoleonic era, though Orange also produced portraits, landscapes, townscapes and sketches, often adding drawings to his letters. From 1887 to 1914, he took part in the Salon des Artistes Français, and won many medals and travel bursaries. Spain, Greece, Italy, Portugal, Africa and Egypt became major influences on him. Orange worked in oils, watercolour, gouache, pastel, and charcoal. He died of typhoid fever on 28 February 1916.

== Gallery ==
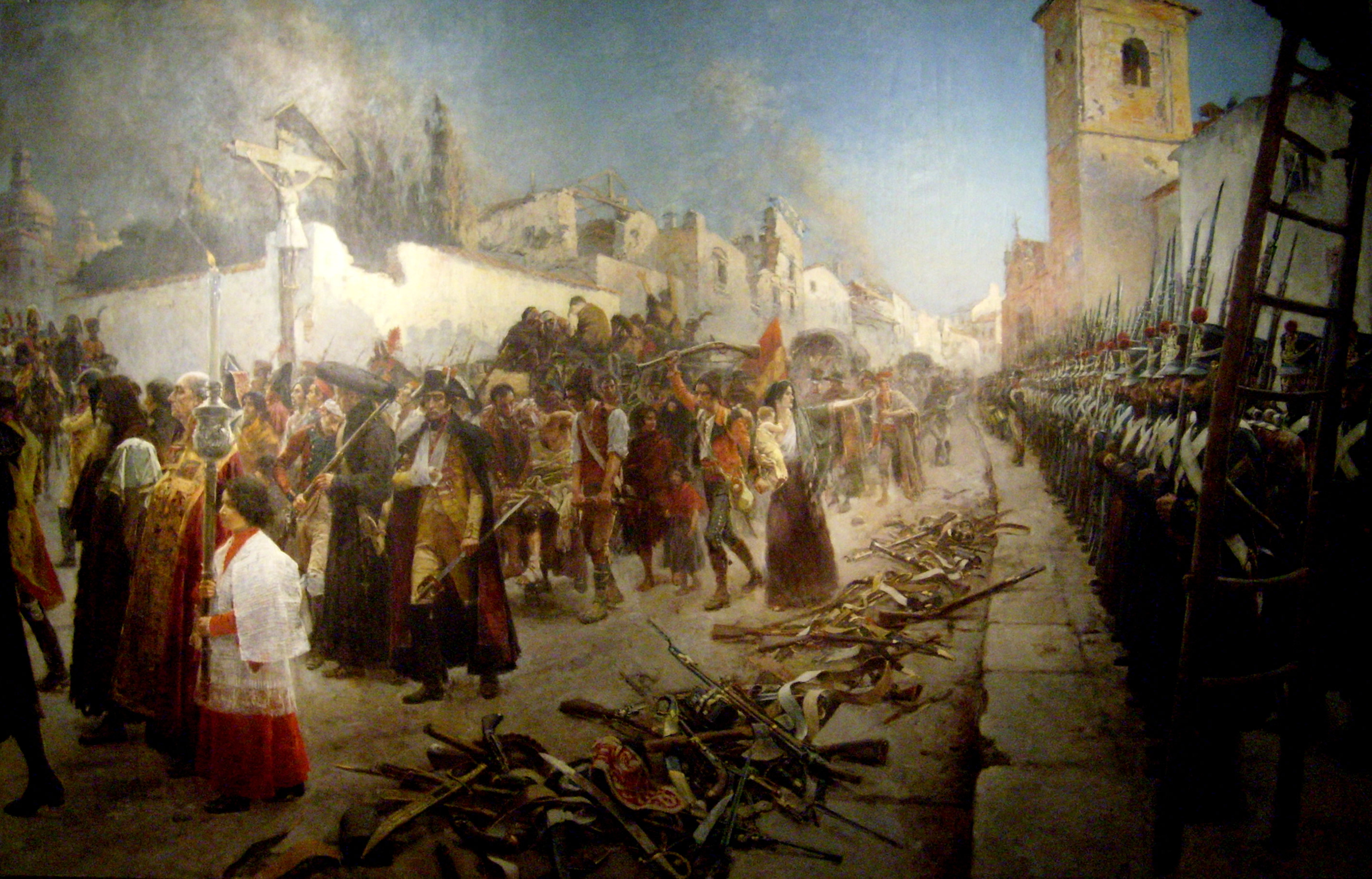
The defenders of Saragosse (1893)

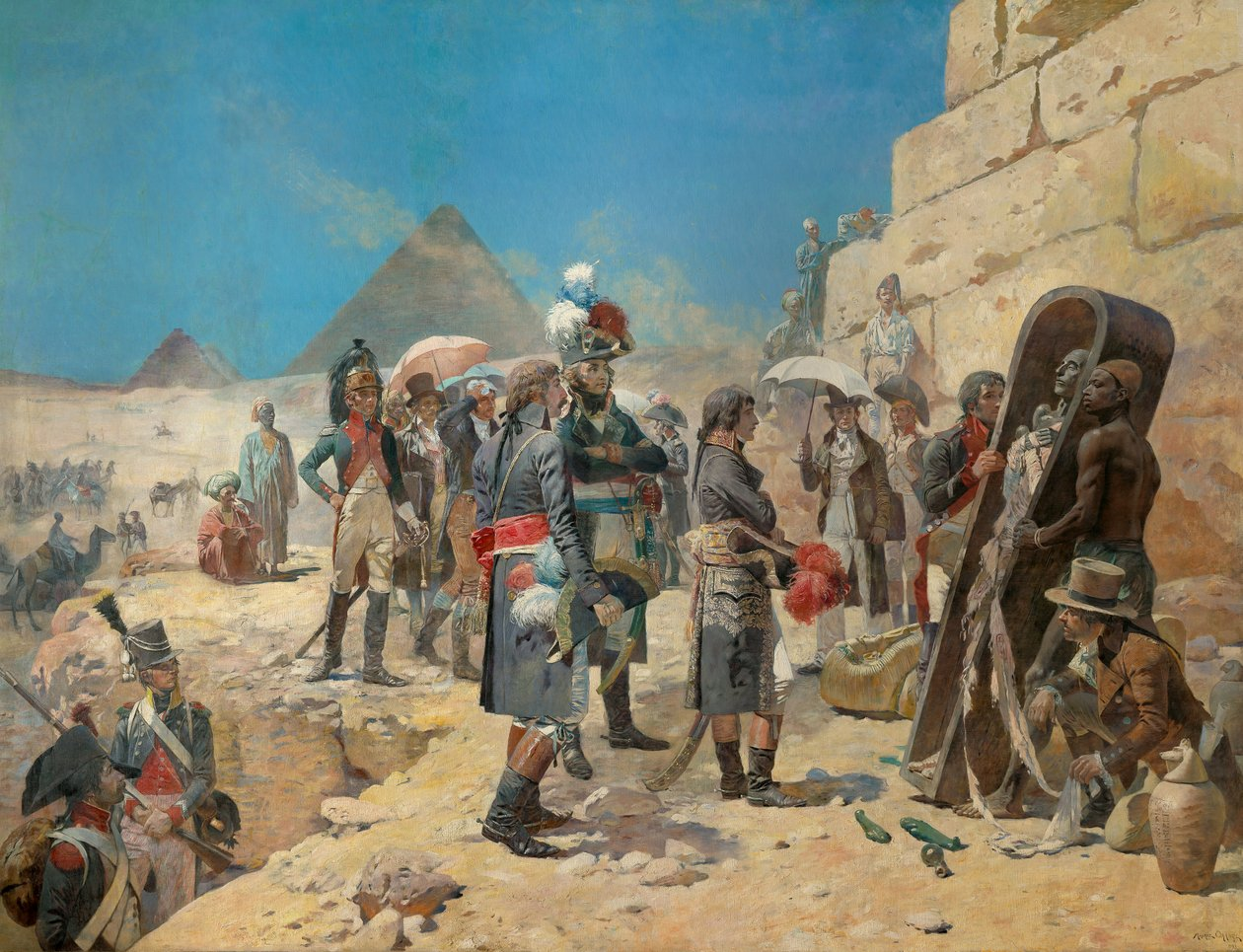
Napoleon Bonaparte in front of the pyramids contemplating the mummy of a king in the countryside of Egypt (1895)

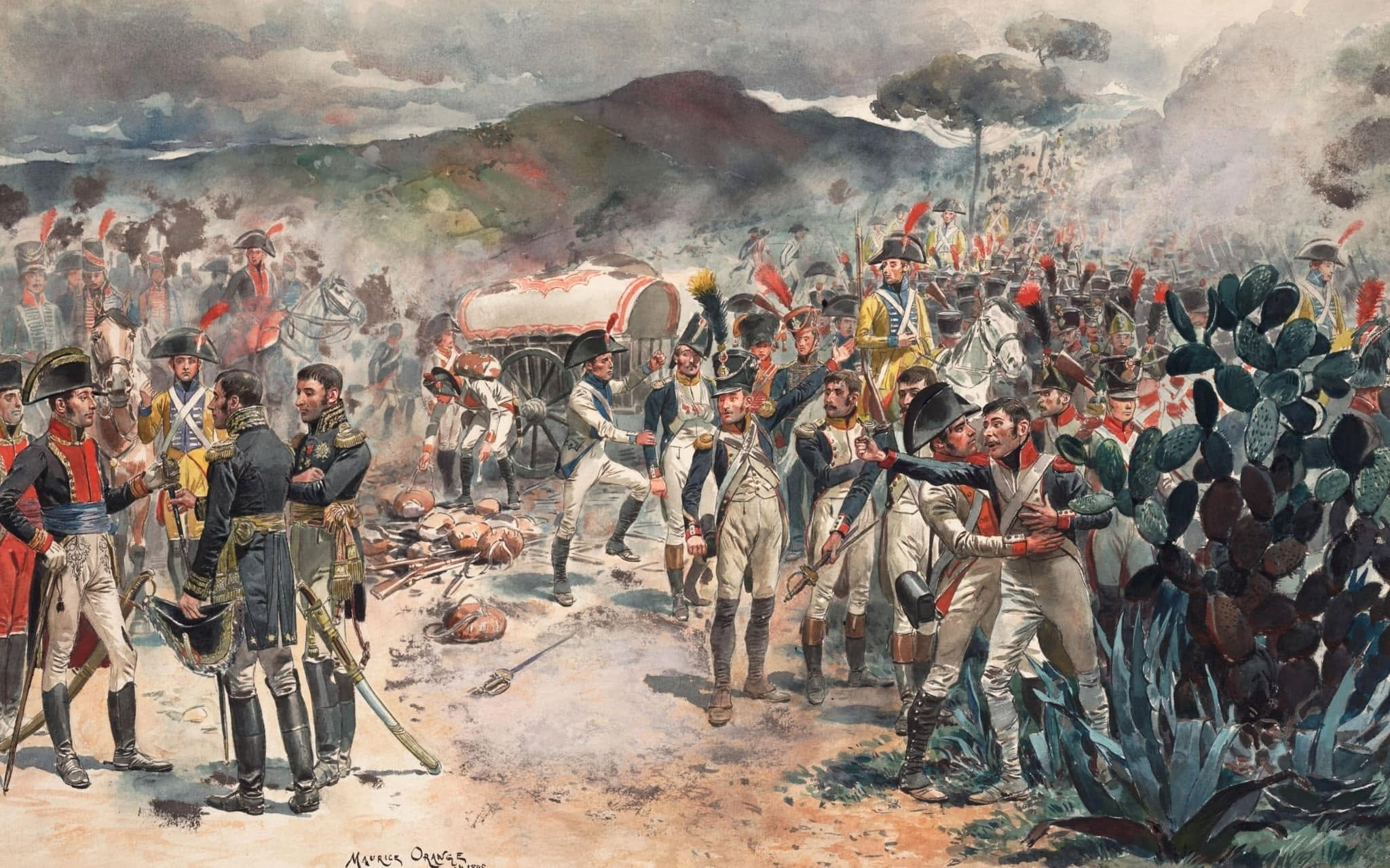
The surrender of Bailén (1906)

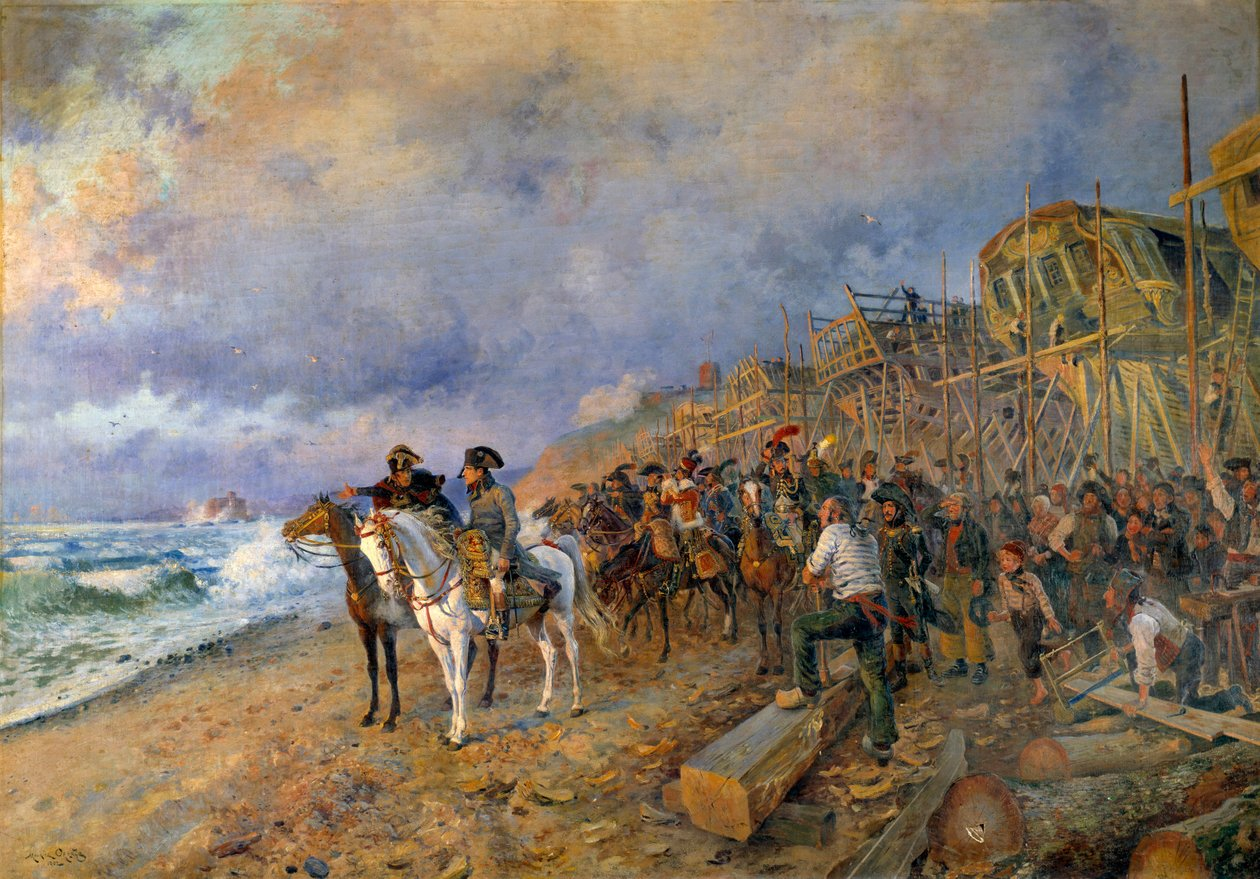
The First Consul Napoleon Bonaparte visits the arsenal of Boulogne

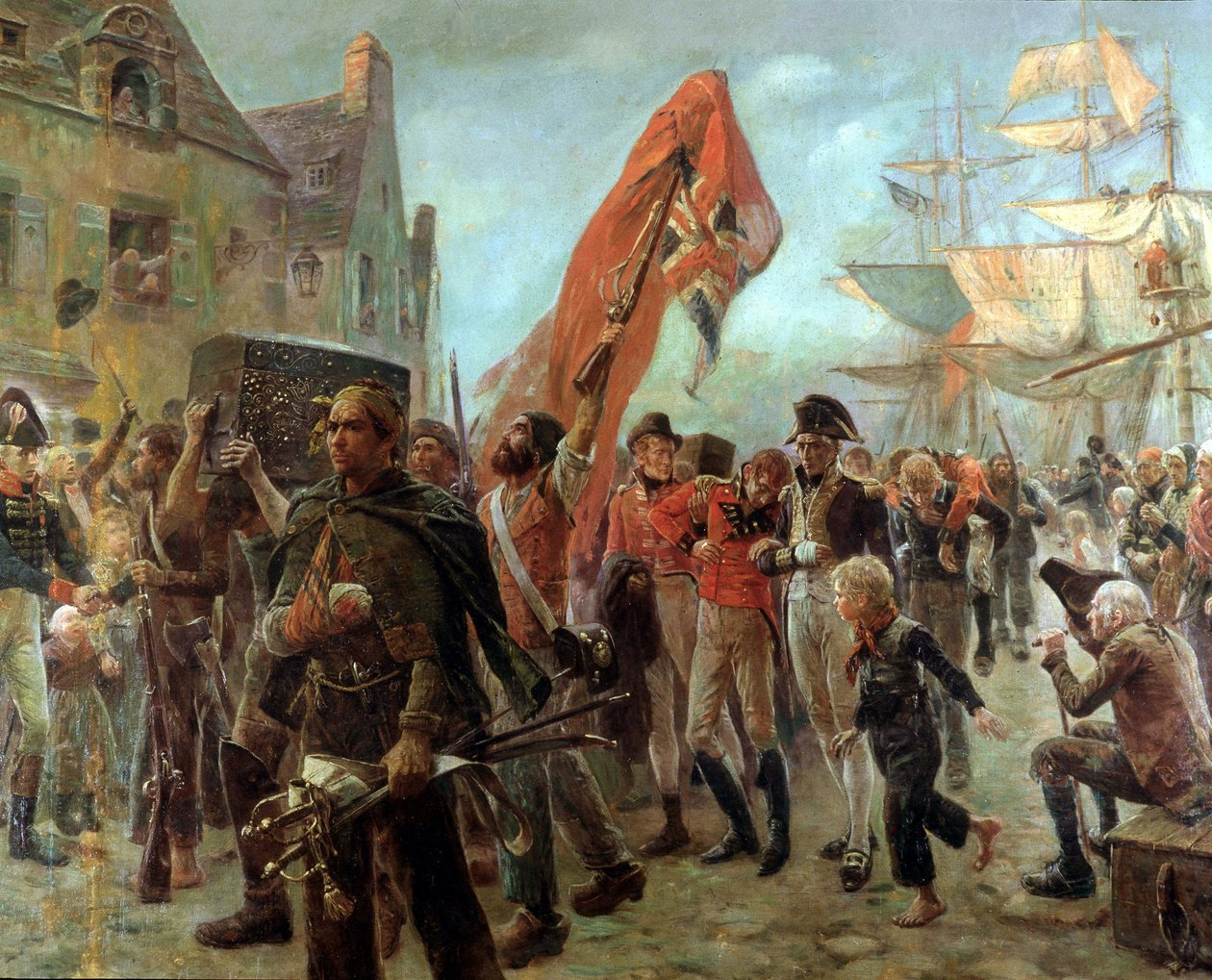
The return of the corsairs. 1806

== Bibliography ==
- Catalogue for the exhibitions at Granville by the Musée du Vieux Granville and the Musée d’art moderne Richard Anacréon (July–October 1999)
