= Battle of Blanc-Nez and Gris-Nez =

1805 battle of the Napoleonic Wars

Battle of Gris-Nez and Blanc-Nez
- Part of Napoleon's planned invasion of the United Kingdom
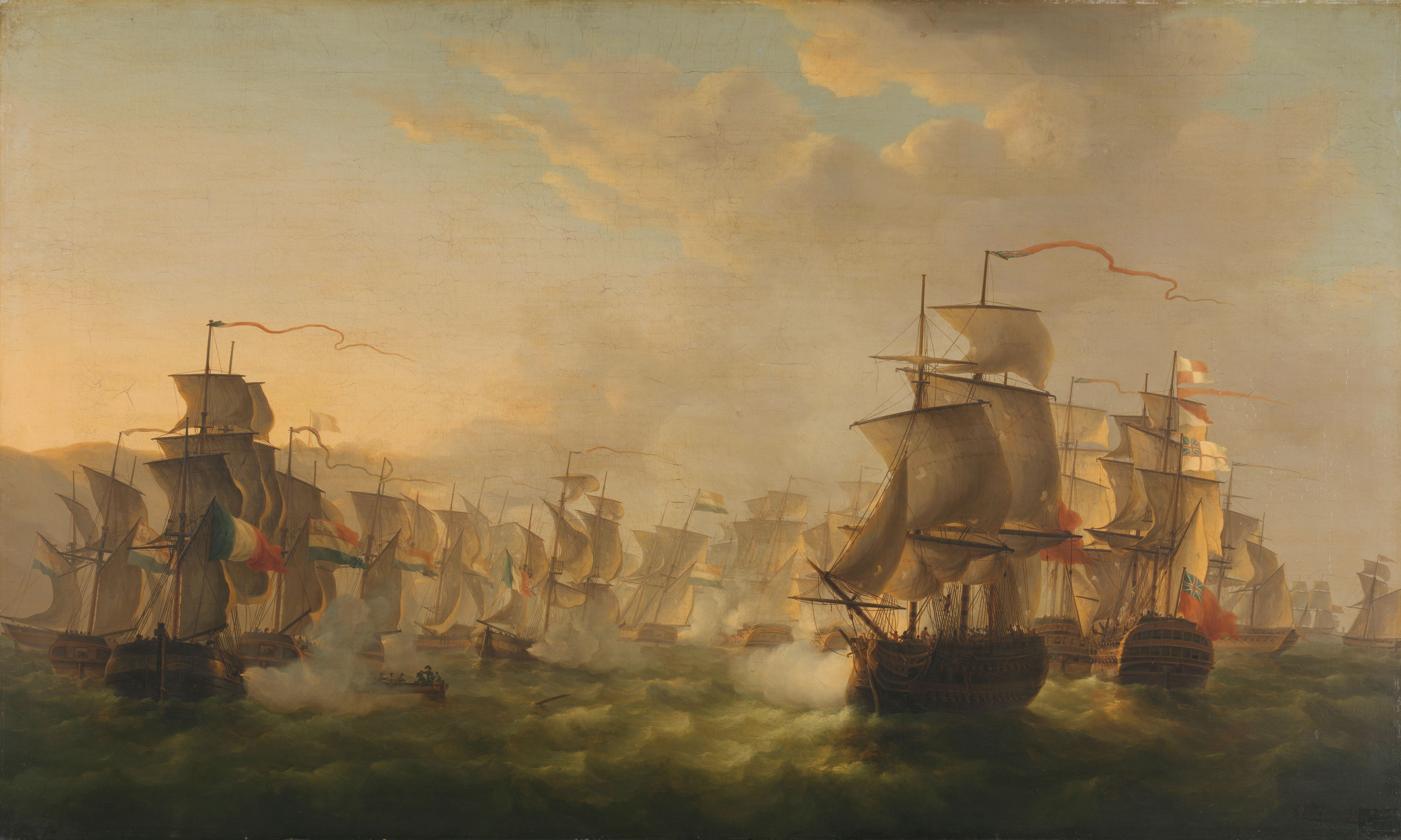
- The engagement between the Dutch and British fleets during the Dutch flotilla's voyage to Boulogne, 1805; Martinus Schouman, 1806
Date	18 July 1805
Location	Off Cap Blanc-Nez and Cap Gris-Nez, North Sea and English Channel
Result	Franco-Batavian victory

Belligerents
Batavian Commonwealth (First French Empire) France	(United Kingdom of Great Britain and Ireland) United Kingdom

Commanders and leaders
(Batavian Republic) Carel Hendrik Ver Huell	Lord Keith

Strength
21 gunboats 3 prams 180 guns in total Several French artillery batteries	45 warships At least 900 guns in total

Casualties and losses
10–16 killed 60–70 wounded	Unknown killed 260 wounded

The Battle of Blanc-Nez and Gris-Nez was fought on 18 July 1805 between a combined flotilla of the Batavian Navy and French Imperial Navy under Carel Hendrik Ver Huell and a Royal Navy fleet under Admiral of the Blue Lord Keith during the War of the Third Coalition. Ver Huell's flotilla was able to resist several attacks from the British and successfully reached Boulogne-sur-Mer.

== Background ==
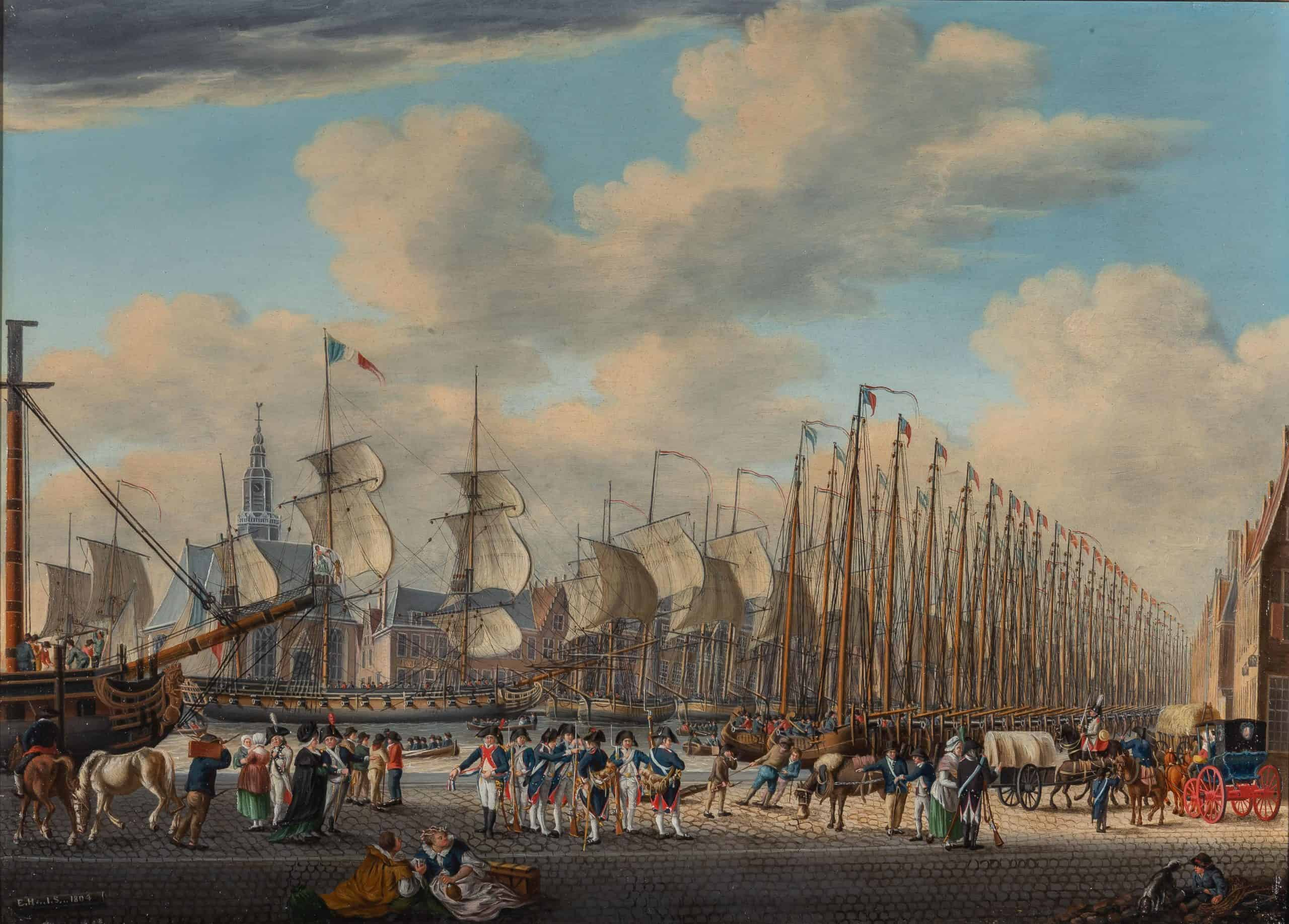
The Batavian fleet in Vlissingen, 1804

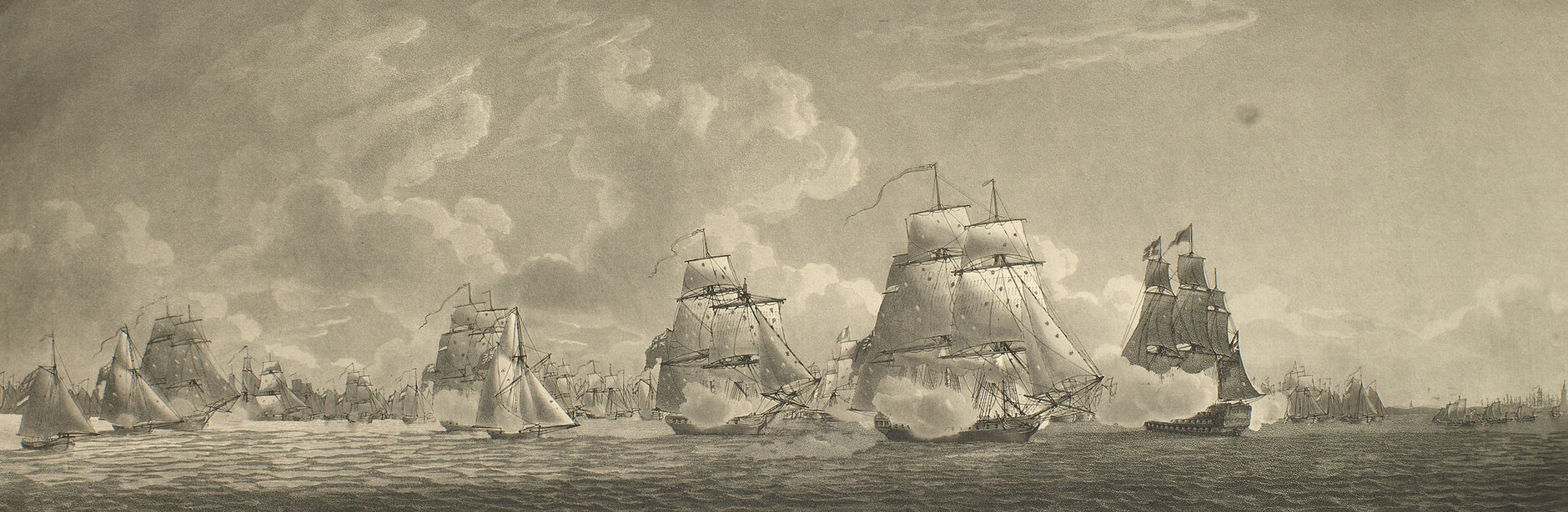
The engagement near Ostend, 1804

It intended for the Batavian Navy to take part in Napoleon's planned invasion of the United Kingdom. To this end, a large flotilla of flat-bottomed boats was built in the Batavian Republic, that had to be transported over sea to Boulogne, where the main invasion jump-off point was located. Carel Hendrik Ver Huell was selected to lead this dangerous mission as a vice-admiral. In 1804, Ver Huell already had successfully brought a large Batavian flotilla from Vlissingen to Dunkirk.

In 1804, a British Royal Navy fleet under the command Sir William Sidney Smith tried to prevent this near Ostend, but a combination of excellent Batavian seamanship and French artillery fire from the shore caused Smith to retreat. Napoleon was impressed and wrote to Ver Huell: "You reminded me, that you are of the blood of the Tromps (Note: can also refer to Cornelis Tromp) and De Ruyters." The feat earned Ver Huell the membership of the Légion d'honneur as the first non-Frenchman, and caused the Batavian government to make him vice-admiral and minister of the navy. He also was appointed commander of the right wing of the Flottille de Boulogne, which formed an important part of the larger fleet that was intended to invade Britain.

First, however, he received orders to sail his ships from Dunkirk to Ambleteuse, a port not far from Boulogne. Ver Huell set sail on 17 July 1805 with a flotilla of 4 French prams and 32 Batavian gunboats. A British Royal Navy fleet consisting of 15 warships, which was cruising nearby, attacked the flotilla. After a fierce engagement, the Franco-Batavian flotilla, again supported by French artillery on shore, repulsed the British attack and around 11:00 they were forced to retreat. The battle however also forced Ver Huell's flotilla to anchor in the port of Calais. A number of Batavian vessels, which remained at Dunkirk, now joined the rest of the flotilla without danger. In the morning of the next day, however, Ver Huell's flotilla was again attacked by 19 Royal Navy warships, including two ships of the line and a number of frigates, corvettes and bomb ships, but the British again were forced to withdraw. Ver Huell was however forced to leave several vessels behind for repairs.

== Battle ==
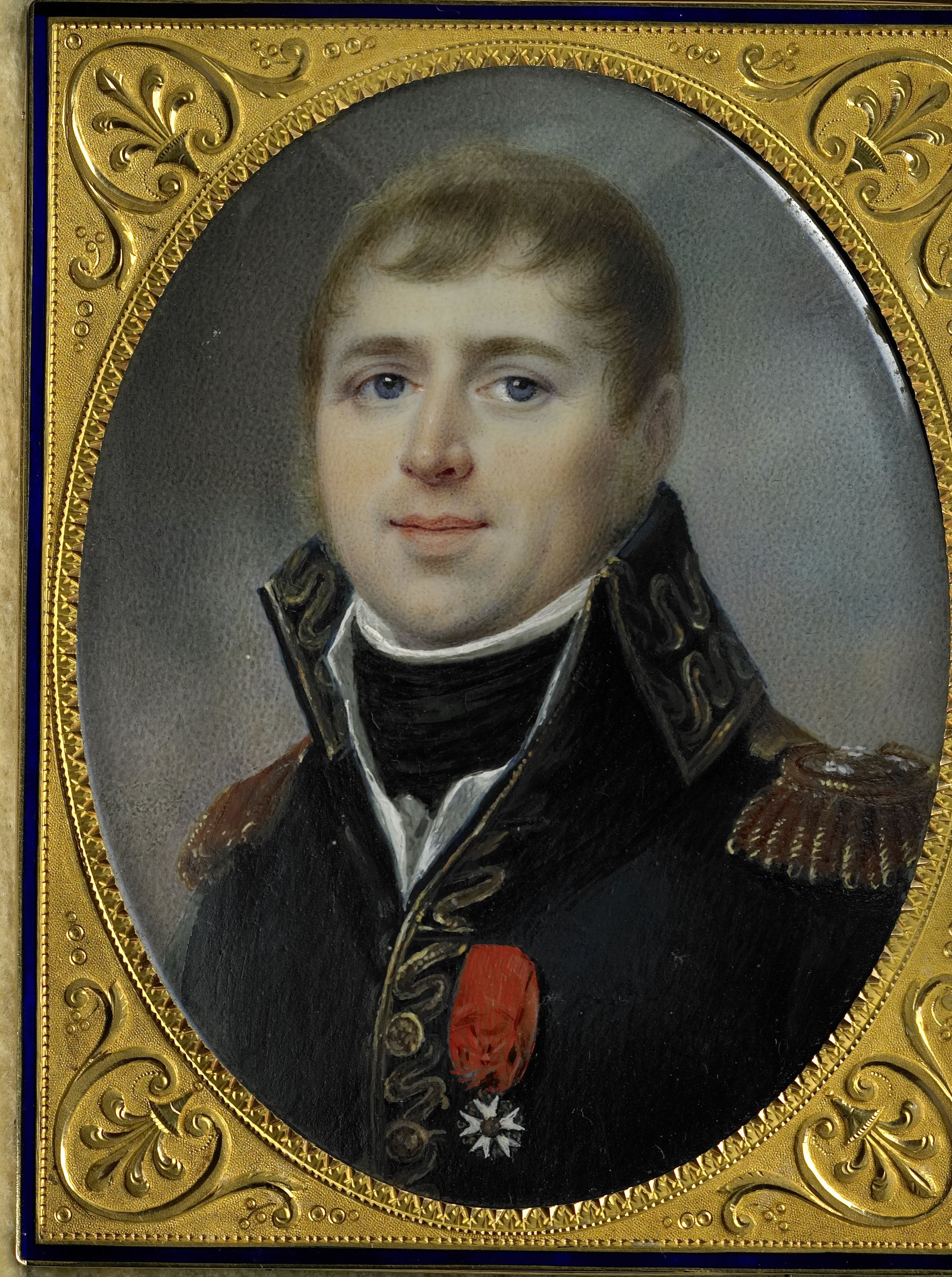
Carel Hendrik Ver Huell.

On 18 July at 15:00, Ver Huell's flotilla, which consisted of 21 Batavian gunboats and 3 French prams, finally set sail from Calais. Also accompanying the flotilla as an observer was Louis-Nicolas Davout, who had joined the flotilla in Calais. Ver Huell aboard the Heemskerk and his flotilla, came into contact with a British fleet led by Admiral of the Blue Lord Keith consisting of 45 warships in between the capes of Cap Blanc-Nez and Cap Gris Nez around 17:00. Exactly at this moment, Ver Huell sailed around Blanc-Nez at a point where the depth of the coast made it impossible for the French land batteries to support his ships.

The British, who had been on the lookout for the flotilla, was much stronger than Ver Huell's ships, which had fewer guns and fewer vessels at their disposal. They subsequently initiated a full attack, and several British ships soon pressed close to the Franco-Batavian flotilla but were forced to move out of range. the British were therefore unable to prevent the Franco-Batavian flotilla from continuing its course towards Griz Nez. In order to approach the extreme corner of the cape, it was necessary for Ver Huell's ships to move further out to sea, which exposed them to more fire from the British ships, who could now aim their guns at a shorter distance, sometimes within pistol range. In addition, the cape had to be bypassed, a maneuver that brought every ship of the flotilla within range of the fire of the entire British fleet. The small Batavian ships, however, offered little surface area for British gunners while the larger Royal Navy warships provided a much easier target.

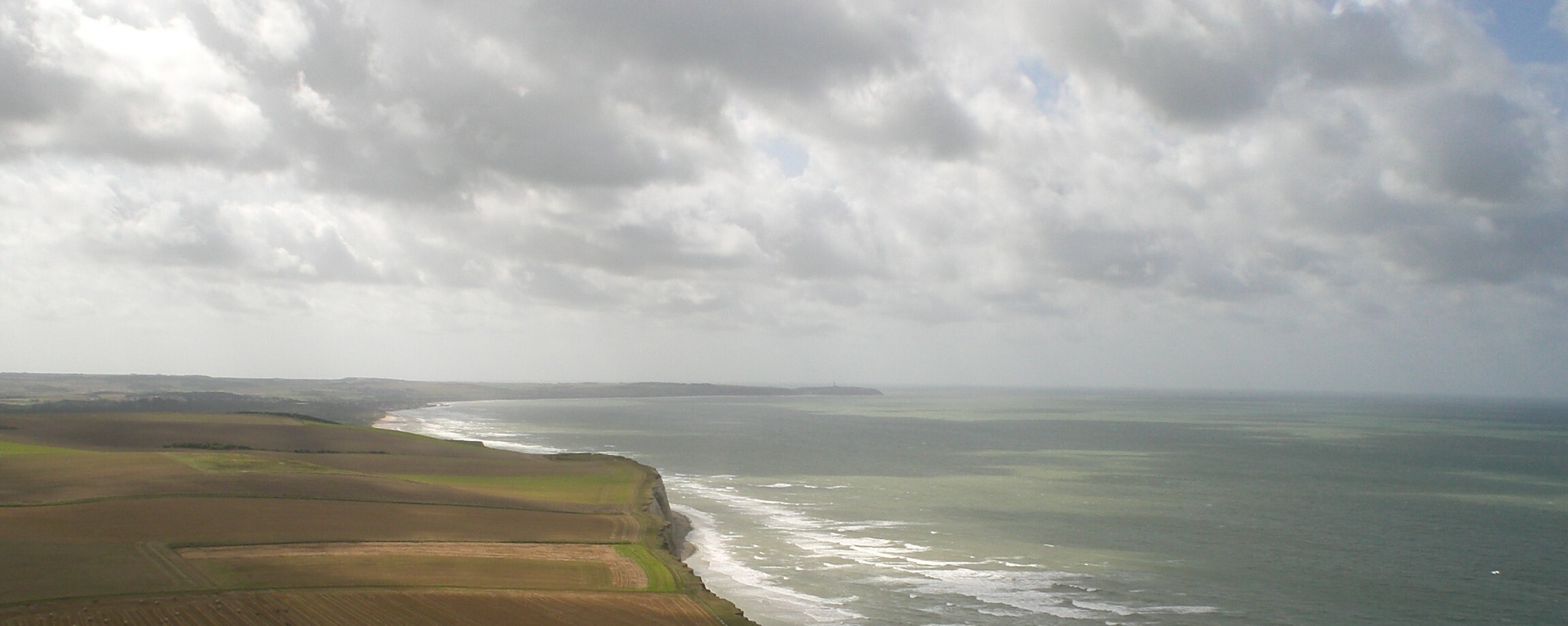
Cap Gris-Nez (in the background), pictured from Cap Blanc-Nez.

Despite the heavy fire, Ver Huell's contingent reached Griz Nez in good order. The British subsequently regrouped their ships and aimed their guns at a point where every vessel of the flotilla would have to pass. Every ship in Keith's fleet, a gunshot away from the cape, took up a position. One section tried to encircle the Franco-Batavian vanguard, while another shot at Ver Huell's flotilla from the side and tried to cut off its path. Despite heavy British fire, the leading gunboat, which Ver Huell was commanding, sailed around the cape without issue. Because Ver Huell had ensured that the order of battle of his flotilla was very tight, so that it could not be cut off, the British were unable to prevent the Franco-Batavian flotilla from reaching the coast safely, and it eventually anchored between Audresselles and Ambleteuse. After one last British attack on the Batavian gunboats, the French coastal batteries, now in range, managed to force them to head out back to sea. Around 20:00 the battle was over.

== Aftermath ==
With the trip around Cape Griz Nez, another Batavian flotilla, of 84 vessels, was also able to make the trip from the port of Dunkirk to Amblateuse unscathed. Ver Huell was showered with praise in France. In the Batavian Republic however, the victory was barely celebrated. Despite this feat, events elsewhere meant that the planned invasion of Britain was ultimately called off.

== Gallery ==
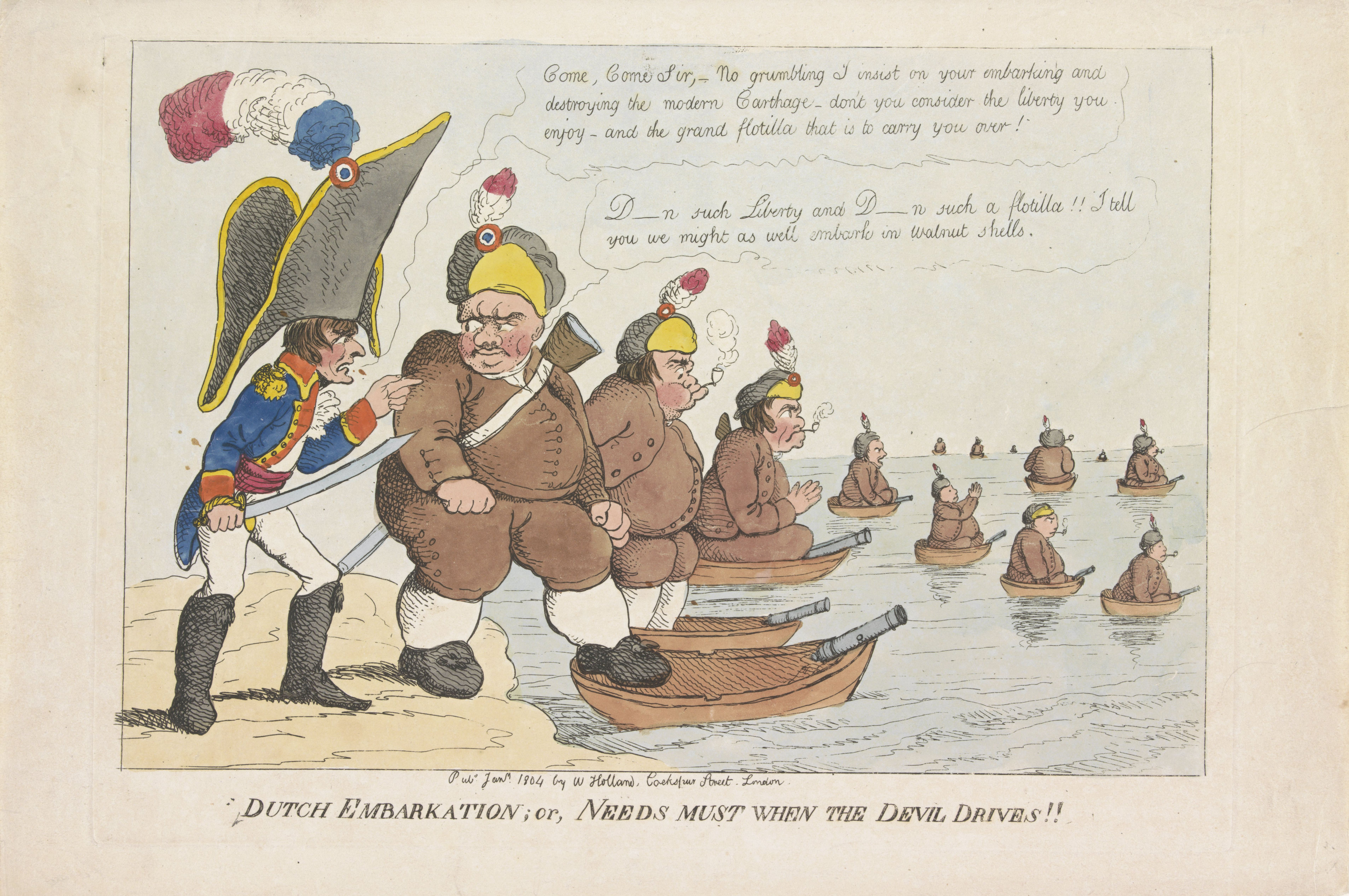
British cartoon mocking the embarkation of the Batavian fleet in 1804.

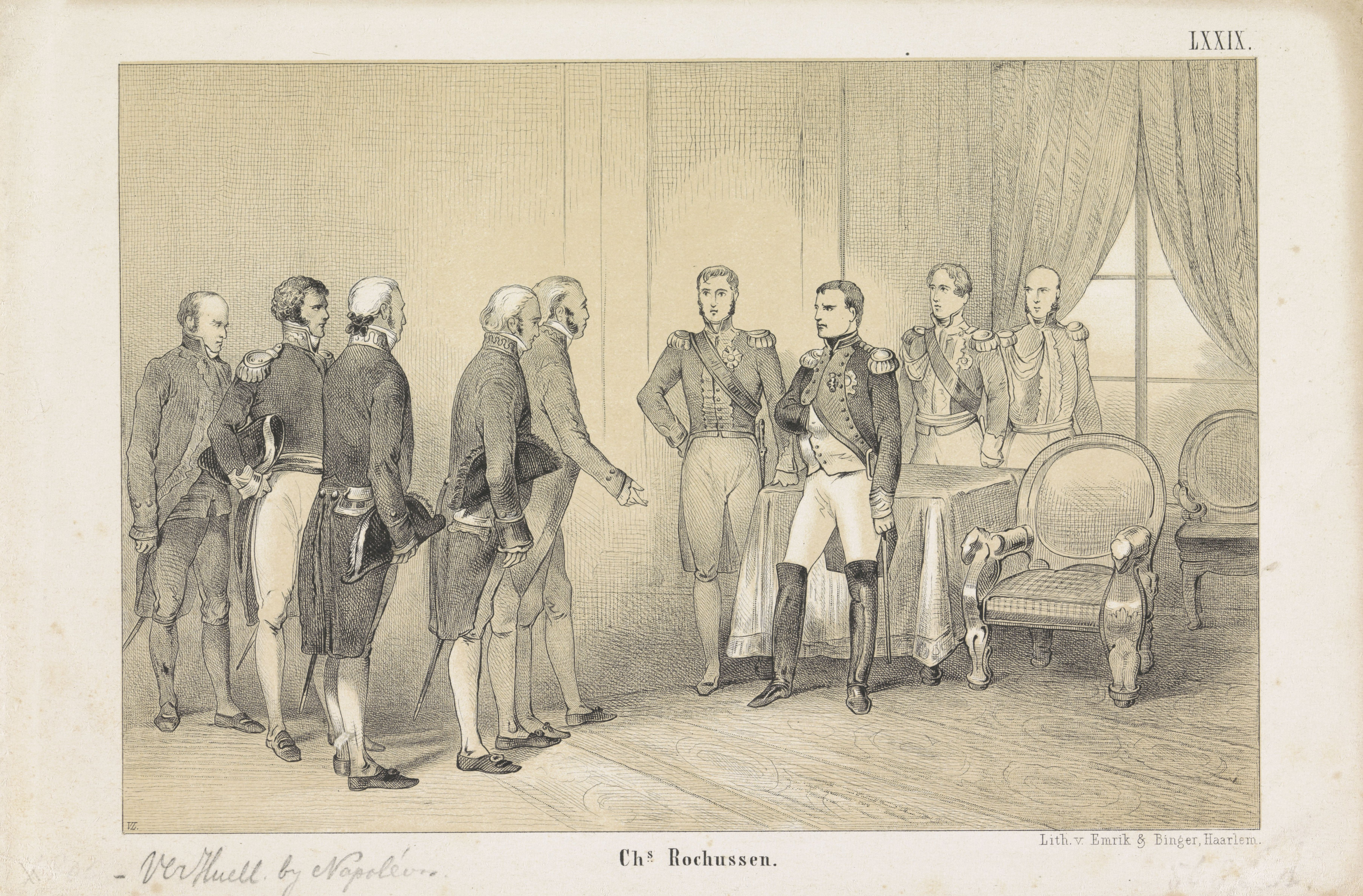
Ver Huell as head of a Batavian delegation meets with Napoleon to argue for the preservation of the Batavian Republic, 1806.

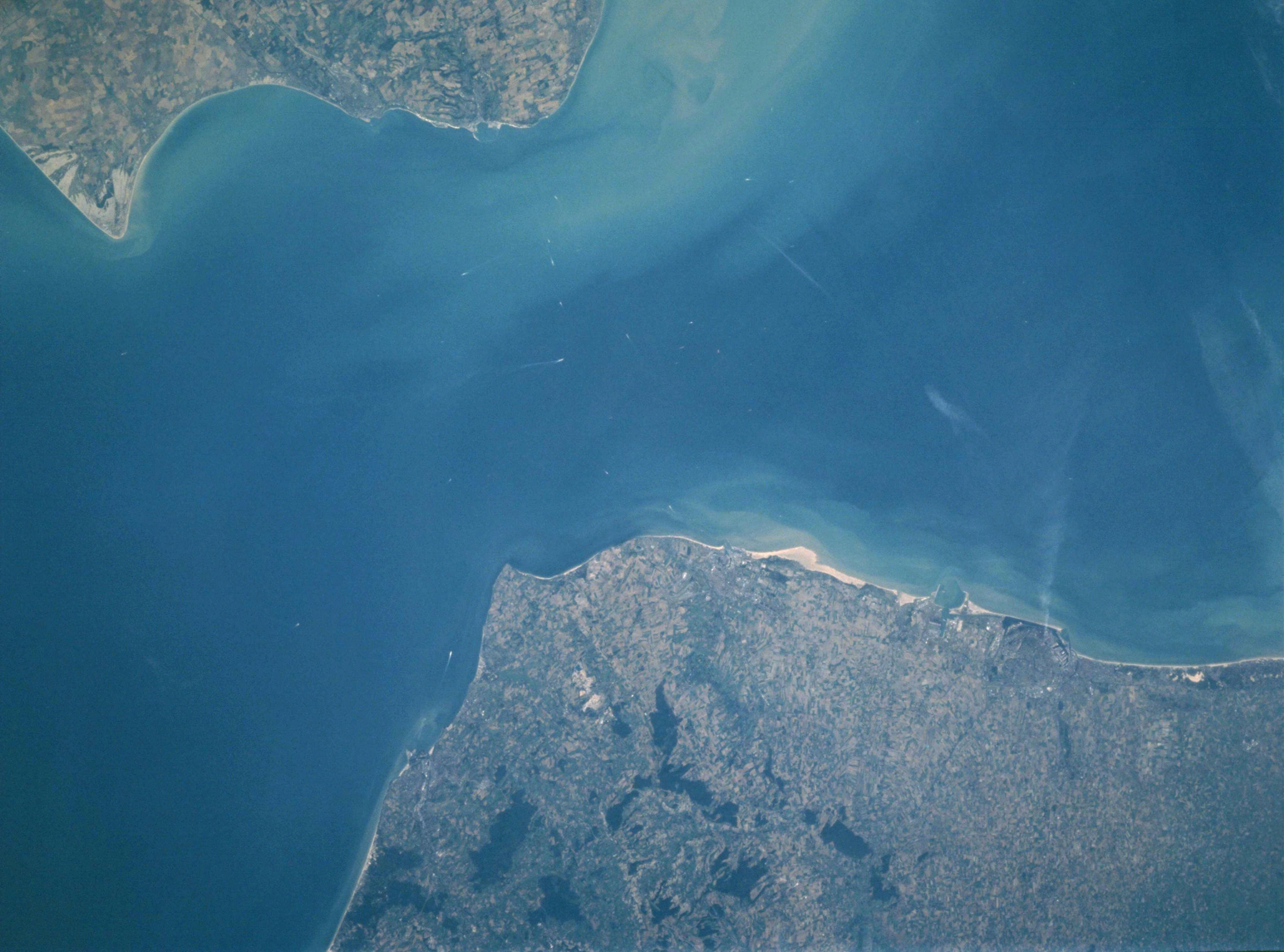
The Strait of Dover from above. The form of Cape Gris-Nez is clearly visible on the coast of France (the southern Coast).

== Sources ==
- de Jonge, Johannes Cornelis (1862). Geschiedenis van het Nederlandsche zeewezen Deel 5 (in Dutch). A.C. Kruseman.
- Van der Aa, Abraham Jacob (1876). "Ver-Huell". Biographisch woordenboek der Nederlanden. Deel 19 (in Dutch).
- Blok, P.J.; Molhuysen, P.C. (1914). "Ver Huell". Nieuw Nederlandsch biografisch woordenboek. Deel 3 (in Dutch).
