= Marshal of Holland =

Honorary title in the Kingdom of Holland

Marshal of Holland (Dutch: Maarschalk van Holland; French: Maréchal de Hollande) was an honorary title bestowed on military leaders of the Kingdom of Holland, a client state of Napoleon's French Empire which encompassed most of the modern-day state of the Netherlands. The title was based on Marshal of the Empire, installed by Napoleon in 1804 to replace the previous title Marshal of France.

After Napoleon's brother Louis Bonaparte was crowned King of Holland in 1806, Louis created the title Marshal of Holland by decree on 21 December of that year. On Napoleon's orders, Louis rescinded the title four years later, on 4 February 1810, some months before Napoleon removed Louis from the throne and incorporated Holland into his French empire. The marshals were compensated with new imperial titles, such as Comte de l'Empire.

The title Marshal of Holland was not equal to the rank of field marshal (veldmaarschalk). This rank had been dropped when the Batavian Republic was installed in 1795, and was not restored until the end of the Napoleonic era. The first to be given the rank, on 7 May 1815 (about a month before the Battle of Waterloo), was Arthur Wellesley, 1st Duke of Wellington. In 1914, the rank of field marshal was again rescinded, and is no longer in use in the Dutch military today.

== Recipients ==
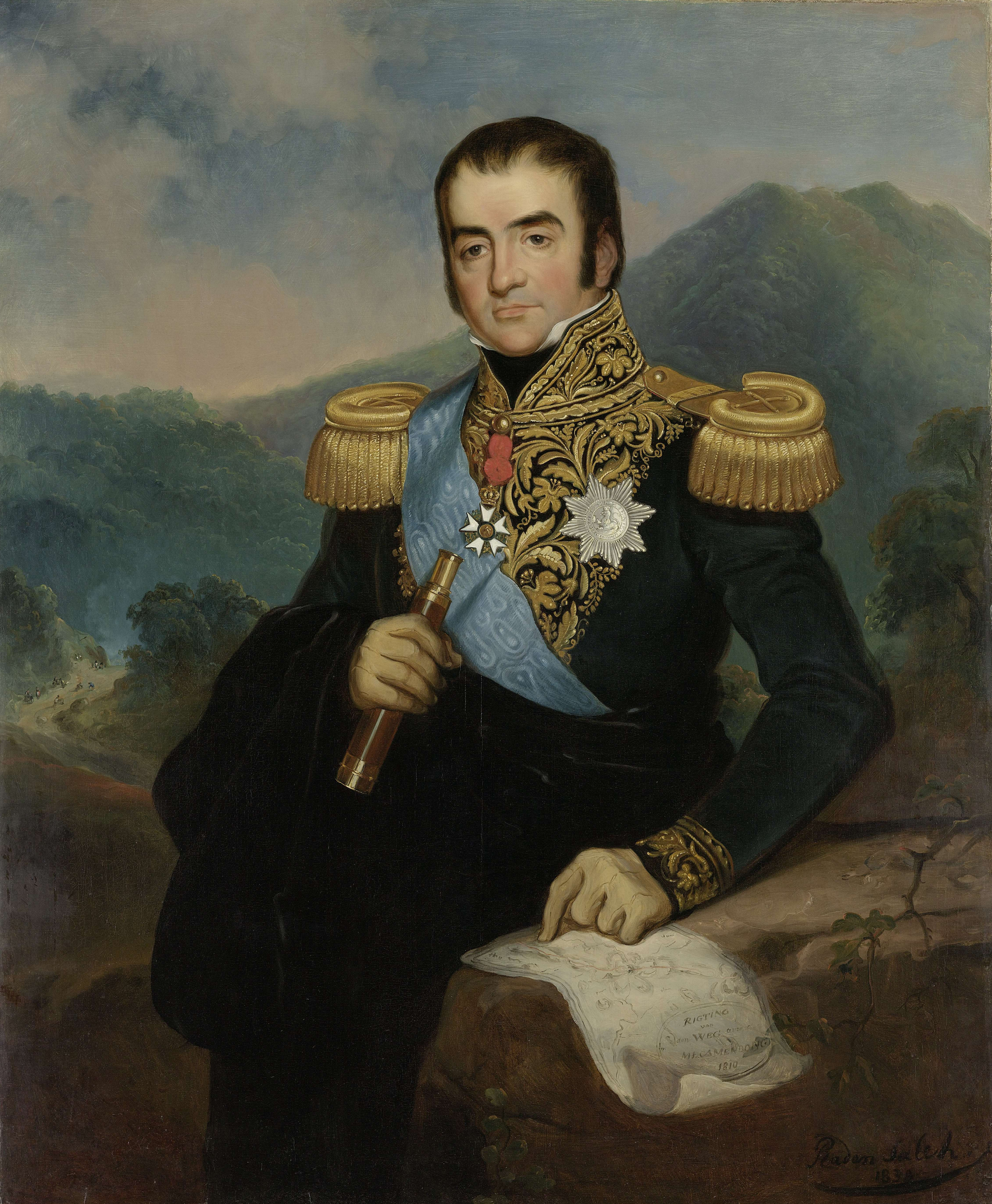
Herman Willem Daendels (1762–1818)

The title Marshal of Holland was bestowed on the following military leaders of the Kingdom of Holland:

- Carel Hendrik Ver Huell (1764–1845), admiral, created Marshal of Holland on 21 December 1806
- Jan Willem de Winter (1761–1812), admiral, created Marshal of Holland on 21 December 1806
- Jean-Baptiste Dumonceau (1760–1821), general, created Marshal of Holland on 21 December 1806
- Jan Hendrik van Kinsbergen (1735–1819), admiral, created Marshal of Holland on 21 December 1806
- Philip Julius van Zuylen van Nijevelt (1743–1826), general, created Marshal of Holland on 21 December 1806
- Herman Willem Daendels (1762–1818), general, created Marshal of Holland in February 1807
