= Camp of Boulogne =

Two military camps in France

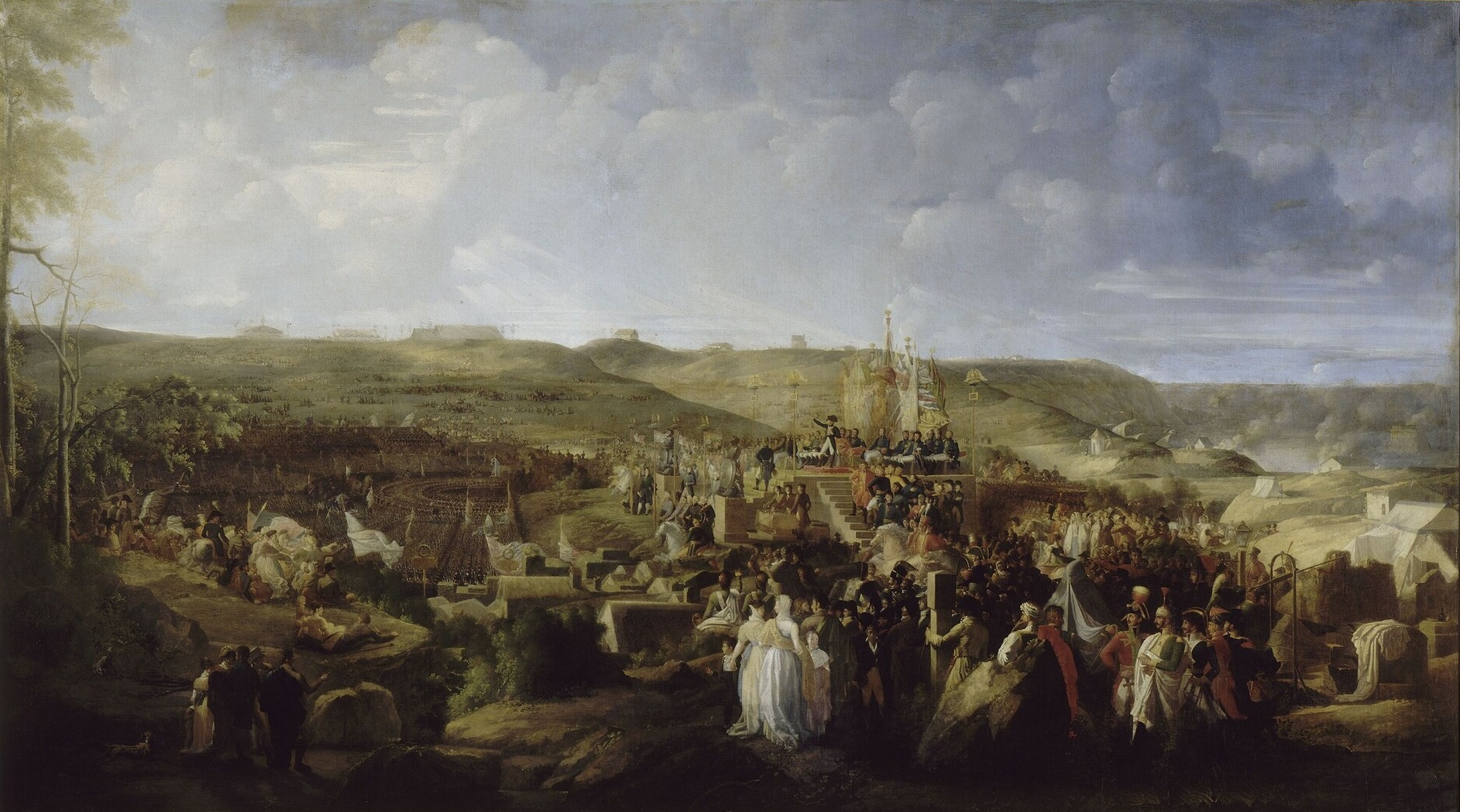
Napoleon distributing the Legion of Honor at the camp on 16 August 1804

The Camp of Boulogne refers to two military camps established around Boulogne-sur-Mer in France.

== First camp ==
The first camp was prepared by Julius Caesar in 54 BC to prepare the fleet for his second expedition to Britain. One hypothesis is that Caesar set up his camp at the current location of the old City of Boulogne-sur-Mer. Some historians believe that the Old City was built on the camp; at a vicinity to Itius port which he cites in Chapter IV of its Gallic Wars:

Caesar returns in Hither Gaul, and from there to the army. When he got there, he visited all neighbourhoods, and finds that the singular activity of the soldiers had managed, despite extreme shortages of all things, to build about six hundred ships of the form described above and twenty eight galleys, all ready for sea in a few days. After giving praise to soldiers and those who had led the work, he instructs his intentions and ordered them to go all the Itius port, where he knew the ride in Brittany is very convenient, the distance this island to the mainland being only thirty thousand steps.

== Second camp ==
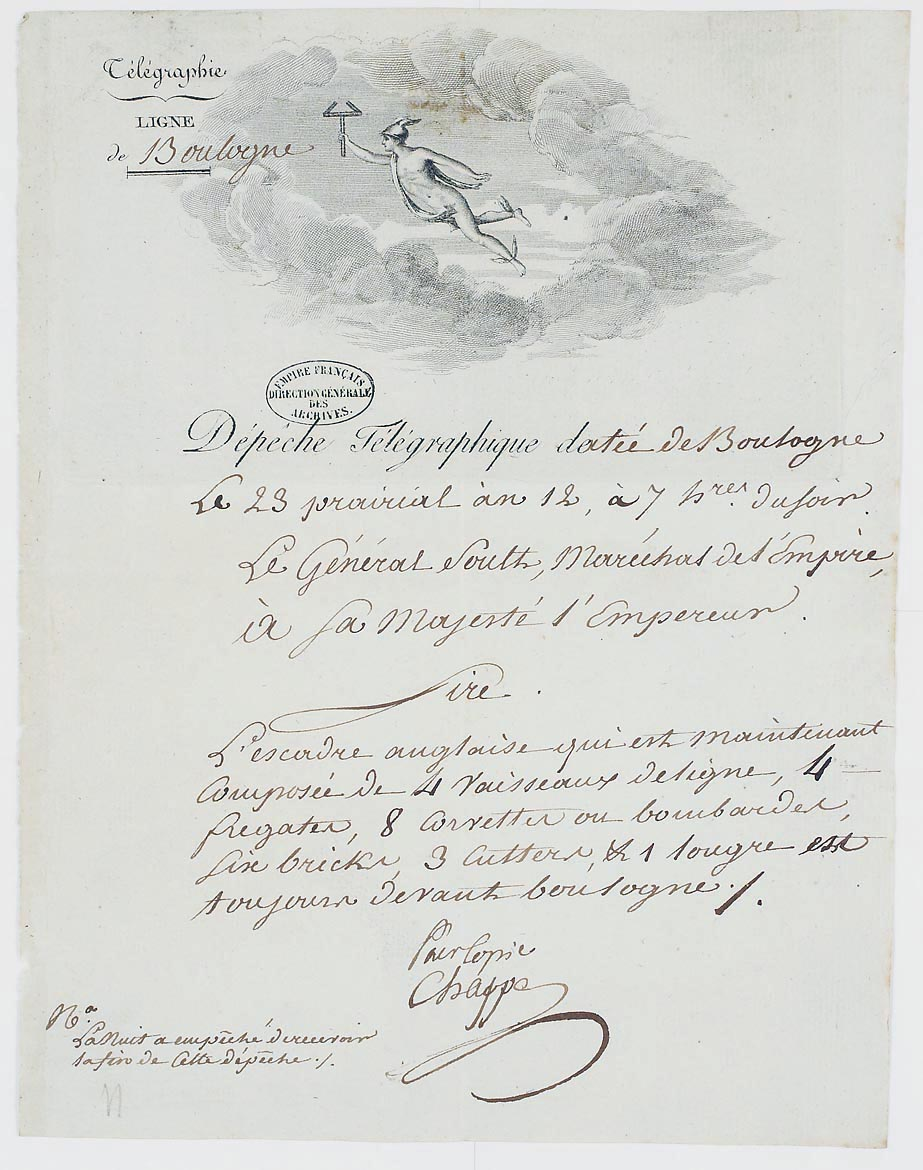
Telegram sent on 12 June 1804 by Jean-de-Dieu Soult to Napoleon informing him that a British squadron is still before Boulogne

The second camp was established by Napoleon in 1803 and continued until 1805. It was here he assembled the Armée des côtes de l'Océan (Army of the Ocean Coasts) or the Armée d'Angleterre (Army of England) to invade Great Britain. On 18 May 1803, Britain declared war on France. Napoleon proceeded to choose Boulogne-sur-Mer as a base for attacks. The Boulogne camp housed about 60,000 soldiers in 1805, and was divided into two large camps:

- one on the left bank of the Liana, near d'Outreau
- another in the area of Vallon Terlincthun and the plateau of the tour d'Order

At the top of the cliff were the command barracks, including that of Napoleon, but the headquarters was located at Castle of Pont-de-Briques.

== Related articles ==
- Camp de Montreuil

== Bibliography ==
- Fernand Nicolaÿ, Napoléon I^{er} au camp de Boulogne, Paris, Perrin et cie, 1907. OCLC 1901969
- Albert Chatelle, Napoléon et la Légion d'honneur au camp de Boulogne, 1801-1805, Paris, Lajeunesse, 1956. OCLC 5047474
- Daniel Haigneré et Augustus Henry Pitt-Rivers, Étude sur le Portus Itius de Jules César : réfutation d'un mémoire de F. de Saulcy, Paris, Renouard, 1862. OCLC 55585755

=== External links ===
- Synthetic note on the first distribution of the Legion of Honor at the Boulogne Camp August 16, 1804
