= 1853 Dutch general election =

General elections were held in the Netherlands on 17 May 1853. They followed the dissolution of the House of Representatives as a result of a government crisis caused by the restoration of the episcopal hierarchy.

The result of the elections was a defeat for Prime Minister Johan Rudolph Thorbecke and his liberals. Only the province of Groningen and Twente remained a liberal stronghold. The conservative Van Hall-Donker Curtius cabinet thus received ample support in the House of Representatives and Floris Adriaan van Hall became prime minister. However, the restoration of the episcopal hierarchy that had caused the government crisis was not reversed, although the Roman Catholic Church was restricted in its freedom of movement by the introduction of the Law on Church Societies.

== Background ==
During the Constitutional Reform of 1848, the Catholic Church was allowed to determine ecclesiastical divisions within the Netherlands in the context of the separation of church and state. In 1853 this law was applied, and Pope Pius IX divided the Netherlands into five dioceses, including an archdiocese in Utrecht. Among the Dutch Protestants, there was much dislike of this action, which culminated in the April movement. The submission of the complaints by the April movement to King William III led to a crisis between the king and the Thorbecke I cabinet, which felt that the king had answered the April movement too positively and had not been sufficiently neutral. As a result, the cabinet resigned and the House of Representatives was dissolved.

According to the electoral law in force at the time, this was an exceptional situation: normally half the House was elected every two years, and not the House as a whole.

== Results ==
Party	Votes	%	Seats
Conservatives			26
Liberals			25
Conservative Liberals			9
Anti-Revolutionaries			8
Total			68
Total votes	60,432	–	
Registered voters/turnout	85,076	71.03	
Source: Bromley & Kossman, Nohlen & Stöver

=== By district ===
District	Members elected	Group	Ref.
Alkmaar	Cornelis van Foreest	Conservative	
Alkmaar	Jan Jacob Rochussen (Note: Incumbent.)	Conservative	
Almelo	Wolter Robert van Hoëvell	Thorbeckian liberal	
Almelo	Maximiliaan Jacob de Man	Pragmatic liberal	
Amersfoort	Frederik van Rappard	Conservative	
Amersfoort	Johan Frederik van Reede van Oudtshoorn	Anti-revolutionary	
Amsterdam	Joannes Bosscha	Conservative	
Amsterdam	Siebert Rudolph van Franck	Conservative	
Amsterdam	Michel Henry Godefroi	Pragmatic liberal	
Amsterdam	Gerrit Schimmelpenninck	Conservative	
Amsterdam	Harm Stolte	Conservative	
Appingedam	Rembertus Westerhoff	Thorbeckian liberal	
Appingedam	Jan Freerks Zijlker	Thorbeckian liberal	
Arnhem	Willem van Lynden	Anti-revolutionary	
Arnhem	Æneas Mackay	Anti-revolutionary	
Assen	Louis van Heiden Reinestein	Conservative	
Assen	Petrus van der Veen	Pragmatic liberal	
Boxmeer	Johannes Hengst	Pragmatic liberal	
Breda	Karel Adrianus Meeussen	Thorbeckian liberal	
Breda	Lambertus Dominicus Storm	Thorbeckian liberal	
Delft	Cornelis Hoekwater	Conservative	
Delft	Willem Wintgens	Pragmatic liberal	
Den Bosch	Johannes Luyben	Conservative liberal	
Den Bosch	Johannes de Poorter	Thorbeckian liberal	
Den Haag	Willem Boreel van Hogelanden	Pragmatic liberal	
Den Haag	Julius Constantijn Rijk	Conservative	
Deventer	Carel Storm van 's Gravesande	Pragmatic liberal	
Dokkum	Isaäc ter Bruggen Hugenholtz	Thorbeckian liberal	
Dordrecht	Johannes Dirk van der Poel	Conservative	
Dordrecht	Pieter Adriaan Sander	Conservative	
Eindhoven	Johannes Baptista Bots	Thorbeckian liberal	
Eindhoven	Petrus van den Heuvel	Pragmatic liberal	
Goes	Joannes Jacobus van Deinse	Conservative	
Gorinchem	Pieter Jacob Elout van Soeterwoude	Anti-revolutionary	
Gouda	Willem Maurits de Brauw	Conservative	
Gouda	Mari Aert Frederic Henri Hoffmann	Conservative	
Groningen	Steven Blaupot ten Cate	Pragmatic liberal	
Haarlem	Willem Hendrik van Voorst	Pragmatic liberal	
Hoorn	Dirk van Akerlaken	Pragmatic liberal	
Hoorn	Johannes Donker Hendrikszoon	Conservative	
Leeuwarden	Jan Bieruma Oosting	Conservative	
Leeuwarden	Jacob Dirks	Conservative	
Leiden	Daniël Théodore Gevers van Endegeest	Conservative	
Leiden	Pieter Hendrik Taets van Amerongen	Conservative	
Maastricht	Johan Rudolph Thorbecke	Thorbeckian liberal	
Maastricht	Edmond van Wintershoven	Thorbeckian liberal	
Middelburg	Jan Jacob Slicher van Domburg	Conservative	
Middelburg	Daniël van Eck	Thorbeckian liberal	
Nijmegen	Gustaaf Dommer van Poldersveldt	Conservative (Catholic)	
Nijmegen	Joannes van Nispen van Sevenaer	Pragmatic liberal	
Roermond	Pieter Lodewijk de Lom de Berg	Conservative (Catholic)	
Roermond	Martin Pascal Hubert Strens	Pragmatic liberal	
Rotterdam	Jean Chrétien Baud	Conservative	
Rotterdam	Peter van Bosse	Pragmatic liberal	
Sneek	Willem Engelbart Engelen	Conservative	
Sneek	Cornelis Sleeswijk Vening	Conservative	
Steenwijk	Jacob van Lennep	Conservative	
Tiel	Jacob de Kempenaer	Conservative	
Tilburg	Carolus Cornelius Aloysius Beens	Thorbeckian liberal	
Tilburg	Franciscus Johannes Jespers	Thorbeckian liberal	
Utrecht	Hubert Alexander Maurits van Asch van Wijck	Anti-revolutionary	
Utrecht	Jan Karel van Goltstein	Pragmatic liberal	
Zierikzee	Jean François Schuurbeque Boeije	Conservative	
Zuidhorn	Geert Reinders	Pragmatic liberal	
Zutphen	Justinus van der Brugghen	Anti-revolutionary	
Zutphen	Willem Anne Schimmelpenninck van der Oye	Conservative	
Zwolle	Guillaume Groen van Prinsterer	Anti-revolutionary	
Zwolle	Bartholomeus Sloet tot Oldhuis	Thorbeckian liberal	
