= 1850 Dutch general election =

General elections were held in the Netherlands on 27 August 1850.

== Results ==
Party	Votes	%	Seats
Liberals			44
Conservatives			13
Conservative Liberals			8
Anti-Revolutionaries			3
Total			68
Total votes	55,579	–	
Registered voters/turnout	82,249	67.57	
Source: Bromley & Kossman, Nohlen & Stöver

=== By district ===
District	Members elected	Group	Ref.
Alkmaar	Samuel Antony de Moraaz (Note: Incumbent member for Alkmaar.)	Thorbeckian liberal	
Alkmaar	Hendrik Jan Smit (Note: Incumbent member for Zaandam.)	Pragmatic liberal	
Almelo	Wolter Robert van Hoëvell (Note: Incumbent member for Zaltbommel.)	Ethical direction liberal	
Almelo	Maximiliaan Jacob de Man (Note: Incumbent member for Enschede.)	Pragmatic liberal	
Amersfoort	Adriaan Walraven Engelen (Note: Incumbent member for Elst.)	Pragmatic liberal	
Amersfoort	Simon van Walchren (Note: Incumbent member for Amersfoort.)	Pragmatic liberal	
Amsterdam	Cornelis Backer (Note: Incumbent member for Amsterdam II.)	Pragmatic liberal	
Amsterdam	Michel Henry Godefroi (Note: Incumbent member for Amsterdam I.)	Pragmatic liberal	
Amsterdam	Floris Adriaan van Hall (Note: Incumbent member for Amsterdam III.)	Pragmatic liberal	
Amsterdam	Jan Heemskerk Bzn. (Note: Incumbent member for Amsterdam V.)	Thorbeckian liberal	
Amsterdam	Harm Stolte	Conservative	
Appingedam	Rembertus Westerhoff (Note: Incumbent member for Appingedam.)	Thorbeckian liberal	
Appingedam	Jan Freerks Zijlker (Note: Incumbent member for Winschoten.)	Thorbeckian liberal	
Arnhem	Willem van Lynden (Willem van Lynden)	Anti-revolutionary	
Arnhem	Æneas Mackay (Æneas Mackay (1806-1876))	Anti-revolutionary	
Assen	Louis van Heiden Reinestein (Note: Incumbent member for Assen.)	Conservative	
Assen	Petrus van der Veen	Pragmatic liberal	
Boxmeer	Johannes Hengst (Note: Incumbent member for Grave.)	Pragmatic liberal	
Breda	Karel Adrianus Meeussen (Note: Incumbent member for Bergen op Zoom.)	Thorbeckian liberal	
Breda	Lambertus Dominicus Storm (Note: Incumbent member for Breda.)	Thorbeckian liberal	
Delft	Karel Arnoldus Poortman (Note: Incumbent member for Schiedam.)	Thorbeckian liberal	
Delft	Willem Wintgens (Note: Incumbent member for Delft.)	Pragmatic liberal	
Den Bosch	Johannes Luyben (Note: Incumbent member for Den Bosch.)	Conservative liberal	
Den Bosch	Johannes de Poorter	Thorbeckian liberal	
Den Haag	Willem Boreel van Hogelanden (Note: Incumbent member for Den Haag I.)	Pragmatic liberal	
Den Haag	Pieter Carel Schooneveld (Note: Incumbent member for Den Haag II.)	Pragmatic liberal	
Deventer	Carel Storm van 's Gravesande (Note: Incumbent member for Deventer.)	Moderate liberal	
Dokkum	Isaäc ter Bruggen Hugenholtz (Note: Incumbent member for Dokkum.)	Thorbeckian liberal	
Dordrecht	Pieter Blussé van Oud-Alblas	Thorbeckian liberal	
Dordrecht	Johannes Servaas Lotsy (Note: Incumbent member for Dordrecht.)	Pragmatic liberal	
Eindhoven	Johannes Baptista Bots (Note: Incumbent member for Helmond.)	Thorbeckian liberal	
Eindhoven	Johannes Franciscus van der Heijde (Note: Incumbent member for Eindhoven.)	Pragmatic liberal	
Goes	Philip Johannes Bachiene (Note: Incumbent member for Goes.)	Thorbeckian liberal	
Gorinchem	Cornelis Schiffer (Note: Incumbent member for Heusden.)	Conservative	
Gouda	Gijsbertus Martinus van der Linden (Note: Incumbent member for Gouda.)	Thorbeckian liberal	
Gouda	Leonard Metman	Pragmatic liberal	
Groningen	Berend Wichers (Note: Incumbent member for Groningen.)	Thorbeckian liberal	
Haarlem	Willem Hendrik van Voorst (Note: Incumbent member for Haarlem.)	Pragmatic liberal	
Hoorn	Dirk van Akerlaken	Pragmatic liberal	
Hoorn	Willem Jan Cornelis van Hasselt (Note: Incumbent member for Edam.)	Pragmatic liberal	
Leeuwarden	Jacob Dirks (Note: Incumbent member for Franeker.)	Conservative	
Leeuwarden	Adolph Ypeij	Liberal	
Leiden	Daniël Théodore Gevers van Endegeest	Conservative	
Leiden	Pieter Hendrik Taets van Amerongen	Conservative	
Maastricht	Eduardus Josephus Hubertus Borret (Note: Incumbent member for Maastricht.)	Conservative (Catholic)	
Maastricht	Charles de Limpens	Thorbeckian liberal	
Middelburg	Jan Jacob Slicher van Domburg (Note: Incumbent member for Middelburg.)	Pragmatic liberal	
Middelburg	Daniël van Eck (Note: Incumbent member for Sluis.)	Thorbeckian liberal	
Nijmegen	Gustaaf Dommer van Poldersveldt (Note: Incumbent member for Nijmegen.)	Conservative (Catholic)	
Nijmegen	Joannes van Nispen van Sevenaer (Note: Incumbent member for Doetinchem.)	Pragmatic liberal	
Roermond	Pieter Lodewijk de Lom de Berg (Note: Incumbent member for Venlo.)	Conservative (Catholic)	
Roermond	Johan Jacob Anton van Wylick	Pragmatic liberal	
Rotterdam	Jean Chrétien Baud	Conservative	
Rotterdam	Mari Aert Frederic Henri Hoffmann	Conservative	
Sneek	Herman Ulrich Huguenin	Pragmatic liberal	
Sneek	Anne Franszoon Jongstra	Thorbeckian liberal	
Steenwijk	Albertus Jacobus Duymaer van Twist (Note: Incumbent member for Kampen.)	Pragmatic liberal	
Tiel	Edmond Willem van Dam van Isselt	Pragmatic liberal	
Tilburg	Franciscus Johannes Jespers (Note: Incumbent member for Zevenbergen.)	Thorbeckian liberal	
Tilburg	Jacobus Arnoldus Mutsaers (Note: Incumbent member for Tilburg.)	Conservative (Catholic)	
Utrecht	Elisa Cornelis Unico van Doorn (Note: Incumbent member for IJsselstein.)	Conservative	
Utrecht	Jan Karel van Goltstein (Note: Incumbent member for Utrecht.)	Pragmatic liberal	
Zierikzee	Sebastiaan Hendrik Anemaet (Note: Incumbent member for Brielle.)	Thorbeckian liberal	
Zuidhorn	Geert Reinders (Note: Incumbent member for Onderdendam.)	Pragmatic liberal	
Zutphen	Willem Hendrik Dullert (Note: Incumbent member for Zutphen.)	Thorbeckian liberal	
Zutphen	Jacob van Zuylen van Nijevelt (Note: Incumbent member for Ruurlo.)	Thorbeckian liberal	
Zwolle	Guillaume Groen van Prinsterer (Note: Incumbent member for Harderwijk.)	Anti-revolutionary	
Zwolle	Bartholomeus Sloet tot Oldhuis (Note: Incumbent member for Zwolle.)	Thorbeckian liberal	
