= Jacob Boreel =

Dutch diplomat and politician (1630–1697)

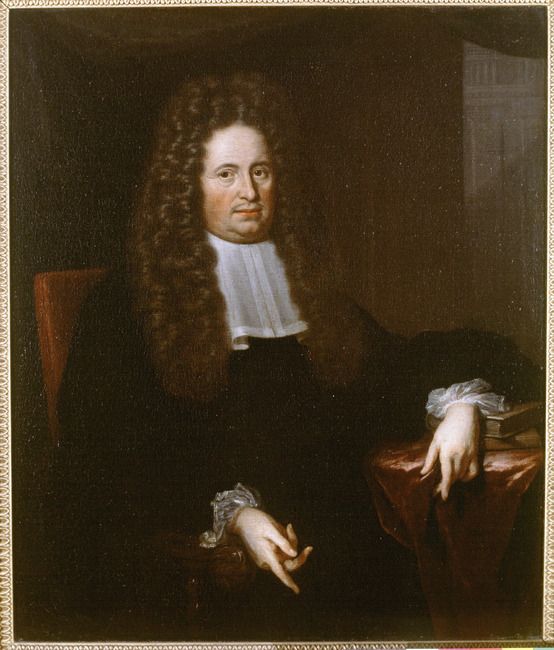
- Portrait of Boreel by Arnold Boonen
- Born: 1 April 1630; Amsterdam
- Died: 21 September 1697 (aged 67); Velsen
- Family: Boreel

Jacob Boreel (1 April 1630, in Amsterdam – 21 August 1697, in Velsen) was a dutch ambassador in France, sheriff and burgomaster of Amsterdam in 1696. He Held the titles knight and Vrijheer of Duinbeek, Westhoven, Sint Aecht und Meerestein.

== Life ==
Jacob Boreel was a scion of the Boreel family. His parents were the Dutch Diplomat and English peer Willem Boreel and Jacoba Carel (1607–1657). Between 1664 and 1665 he travelled through Russia with his friend Nicolaes Witsen. In 1679, he became the ambassador in Paris. He is remembered in Velsen as the owner of the buitenplaats called Beeckestijn, who financed improvements to the house and gardens to the design that has been kept up until today.

In 1690, as a sheriff he was involved in a case with Romeyn de Hooghe. On the day before the mayors were appointed, the house of Boreel on 507 Herengracht was attacked by the mob. All the furniture, mirrors and expensive porcelain were destroyed, taken home, or thrown into the canal. Boreel, overweight and unwell, had to flee over the neighbor's fence.

Boreel had been in contact with persons of the Dutch Golden Age like Johan de Witt, Christiaan Huygens and Pieter de Graeff.
