= Zierikzee (electoral district) =

Dutch electoral district (1848-1918)

Zieikzee was an electoral district of the House of Representatives in the Netherlands from 1848 to 1918.

== Profile ==
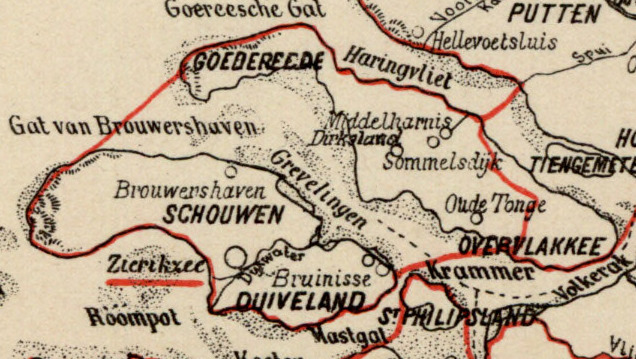
The district of Zierikzee in 1888

The electoral district of Zierikzee was created in 1848 for the first direct election of the House of Representatives. It comprised the islands of Schouwen-Duiveland, Tholen and Sint Philipsland, all part of the province of Zeeland. Zierikzee was retained as a single member district in 1850, although much of Tholen was transferred to the district of Goes, while the island of Goeree-Overflakkee, part of the province of South Holland, was transferred from Brielle to Zierikzee. In 1864, the remainder of Tholen and Sint Philipsland were also transferred to Goes. In 1888, the eastern portion of Goeree-Overflakkee was transferred back to Brielle. The district was predominantly agricultural.

Over the course of its existence, the district's population increased from 18,870 in 1848 to 46,029 in 1909. A significant majority of the population was Reformed, though this proportion gradually dropped from 90.6% in 1848 to 77.8% in 1909. The proportion of the population identified as Gereformeerd was 1.4% in 1848, but grew rapidly in the 1880s, to 10.2% in 1888, and subsequently grew further to 12.1% in 1909. The proportion of Catholics in the district ranged from 4.4% to 8.4%. The share of "Others" peaked in 1909 at 5.7% of the population.

The district of Zierikzee was abolished upon the introduction of party-list proportional representation in 1918.

== Members ==
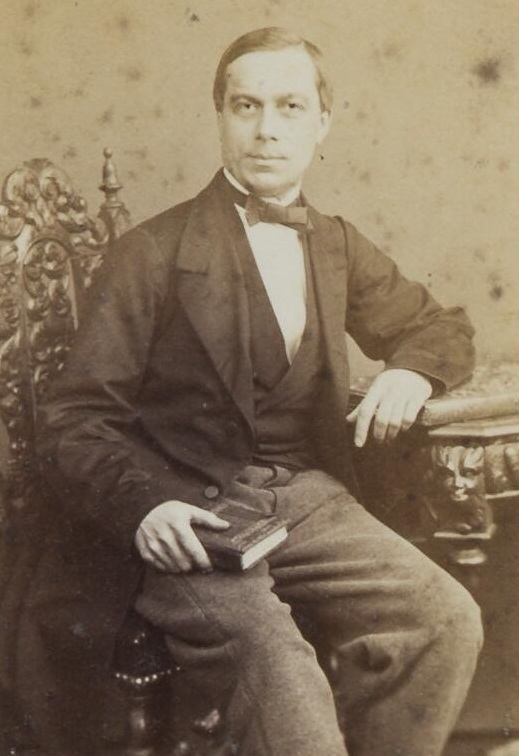
Jacob Johan van Kerkwijk

Throughout its existence, Zierikzee was mostly represented by liberal deputies. Longest-serving among these was Jacob Johan van Kerkwijk, who was first elected in 1863, and continued to represent Zierikzee in the House of Representatives until his death in 1901. The subsequent by-election was won by the Anti-Revolutionary candidate Jozef Jan Pompe van Meerdervoort, but in 1905 the district was won back by the Liberal Rudolf Patijn, who continued to represent the district until its abolition in 1918.

Election	Member	Party	Ref
1848	Gerrit Adriaan Fokker	Ind	
1850	Sebastiaan Hendrik Anemaet	Ind	
1852	Sebastiaan Hendrik Anemaet	Ind	
1853	Jean François Schuurbeque Boeije	Ind	
1854	Sebastiaan Hendrik Anemaet	Ind	
1858	Sebastiaan Hendrik Anemaet	Ind	
1862	Sebastiaan Hendrik Anemaet	Ind	
1863	Jacob Johan van Kerkwijk	Ind	
Jun 1866	Jacob Johan van Kerkwijk	Ind	
Oct 1866	Jacob Johan van Kerkwijk	Ind	
1868	Jacob Johan van Kerkwijk	Ind	
1869	Jacob Johan van Kerkwijk	Ind	
1873	Jacob Johan van Kerkwijk	Ind	
1877	Jacob Johan van Kerkwijk	Ind	
1881	Jacob Johan van Kerkwijk	Ind	
1884	Jacob Johan van Kerkwijk	Ind	
1886	Jacob Johan van Kerkwijk	Ind	
1887	Jacob Johan van Kerkwijk	Ind	
1888	Jacob Johan van Kerkwijk	Lib	
1891	Jacob Johan van Kerkwijk	Lib	
1894	Jacob Johan van Kerkwijk	Lib	
1897	Jacob Johan van Kerkwijk	Lib	
1901	Jozef Jan Pompe van Meerdervoort	AR	
1901	Jozef Jan Pompe van Meerdervoort	AR	
1905	Rudolf Patijn	Lib	
1909	Rudolf Patijn	Lib	
1913	Rudolf Patijn	Lib	
1917	Rudolf Patijn	Lib	

== Election results ==
=== Elections in the 1840s ===
1848 general election: Zierikzee
Candidate	Party	Votes	%
Gerrit Adriaan Fokker	Independent	401	63.65
Willem Kroef	Independent	146	23.17
J.H.L. Vader	Independent	21	3.33
W.D. de Jonge	Independent	10	1.59
Others		52	8.25
Total		630	100.00
Valid votes		630	99.37
Invalid/blank votes		4	0.63
Total votes		634	100.00
Registered voters/turnout		770	82.34
Independent gain			
Source: Kiesraad, Huygens Instituut

=== Elections in the 1850s ===
1850 general election: Zierikzee
Candidate	Party	Votes	%
Sebastiaan Hendrik Anemaet	Independent	480	56.14
Gerrit Adriaan Fokker	Independent	182	21.29
Willem Kroef	Independent	117	13.68
Anthony van Weel	Independent	23	2.69
Abraham Egter	Independent	14	1.64
Others		39	4.56
Total		855	100.00
Valid votes		855	98.96
Invalid/blank votes		9	1.04
Total votes		864	100.00
Registered voters/turnout		1,264	68.35
Independent gain			
Source: Kiesraad, Huygens Instituut

1852 general election: Zierikzee
Candidate	Party	Votes	%
Sebastiaan Hendrik Anemaet	Independent	378	58.79
Gerrit Adriaan Fokker	Independent	120	18.66
Aeneas Mackay	Independent	43	6.69
Willem Kroef	Independent	31	4.82
A.W. van Kerkwijk	Independent	18	2.80
Others		53	8.24
Total		643	100.00
Valid votes		643	98.77
Invalid/blank votes		8	1.23
Total votes		651	100.00
Registered voters/turnout		1,296	50.23
Independent hold			
Source: Kiesraad, Huygens Instituut

1853 general election: Zierikzee
Candidate	Party	First round		Second round	
Candidate	Party	Votes	%	Votes	%
Jean François Schuurbeque Boeije	Independent	346	35.49	516	56.21
Sebastiaan Hendrik Anemaet	Independent	305	31.28	402	43.79
Aeneas Mackay	Independent	205	21.03		
Gerrit Adriaan Fokker	Independent	64	6.56		
Others		55	5.64		
Total		975	100.00	918	100.00
Valid votes		975	99.69	918	98.60
Invalid/blank votes		3	0.31	13	1.40
Total votes		978	100.00	931	100.00
Registered voters/turnout		1,253	78.05	1,253	74.30
Independent gain					
Source: Kiesraad, Huygens Instituut (1, 2)

1854 general election: Zierikzee
Candidate	Party	Votes	%
Sebastiaan Hendrik Anemaet	Independent	487	57.50
Jean François Schuurbeque Boeije	Independent	332	39.20
Others		28	3.31
Total		847	100.00
Valid votes		847	95.60
Invalid/blank votes		39	4.40
Total votes		886	100.00
Registered voters/turnout		1,253	70.71
Independent gain			
Source: Kiesraad, Huygens Instituut

1858 general election: Zierikzee
Candidate	Party	Votes	%
Sebastiaan Hendrik Anemaet	Independent	668	81.66
Jean François Schuurbeque Boeije	Independent	113	13.81
Others		37	4.52
Total		818	100.00
Valid votes		818	96.01
Invalid/blank votes		34	3.99
Total votes		852	100.00
Registered voters/turnout		1,325	64.30
Independent hold			
Source: Kiesraad, Huygens Instituut

=== Elections in the 1860s ===
1862 general election: Zierikzee
Candidate	Party	Votes	%
Sebastiaan Hendrik Anemaet	Independent	530	62.21
Jean François Schuurbeque Boeije	Independent	226	26.53
Gerrit Adriaan Fokker	Independent	40	4.69
Guillaume Groen van Prinsterer	Independent	28	3.29
C. Goekoop	Independent	16	1.88
Others		12	1.41
Total		852	100.00
Valid votes		852	94.67
Invalid/blank votes		48	5.33
Total votes		900	100.00
Registered voters/turnout		1,393	64.61
Independent hold			
Source: Kiesraad, Huygens Instituut

1963 Zierikzee by-election
Candidate	Party	First round		Second round	
Candidate	Party	Votes	%	Votes	%
Jacob Johan van Kerkwijk	Independent	341	30.34	612	54.30
Jean François Schuurbeque Boeije	Independent	313	27.85	515	45.70
C. Goekoop	Independent	119	10.59		
W.F. del Campo	Independent	117	10.41		
J.E. van den Broek	Independent	74	6.58		
Otto van Wassenaer van Catwijck	Independent	74	6.58		
D. van Weel	Independent	57	5.07		
Others		29	2.58		
Total		1,124	100.00	1,127	100.00
Valid votes		1,124	97.91	1,127	98.77
Invalid/blank votes		24	2.09	14	1.23
Total votes		1,148	100.00	1,141	100.00
Registered voters/turnout		1,393	82.41	1,393	81.91
Independent gain					
Source: Kiesraad, Huygens Instituut (1, 2)

June 1866 general election: Zierikzee
Candidate	Party	Votes	%
Jacob Johan van Kerkwijk	Independent	754	83.41
Jean François Schuurbeque Boeije	Independent	107	11.84
Pieter Philip van Bosse	Independent	23	2.54
Others		20	2.21
Total		904	100.00
Valid votes		904	97.10
Invalid/blank votes		27	2.90
Total votes		931	100.00
Registered voters/turnout		1,288	72.28
Independent hold			
Source: Kiesraad, Huygens Instituut

October 1866 general election: Zierikzee
Candidate	Party	Votes	%
Jacob Johan van Kerkwijk	Independent	725	72.21
Jean François Schuurbeque Boeije	Independent	178	17.73
J.L. Bernhardi	Independent	30	2.99
A. de Vlieger	Independent	26	2.59
Others		45	4.48
Total		1,004	100.00
Valid votes		1,004	97.76
Invalid/blank votes		23	2.24
Total votes		1,027	100.00
Registered voters/turnout		1,288	79.74
Independent hold			
Source: Kiesraad, Huygens Instituut

1868 general election: Zierikzee
Candidate	Party	Votes	%
Jacob Johan van Kerkwijk	Independent	705	71.87
Jean François Schuurbeque Boeije	Independent	222	22.63
J.E. van den Broek	Independent	16	1.63
Others		38	3.87
Total		981	100.00
Valid votes		981	98.79
Invalid/blank votes		12	1.21
Total votes		993	100.00
Registered voters/turnout		1,297	76.56
Independent hold			
Source: Kiesraad, Huygens Instituut

1869 general election: Zierikzee
Candidate	Party	Votes	%
Jacob Johan van Kerkwijk	Independent	788	82.34
D. van Weel	Independent	102	10.66
Alex Schimmelpenninck van der Oye	Independent	39	4.08
Others		28	2.93
Total		957	100.00
Valid votes		957	97.85
Invalid/blank votes		21	2.15
Total votes		978	100.00
Registered voters/turnout		1,340	72.99
Independent hold			
Source: Kiesraad, Huygens Instituut

=== Elections in the 1870s ===
1873 general election: Zierikzee
Candidate	Party	Votes	%
Jacob Johan van Kerkwijk	Independent	738	73.80
Johan Louis de Jonge	Independent	234	23.40
Jacob van Tets van Goudriaan	Independent	22	2.20
Others		6	0.60
Total		1,000	100.00
Valid votes		1,000	99.11
Invalid/blank votes		9	0.89
Total votes		1,009	100.00
Registered voters/turnout		1,422	70.96
Independent hold			
Source: Kiesraad, Huygens Instituut

1877 general election: Zierikzee
Candidate	Party	Votes	%
Jacob Johan van Kerkwijk	Independent	811	88.25
A. de Vlieger	Independent	100	10.88
Others		8	0.87
Total		919	100.00
Valid votes		919	99.24
Invalid/blank votes		7	0.76
Total votes		926	100.00
Registered voters/turnout		1,427	64.89
Independent hold			
Source: Kiesraad, Huygens Instituut

=== Elections in the 1880s ===
1881 general election: Zierikzee
Candidate	Party	Votes	%
Jacob Johan van Kerkwijk	Independent	711	68.90
H. Schonejongen Jz.	AR	175	16.96
H. Schonejongen Jacobsz.	Independent	124	12.02
Others		22	2.13
Total		1,032	100.00
Valid votes		1,032	99.23
Invalid/blank votes		8	0.77
Total votes		1,040	100.00
Registered voters/turnout		1,468	70.84
Independent hold			
Source: Kiesraad, Huygens Instituut

1884 general election: Zierikzee
Candidate	Party	Votes	%
Jacob Johan van Kerkwijk	Independent	784	65.66
Alexander de Savornin Lohman	AR	406	34.00
Others		4	0.34
Total		1,194	100.00
Valid votes		1,194	98.92
Invalid/blank votes		13	1.08
Total votes		1,207	100.00
Registered voters/turnout		1,465	82.39
Independent hold			
Source: Kiesraad, Huygens Instituut

1886 general election: Zierikzee
Candidate	Party	Votes	%
Jacob Johan van Kerkwijk	Independent	864	64.09
Alexander de Savornin Lohman	AR	481	35.68
Others		3	0.22
Total		1,348	100.00
Valid votes		1,348	99.19
Invalid/blank votes		11	0.81
Total votes		1,359	100.00
Registered voters/turnout		1,557	87.28
Independent hold			
Source: Kiesraad, Huygens Instituut

1887 general election: Zierikzee
Candidate	Party	Votes	%
Jacob Johan van Kerkwijk	Independent	830	82.83
Alexander de Savornin Lohman	AR	167	16.67
Others		5	0.50
Total		1,002	100.00
Valid votes		1,002	98.43
Invalid/blank votes		16	1.57
Total votes		1,018	100.00
Registered voters/turnout		1,517	67.11
Independent hold			
Source: Kiesraad, Huygens Instituut

1888 general election: Zierikzee
Candidate	Party	Votes	%
Jacob Johan van Kerkwijk	Lib	1,797	56.96
Dammes P. D. Fabius	AR	1,351	42.82
Others		7	0.22
Total		3,155	100.00
Valid votes		3,155	99.56
Invalid/blank votes		14	0.44
Total votes		3,169	100.00
Registered voters/turnout		3,457	91.67
Liberal hold			
Source: Kiesraad, Huygens Instituut

=== Elections in the 1890s ===
1891 general election: Zierikzee
Candidate	Party	Votes	%
Jacob Johan van Kerkwijk	Lib	1,852	64.94
Dammes P. D. Fabius	AR	990	34.71
Others		10	0.35
Total		2,852	100.00
Valid votes		2,852	99.13
Invalid/blank votes		25	0.87
Total votes		2,877	100.00
Registered voters/turnout		3,443	83.56
Liberal hold			
Source: Kiesraad, Huygens Instituut

1894 general election: Zierikzee
Candidate	Party	Votes	%
Jacob Johan van Kerkwijk	Lib	1,657	67.22
Theo Heemskerk	AR	630	25.56
Johan George Gleichman	Lib	168	6.82
Others		10	0.41
Total		2,465	100.00
Valid votes		2,465	98.96
Invalid/blank votes		26	1.04
Total votes		2,491	100.00
Registered voters/turnout		3,379	73.72
Liberal hold			
Source: Kiesraad, Huygens Instituut

1897 general election: Zierikzee
Candidate	Party	Votes	%
Jacob Johan van Kerkwijk	Lib	3,404	63.66
Theo Heemskerk	AR	1,943	36.34
Total		5,347	100.00
Valid votes		5,347	99.26
Invalid/blank votes		40	0.74
Total votes		5,387	100.00
Registered voters/turnout		6,315	85.30
Liberal hold			
Source: Kiesraad, Huygens Instituut

=== Elections in the 1900s ===
1901 general election: Zierikzee
Candidate	Party	Votes	%
Jozef Jan Pompe van Meerdervoort	AR	2,713	52.43
J.A. de Bruijne	Lib	2,462	47.57
Total		5,175	100.00
Valid votes		5,175	99.44
Invalid/blank votes		29	0.56
Total votes		5,204	100.00
Registered voters/turnout		5,919	87.92
Anti-Revolutionary gain			
Source: Kiesraad, Huygens Instituut

1901 Zierikzee by-election
Candidate	Party	Votes	%
Jozef Jan Pompe van Meerdervoort	AR		
Total			
Registered voters/turnout		5,919	–
Anti-Revolutionary hold			
Source: Kiesraad, Huygens Instituut

1905 general election: Zierikzee
Candidate	Party	First round		Second round	
Candidate	Party	Votes	%	Votes	%
Rudolf Patijn	Lib	3,339	49.34	3,709	52.92
Jozef Jan Pompe van Meerdervoort	AR	3,195	47.21	3,300	47.08
Willem Vliegen	SDAP	234	3.46		
Total		6,768	100.00	7,009	100.00
Valid votes		6,768	98.99	7,009	99.49
Invalid/blank votes		69	1.01	36	0.51
Total votes		6,837	100.00	7,045	100.00
Registered voters/turnout		7,412	92.24	7,412	95.05
Liberal gain					
Source: Kiesraad, Huygens Instituut (1, 2)

1909 general election: Zierikzee
Candidate	Party	Votes	%
Rudolf Patijn	Lib	3,944	51.73
H.C. Vegtel	AR	3,402	44.62
Floor Wibaut	SDAP	278	3.65
Total		7,624	100.00
Valid votes		7,624	99.18
Invalid/blank votes		63	0.82
Total votes		7,687	100.00
Registered voters/turnout		8,284	92.79
Liberal hold			
Source: Kiesraad, Huygens Instituut

=== Elections in the 1910s ===
1913 general election: Zierikzee
Candidate	Party	Votes	%
Rudolf Patijn	Lib	4,361	53.65
H.C. Hogerzeil	AR	3,244	39.91
H.A. Koomans	SDAP	524	6.45
Total		8,129	100.00
Valid votes		8,129	99.04
Invalid/blank votes		79	0.96
Total votes		8,208	100.00
Registered voters/turnout		8,974	91.46
Liberal hold			
Source: Kiesraad, Huygens Instituut

1917 general election: Zierikzee
Candidate	Party	Votes	%
Rudolf Patijn	Lib		
Total			
Registered voters/turnout		9,399	–
Liberal hold			
Source: Kiesraad, Huygens Instituut
