= Boreel baronets =

Dutch noble family

Boreel family
- noble family
- Dutch coat of arms of the Boreel family displaying a Jonkheer's coronet. The English coat of arms is augmented with the Arms of Ulster on an inescutcheon.
- Country: Netherlands
- Founded: 15th century
- Founder: Ruffin Bourell
- Titles: Baron, Baronet, Jonkheer

Boreel (Dutch pronunciation: [boːˈreːl]) is a well-known Dutch noble family, who also hold an English baronetcy. The family originally comes from the County of Flanders.

== History ==
The family's recorded lineage begins with Ruffin Bourell or Rufino Borelli who lived in Lille in 1401. A trader of Italian descent, he became one of the first bankers in Ghent. He lived near St Bavo's Church (later St Bavo's Cathedral) in a stone house that still exists. Bourell died in 1443 and was buried with his wife Peronne the Senecael in the crypt of that church. Pieter Boreel (1524–1568), a merchant of oil and candles, fled to Norwich (Norfolk, England) in 1567 after participating in the Iconoclastic Fury. He tried in vain to buy his freedom of religion for three million guilders from the Governor of the Netherlands, Fernando Álvarez de Toledo, 3rd Duke of Alba. After Middelburg chose the side of William I, Prince of Orange, the Boreel family returned.

Sir Jacob Boreel (1552–1636) was mayor of Middelburg and one of the founders of the Dutch East India Company (VOC). He was knighted by King James I of England in 1613. His brother Johan (or Jan?) Boreel (1557–1629) was a negotiator at the Twelve Years' Truce and was a friend of Hugo Grotius. Boreel was married to Maria Gremminck; they were the parents of Pieter and William Boreel. Pieter Boreel was until 1642 a member of the Council of the Indies, a central organ of the Dutch Empire in Asia. He left as a commissioner to Dutch Malacca, and negotiated the extradition of Ceylon from the Portuguese.

Sir William Boreel (1591–1668) was appointed a lawyer for the Dutch East India Company in 1618. Since the conflicts between the British East India Company and the Dutch East India Company threatened to poison the good relations between the States General of the Netherlands and the English king James I, the two companies concluded a Treaty of Defence in London in 1619, in which the companies promised to work together and to share their trading posts peacefully. For this, he was knighted by King James I in 1622. He was Pensionary of Amsterdam from 1627 to 1649. In 1643/44, he again travelled to England, together with Johan van Reede van Renswouden, in an attempt to mediate in the First English Civil War. In 1644, he was named Baron of Vreendijk and Vreenhove in Oxford by King Charles I (with the courtesy style and dignity of an English baron, but no seat or vote in the House of Lords). He was Ambassador of the Dutch Republic to Sweden from 1640, to Denmark, and to England from 1644. After that, he served as Dutch Ambassador to France from 1649 until the end of his life. He also acquired the heerlijkheid (nobility) with the title Lord of Duynbeke, Westhoven, Steeland and Perenboom (in Dutch: Heer van Duynbeke, Westhoven, Steeland en Perenboom).

On 21 March 1645, the Boreel Baronetcy, of Amsterdam in the Netherlands, in the Baronetage of England, was created for Sir William Boreel by King Charles I of England. The baronetcy descended in the direct line until the death of his grandson, the third Baronet, in 1710. The late Baronet died unmarried and was succeeded by his younger brother, the fourth Baronet. He died without male issue and was succeeded by his first cousin, the fifth Baronet. He was the son of James Boreel, younger son of the first Baronet. He died childless and was succeeded by his nephew, the sixth Baronet. He was the son of James Boreel, younger brother of the fifth Baronet. He never married and was succeeded by his first cousin once removed, the seventh Baronet. He acquired the heerlijkheid Hogelanden with the title Lord of Hogelanden (in Dutch: Heer van Hogelanden). He was the grandson of John Hieronymous Boreel, younger brother of the fifth Baronet. His son Jhr. Sir Jacob Boreel, the eighth Baronet (1768–1821), was raised in 1814 into the Dutch nobility as Jonkheer by Sovereign Prince William I of the Netherlands (king in 1815); the same thing happened for his two brothers, Lieutenant-General Jhr. Willem François Boreel (1775–1851) in 1816 and Jhr. Lucas Boreel (1780–1854) in 1821. The baronetcy descended from father to son until the death of his grandson, the tenth Baronet, in 1937.

He died without male issue and was succeeded by his second cousin once removed, the eleventh Baronet. He was the great-grandson of Jhr. Willem François Boreel, one of the younger sons of the seventh Baronet. He died unmarried and was succeeded by his younger brother, the twelfth Baronet. This line of the family failed on the death of the latter's son, the thirteenth Baronet, who died without male issue in 2001. The late Baronet was succeeded by his distant relative (his fourth cousin once removed), Jhr. Sir Stephan Gerard Boreel (born 1945), the fourteenth Baronet and (as of 2018) present holder of the title. He is the great-great-great-grandson of Jhr. Lucas Boreel, the youngest son of the seventh Baronet. The fourteenth Baronet has one son.

== Boreel baronets, of Amsterdam (1645–present) ==
- Sir William Boreel, 1st Baronet, Lord of Duynbeke, Westhoven, Steeland and Perenboom (1591–1668)
- Sir John Boreel, 2nd Baronet, Lord of Duynbeke, Westhoven, Steeland and Perenboom (1627–1691)
- Sir William Boreel, 3rd Baronet, Lord of Duynbeke, Westhoven, Steeland and Perenboom (1672–1710)
- Sir Adrian Boreel, 4th Baronet, Lord of Duynbeke, Westhoven, Steeland and Perenboom (1674–1723)
- Sir Balthasar Boreel, 5th Baronet (1673–1744)
- Sir William Boreel, 6th Baronet (1712–1787)
- Sir William Boreel, 7th Baronet, Lord of Hogelanden (1744–1796)

Since 1814, the Boreel baronets – and their family, belong also to the Dutch untitled nobility (as "Jonkheer").

- Jonkheer Sir Jacob Boreel, 8th Baronet, Lord of Hogelanden (1768–1821)
- Jonkheer Sir William Boreel (van Hogelanden), 9th Baronet (1800–1883)
- Jonkheer Sir Jacob William Gustavus Boreel (van Hogelanden), 10th Baronet (1852–1937)
- Jonkheer Sir Francois William Robert Boreel (van Hogelanden), 11th Baronet (1882–1941)
- Jonkheer Sir Alfred Boreel (van Hogelanden), 12th Baronet (1883–1964)
- Jonkheer Sir Francis David Boreel (van Hogelanden), 13th Baronet (1926–2001)
- Jonkheer Sir Stephan Gerard Boreel (van Hogelanden), 14th Baronet (born 1945)
