= Paul Hentzner =

German lawyer

- Born: 29 January 1558; Crossen, Brandenburg
- Died: 1 January 1623 (aged 64)

Paul Hentzner (29 January 1558 – 1 January 1623) was a German lawyer who published an account of his travels in England during the late Elizabethan era.

Hentzner was born in Crossen, in the Margraviate of Brandenburg. In 1596, he became tutor to a young Silesian nobleman, and the following year they set out on a three-year tour of Switzerland, France, England, and Italy. In 1612, Hentzner published an account of his travels in Latin as Itinerarium Germaniae, Galliae, Angliae, Italiae, cum Indice Locorum, Rerum atque Verborum.

The portion of the work concerning England was later translated into English by Richard Bentley, and published by Horace Walpole. In 1797, Hentzner's Travels in England was published with Sir Robert Naunton's Fragmenta Regalia in one volume, with notes by the translator and the editor.
