= Johann Heinrich Müntz =

Alsatian-Swiss painter and architect (1727–1798)

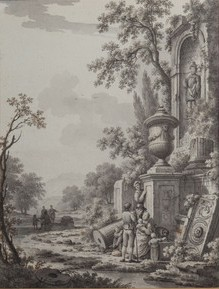
Johann Heinrich Müntz, classical landscape, ink drawing from the 1770s

Johann Heinrich Müntz (1727–1798) was an Alsatian-Swiss painter and architect, known when working in England as John Henry Muntz. He was in England for seven years, and at the heart of a group trying to adapt the rococo to architecture and interior design. He has been seen as a pioneer of the Gothic Revival.

== Early life ==
Müntz was born in Mulhouse, then geographically part of Alsace but politically in the Old Swiss Confederacy. He travelled, and served in the French army. He was a captain of his Swiss regiment, spent time in Spain with it, and drew examples of the Gothic style there.

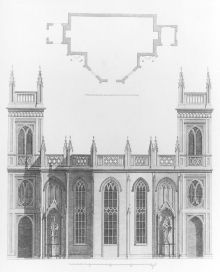
"Gothic Cathedral" at Kew, designed by Johann Heinrich Müntz

The War of the Austrian Succession ended in 1748. After the disbandment of his regiment Müntz applied to the Tribu des Maréchaux, an artisan group in Mulhouse, and gaining entry as a painter, he went to Rome in 1751, and worked for about two years copying antique vases. He then was on the island of Jersey in 1754, and encountered there Richard Bentley. Bentley brought him to England, and introduced him by letter to Horace Walpole.

== In England ==
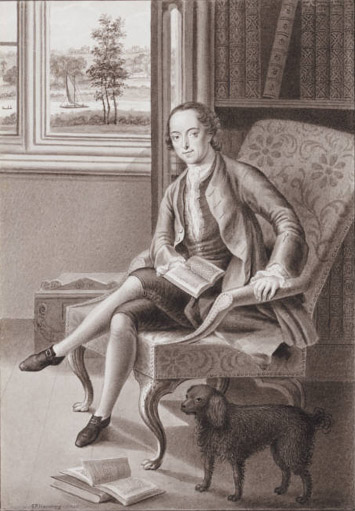
Horace Walpole in the Library at Strawberry Hill House, 1756 drawing by Johann Heinrich Müntz

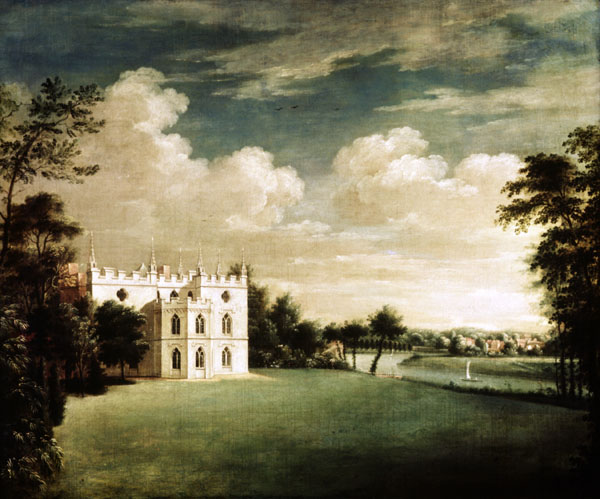
Johann Heinrich Müntz, Strawberry Hill House from the south

At Strawberry Hill House, Walpole employed Müntz for four years as a painter and engraver. He also recommended Müntz as a designer to friends including John Chute and George Montagu. Müntz worked for some time at Chute's residence, The Vyne near Basingstoke, where some of his paintings remained. He was at The Vyne in September 1756, when the poet Thomas Gray found it fell to him to nurse Chute through a severe attack of gout.

Walpole and Müntz fell out, and Müntz left Walpole's employ in 1759. One version is that they quarrelled over Müntz's relationship with one of Walpole's servants, whom he subsequently married. Another is simply that Walpole called Müntz a liar. Reeve states that the trouble was a bitter row between Bentley and Müntz. Mowl sets out a theory on a midlife crisis for Walpole who also broke with Bentley, a transition to female friends from a demanding male coterie.

Müntz then went to London. He found work at Kew Gardens, where he designed c.1759 the folly "Gothic Cathedral", made of wood and plaster, difficult to maintain and demolished in 1807. He contributed also to the design of Kew's "Alhambra" (1758), as a collaborator of William Chambers.

In 1761–2 Müntz designed an octagonal "Gothic Room" for Richard Bateman's house at Old Windsor. "Dickie" Bateman—son of the financier Sir James Bateman and brother of William Bateman, 1st Viscount Bateman—was another friend of Walpole, and had begun to modify his home in a "Chinese" style. Müntz was commissioned by James Caulfeild, 4th Viscount Charlemont to make designs for his estate at Marino, Dublin. These plans of 1762 may well never have got off the drawing board, but a small-scale "Gothic Room" was in a tower there in 1763, seen by the Countess of Northumberland.

== Later life ==
In 1763 Müntz went to Holland, setting off to paint landscapes of Greece and Jerusalem. He worked in Weesp and Muiden as a porcelain painter and a metallurgist for Benjamin Veitel Ephraim, till around 1777. He cooperated with Johann Georg Michael in the design of an English garden at Beeckestijn. In the 1780s he was in Poland, and built a villa there for Stanisław Poniatowski.

Müntz died in Kassel in 1798.

== Works ==
Müntz painted mainly Italian landscapes in a severe manner: there were several examples at Strawberry Hill. He also copied pictures for Walpole. With Walpole he practised the art of encaustic painting, as revived by Anne Claude de Caylus.

In 1760 Müntz published Encaustic, or Count Caylus's Method of Painting in the Manner of the Ancients, with an etching on the title-page by himself. In 1762 he exhibited a painting in encaustic at the Society of Artists, and again in 1763. Also in 1760 Muntz set out a prospectus for a course on Gothic architecture. It came to nothing, but the manuscript survived in papers of James Essex, and went to the British Museum.

Müntz in 1772 compiled a work about drawings on ancient vases. It was based on work he had done in Rome, in 1751. It remained in manuscript into the 19th century. Such manuscript was in the collection of Sir Thomas Phillipps; and later in the catalogue of Henry George Bohn, with a description of Müntz's system of ovals, and a version in Dutch. There was also such a manuscript in the South Kensington Art Library.
