= Richard Bentley (writer) =

English writer and designer

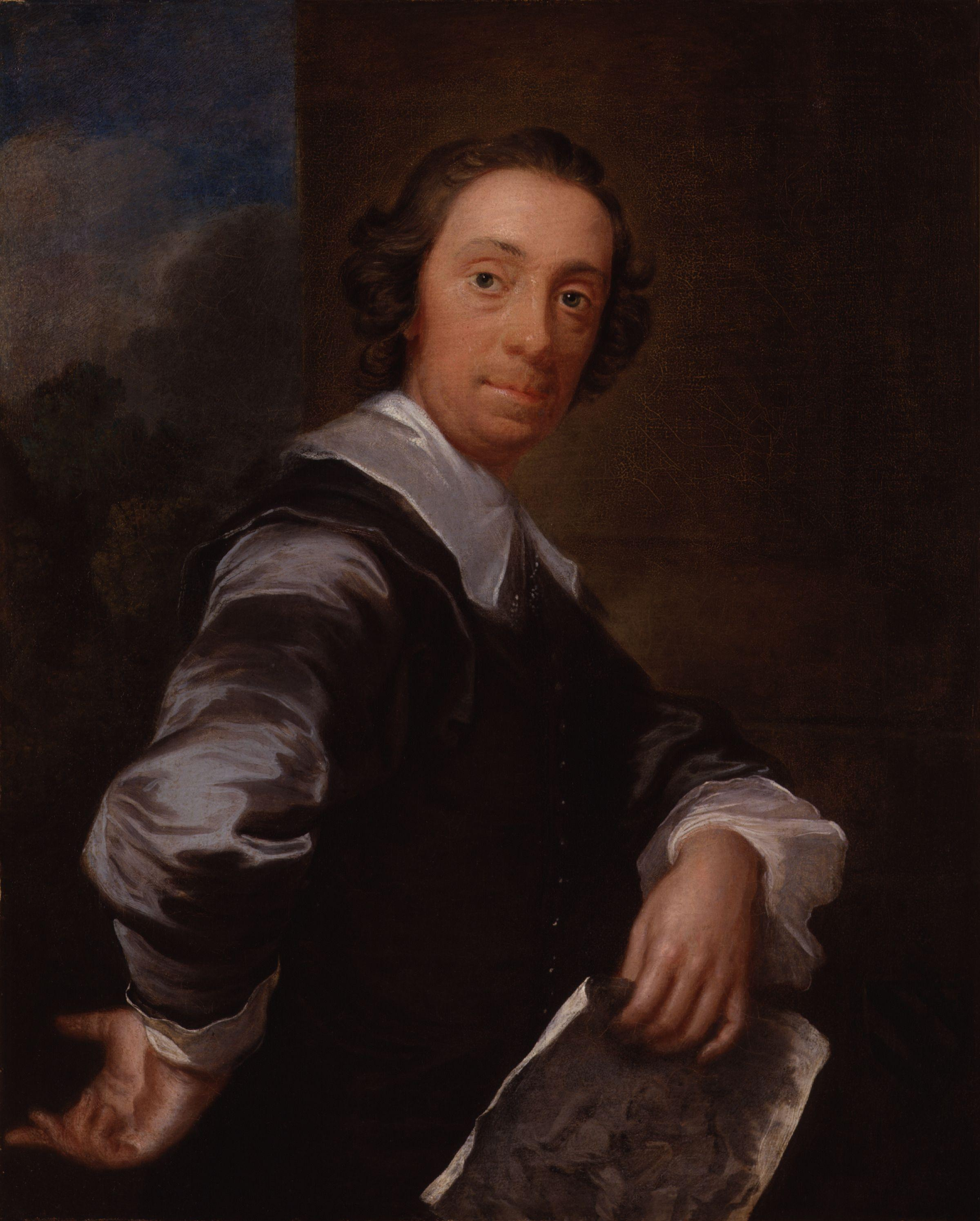
1753 portrait of Bentley by John Giles Eccardt

Richard Bentley (c. 1708 – c. 1782) was an English writer and designer who was friends with Thomas Gray and Horace Walpole.

== Life ==
The son of Richard Bentley, Master of Trinity College, Cambridge, he was admitted to the college at age 10. He entered the Middle Temple in 1720. His father's influence saw him made fellow of Trinity in 1728; but he never settled to a career, endured financial troubles, and spent time in France and Jersey.

During the 1750s Bentley developed significant friendships, with Horace Walpole and Thomas Gray; in Jersey in 1754 he met also Johann Heinrich Müntz. He fell out with Walpole in 1761.

== Works ==
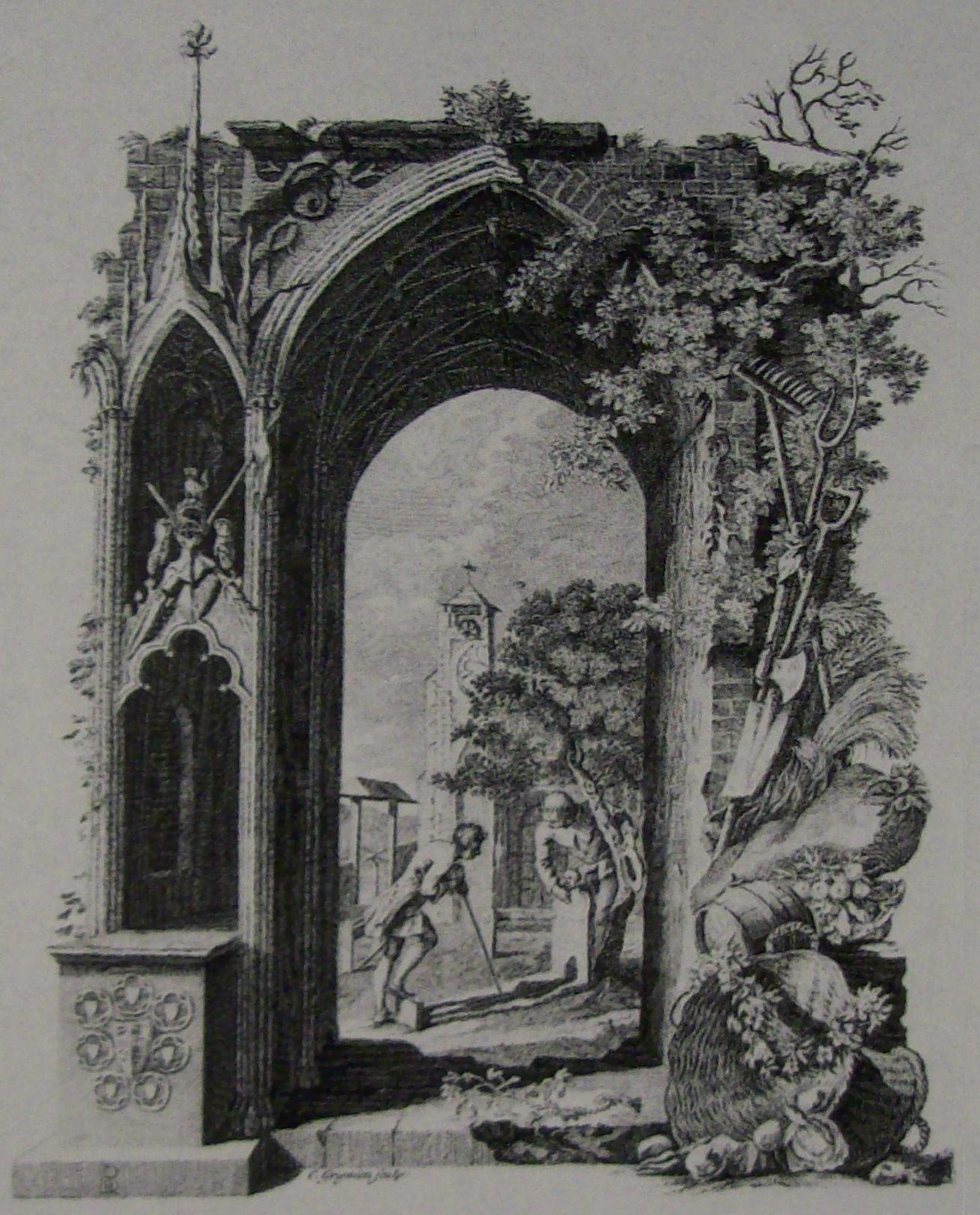
Richard Bentley, 1753 design for Thomas Gray's Elegy in a Country Churchyard

Bentley made drawings for Gray's poems, and some were published in 1753, as Designs by Mr. Bentley, for Six Poems by Mr. T. Gray. It was influenced by French style, a rococo work showing also Gothic aspects and traces of chinoiserie. He was one of Walpole's group of advisers, with John Chute and Thomas Pitt, who steered the design for Strawberry Hill, Pitt being Bentley's successor on the "Committee of Taste" when he fell out of favour. The poem illustrations have been thought connected with the style of Jean Bérain; Bentley's subsequent architectural designs were eclectic.

Around 1761 Bentley turned playwright. His comedy The Wishes, or Harlequin's Mouth opened was acted at Drury Lane for three nights (27, 28, 30 July 1761), and at Covent Garden, 3 October 1761. It was written to ridicule the construction of Ancient Greek drama, especially the three unities and moralisings of the chorus: the chorus in the Wishes are informed that a madman, a torch in his hand, is just on the point of setting fire to a powder magazine, and commence in strophe and antistrophe to lament their own condition, proceeding to exclaim against the thrice-unhappy madman and against the six-times unhappy fate of themselves thus exposed to a madman's fury. His tragedy Philodamus (printed 1767), with its scenes of courtship, paternal vigilance, and spousal preparations, is said to have convulsed the house with laughter. A posthumous comedy of his, The Prophet, was acted for a few nights in 1788.

Among Bentley's other writings were Patriotism, a Mock Heroic in five cantos, London, 1763; and A Letter to the Right Hon. C. F. Fox, 1793. He also translated the travels of Paul Hentzner; and verse for tomb inscription by Elizabeth Russell, Lady Russell.

== Notes ==
Attribution

This article incorporates text from a publication now in the public domain: Wroth, Warwick William (1885). "Bentley, Richard (1708-1782)". In Stephen, Leslie (ed.). Dictionary of National Biography. Vol. 4. London: Smith, Elder & Co. pp. 314–316.
