= Beeckestijn =

Coordinates: 52°27′9″N 4°39′2″E

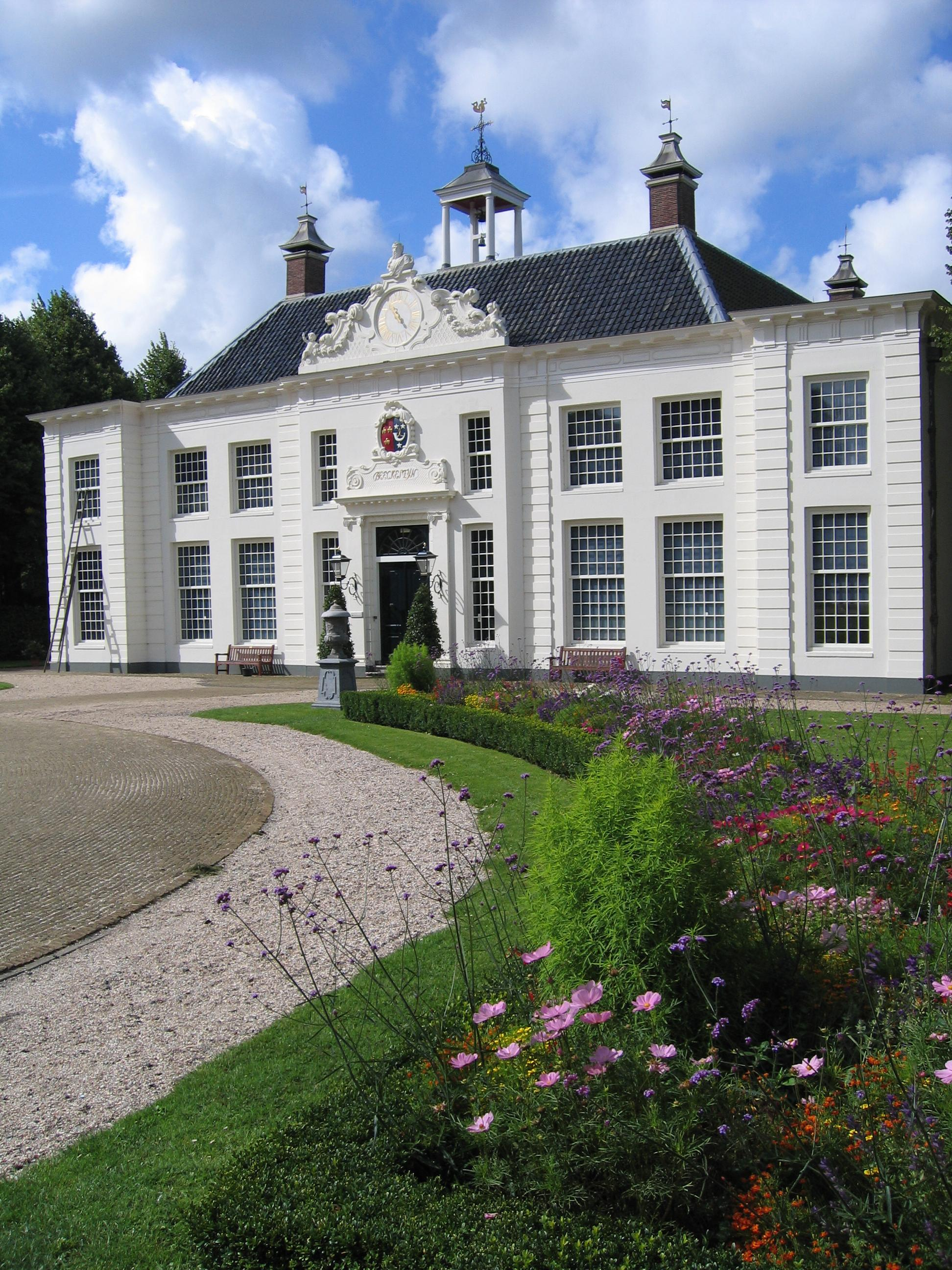
The main building of Beeckestijn.

Beeckestijn is a historical buitenplaats (summer house) dating from the 18th century in a park by the same name in Velsen-Zuid, Netherlands.

== History ==
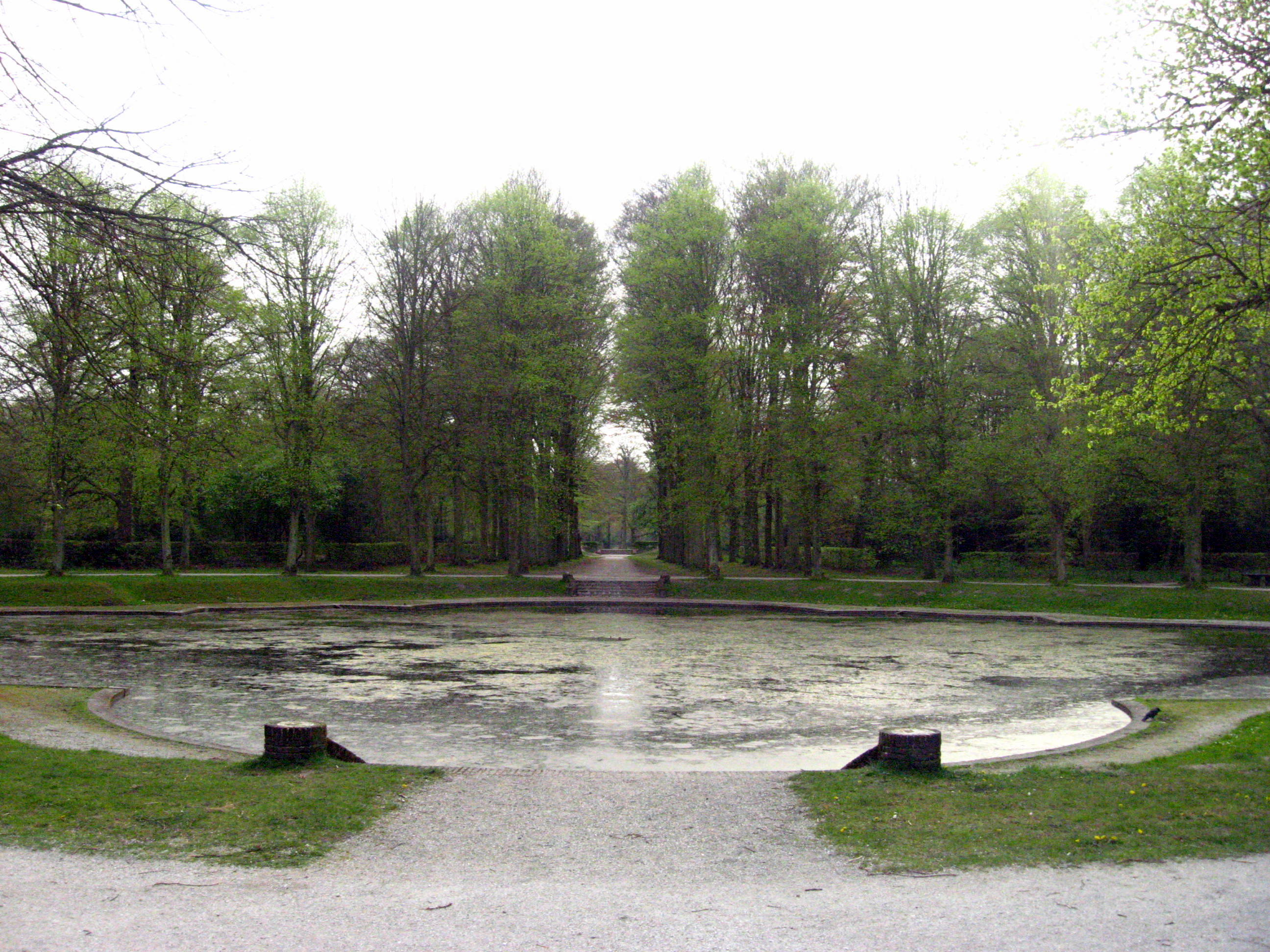
The park. Under the pond is a bunker from the Atlantikwall.

The Beeckestijn site was a buitenplaats in the 15th and 16th centuries before the current English-style garden was designed in the 18th century. The house and the accompanying gardens are listed for varying reasons in the National register of monuments. The original design of the current garden plan from 1772 was preserved in an engraving by the landscape designer Johann Georg Michael (1738-1800), who also designed the neighboring park Waterland. He was assisted by the painter and designer Johann Heinrich Müntz. They were commissioned by the owner Jacob Boreel who had visited England and wished for a garden in the style of Stowe, Kewe Gardens and Wimpole. The gardens were partially redesigned in 1936 by the landscape designer Leonard Springer (1855-1940). Throughout the park are three bunkers from World War II that were sunk after the war by pumping the sand beneath them away. One of these bunkers is below the shell pond near the rear of the house.

The house had various owners until being bought by the Trip family in the 17th century. Jan Trip the younger expanded the house to its present state in 1716-1721. The main building seen today has a sculpture on the facade and some stuccos within by Ignatius van Logteren (1685-1732). The house was occupied as a residence until 1924 when it fell into disuse. In 1939 it was used by a Dutch regiment who caused a lot of damage, and in 1941 it was occupied by German infantry. In 1942 the three Atlantikwall bunkers were built in the garden. After the war the house was occupied by Canadians before becoming the property of Jonkvrouwe Agnes Cremer-Boreel who sold it to Velsen. The restoration was completed in 1969 and the property opened as a museum, with a yearly garden festival and a yearly pop festival taking place there.

In 2006 the museum with rooms in the style of the owner Jacob Boreel was closed. The property now belongs to the Vereniging Hendrick de Keyser, which restores and manages other heritage sites in the area. Beeckestijn is due to reopen as a museum of landscape, due to its importance as a relic of Dutch garden history, as well as its role in the nearby water management history (the house was originally on the Wijkermeer).
