= Frederik van Rappard =

Dutch politician

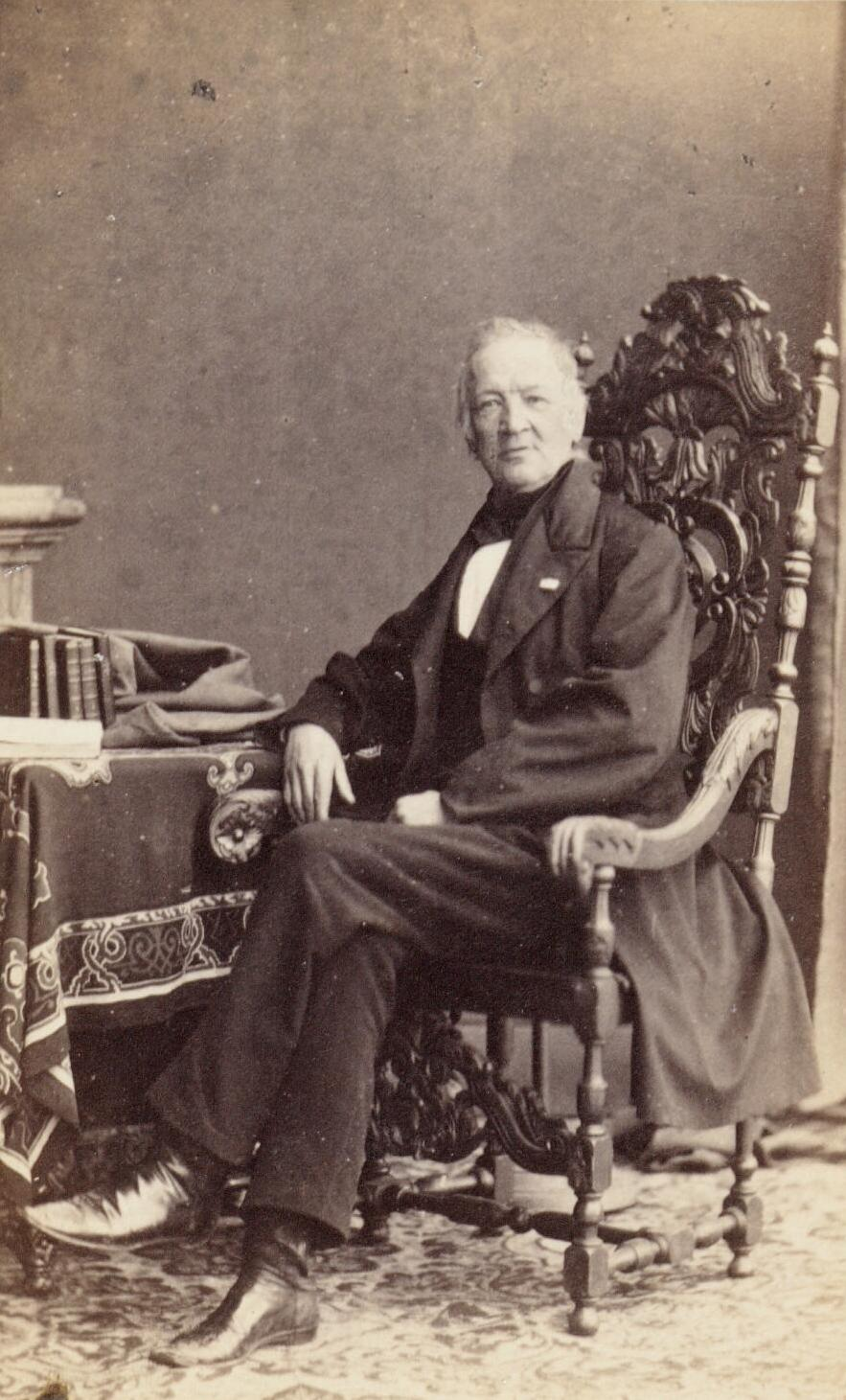
W.L.F.Ch. van Rappard

Willem Louis Frederik Christiaan ridder van Rappard (3 May 1798 – 9 June 1862) was a Dutch conservative politician who served as a member of the House of Representatives from 1833 to 1844, and again from 1853 to 1857, and as Minister of Finance in 1848.

== Biography ==
Van Rappard was born in Arnhem on 3 May 1798 to Hendrik Anthon van Rappard and Elisabeth Theodora Sibilla Louisa op ten Noort. He attended his hometown's Latin school from 1814 to 1816, and subsequently studied humanities and law at the University of Groningen from September 1816 until April 1818. He spent the summer of 1818 travelling through Germany with a number of friends. He enrolled in Roman and contemporary law at Leiden University on 17 September 1819, and received his doctorate there on 24 June 1820 with a dissertation entitled De auctoritate et usu disceptationum et orationum, quae occasione conficiendi commendandique codicis civilis Francici sunt habitae, (vulgo discussions et motifs), in interpretatione legis.

After his graduation, Van Rappard started a legal career, working as a lawyer in The Hague from 1820, as deputy public prosecutor at the court of first instance at Zutphen from December 1822, and as public prosecutor at the same court from 1829. He was appointed president of the Provincial Court of Appeal in Arnhem on 1 October 1838, and served in this capacity until 1 January 1848. Aside from his legal career, he was also a landowner in Laren, Gelderland, Steenderen and Gendt, among others. He was elevated to nobility and received the predicate jonkheer on 8 January 1821, thereby becoming a member of the ridderschap of Gelderland.

Van Rappard's political career began on 7 July 1829, when he was elected to the Provincial Council of Gelderland by the ridderschap. In 1833, the Provincial Council elected him to the House of Representatives, and he took office on 22 October of that year. In the House, he frequently took the floor and spoke on a wide range of subjects, including the Dutch East Indies, education, justice, finance and the interior. He received the noble title ridder on 14 December 1842. Two years later, on 21 October 1844, he was appointed to the Senate, and served there until 13 February 1849. He also briefly served as Minister of Finance from 1 January until 25 March 1848.

After his ministership, Van Rappard briefly returned to the Provincial Council of Gelderland between July and August 1849, and resumed his role as president of the Provincial Court of Appeal in Arnhem on 1 September 1849. He was also elected to the municipal council of Laren in 1851. He contested the 1853 general election in several districts and defeated the liberal candidate A.W. Engelen in the district of Amersfoort, and he returned to the House on 14 June 1853. He resigned from the House on 21 September 1857 due to his old age, but served as president of the Court of Appeal until his death in Laren on 9 June 1862.
