= Willem Boreel =

Dutch diplomat (1591–1668)

- Born: 2 March 1591; Middelburg, Zeeland
- Died: 29 September 1668 (aged 77); Paris
- Occupation: Diplomat
- Family: Boreel

Sir Willem Boreel, 1st Baronet (2 March 1591 – 29 September 1668) was a Dutch diplomat.

== Biography ==
Willem Boreel was born in Middelburg, Zeeland on 2 March 1591 into the Boreel baronets, the son of Jacob Boreel (1552–1636), burgomaster of Bergen-op-Zoom. Adam Boreel and the jurist Abraham Boreel were brothers; Johan Boreel was a half-brother. From 1618 Boreel worked for the Dutch East India Company as a lawyer, and was part of a mission to resolve the Dutch and British commercial rivalry in the East Indies by a treaty. He was knighted by James I of England.

Boreel became Baron of Vreendijk and Vreenhove. From 1627 to 1649 he was Pensionary of Amsterdam. During that period he travelled to England, with Johan van Reede van Renswouden, in an attempt to mediate in the First English Civil War. Then, from 1650, until his death in Paris on 29 September 1668 he served as Ambassador of the Dutch Republic to France.

== Telescope investigation ==
In 1655, Boreel assisted in the controversy over trying to figure out who invented the telescope. He had a local magistrate in Middelburg in the Netherlands follow up on his recollection of a spectacle maker who told Boreel in 1610 about inventing the telescope. The magistrate was contacted by a then unknown claimant, Middelburg spectacle maker Johannes Zachariassen, who testified that his father, Zacharias Janssen invented the telescope and the microscope as early as 1590. This testimony seemed to convincing to Boreel, who now recollected that Zacharias must have been who he remembered. Boreel's conclusion that Zacharias Janssen invented the telescope a little ahead of another spectacle maker, Hans Lippershey, was adopted by Pierre Borel in his 1656 book on the subject.

== Notes ==
Baronetage of England
New creation	Baronet (of Amsterdam); 1645–1668	Succeeded by John Boreel
