= Johan van Reede van Renswouden =

Dutch diplomat and politician

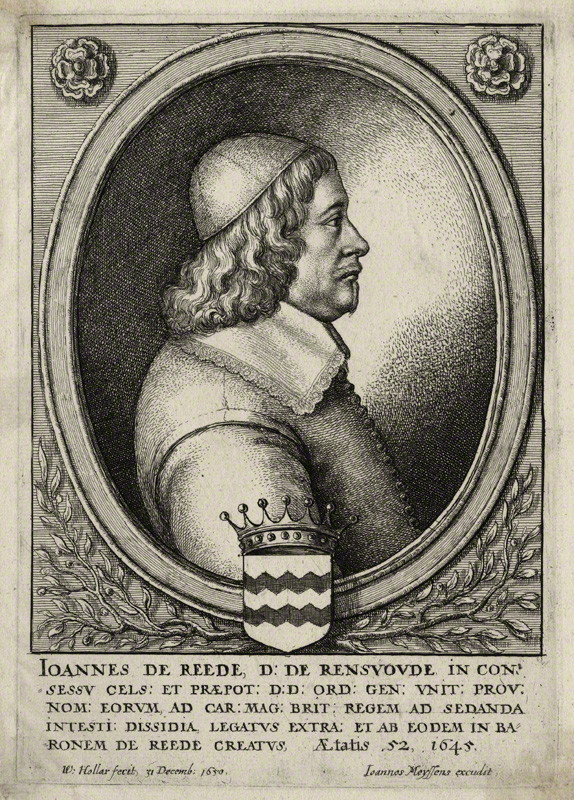
Johan van Reede van Renswouden, 1650 engraving by Wenceslas Hollar

Johan van Reede van Renswoude, known in Britain as John de Reede, 1st Baron Reede (1593, Utrecht – 7 February 1682, The Hague) was a Dutch diplomat and politician.

== Early life ==
The son of Mechteld Peunis van Diest and Gerard/Godard van Reede van Nederhorst (1555-1612), he became, like his father before him, a canon or deacon in Utrecht Cathedral in 1620. In 1623 he acquired the title and lands of Renswoude, and was elected to the States-General of Holland.

== Mission to England ==
In 1644 van Reede was sent with Willem Boreel of Amsterdam as ambassador-extraordinary to England in the attempt to reconcile king and parliament. He visited Charles I at Oxford, and was created Baron Reede on 24 March 1644, with limitation to his heirs male, while Boreel is said to have been made a baronet. Sir Edward Walker, who was with the king at the time, wrote that Baron Reede had only the title and dignity of baron, with no place or voice in parliament.

The House of Commons resented the interference of the ambassadors; and when Boreel and Reede returned to The Hague in May 1645, complaint was made that they had behaved as "interested parties rather than public agents". A medal of van Reede was engraved in England in 1645 by Thomas Simon.

== Later life ==
After his return to Holland van Reede was sent ambassador to Denmark, and from 1652 to 1671 was president of the States of Utrecht, a position which he resumed in 1674. He wrote, on 12 September 1652, to Charles II, at St. Germains, offering his services.

== Family ==
By his wife, Jocamina de Heede (1595-1671), Van Reede had numerous descendants.
