= Willem Anne Schimmelpenninck van der Oye =

Dutch politician

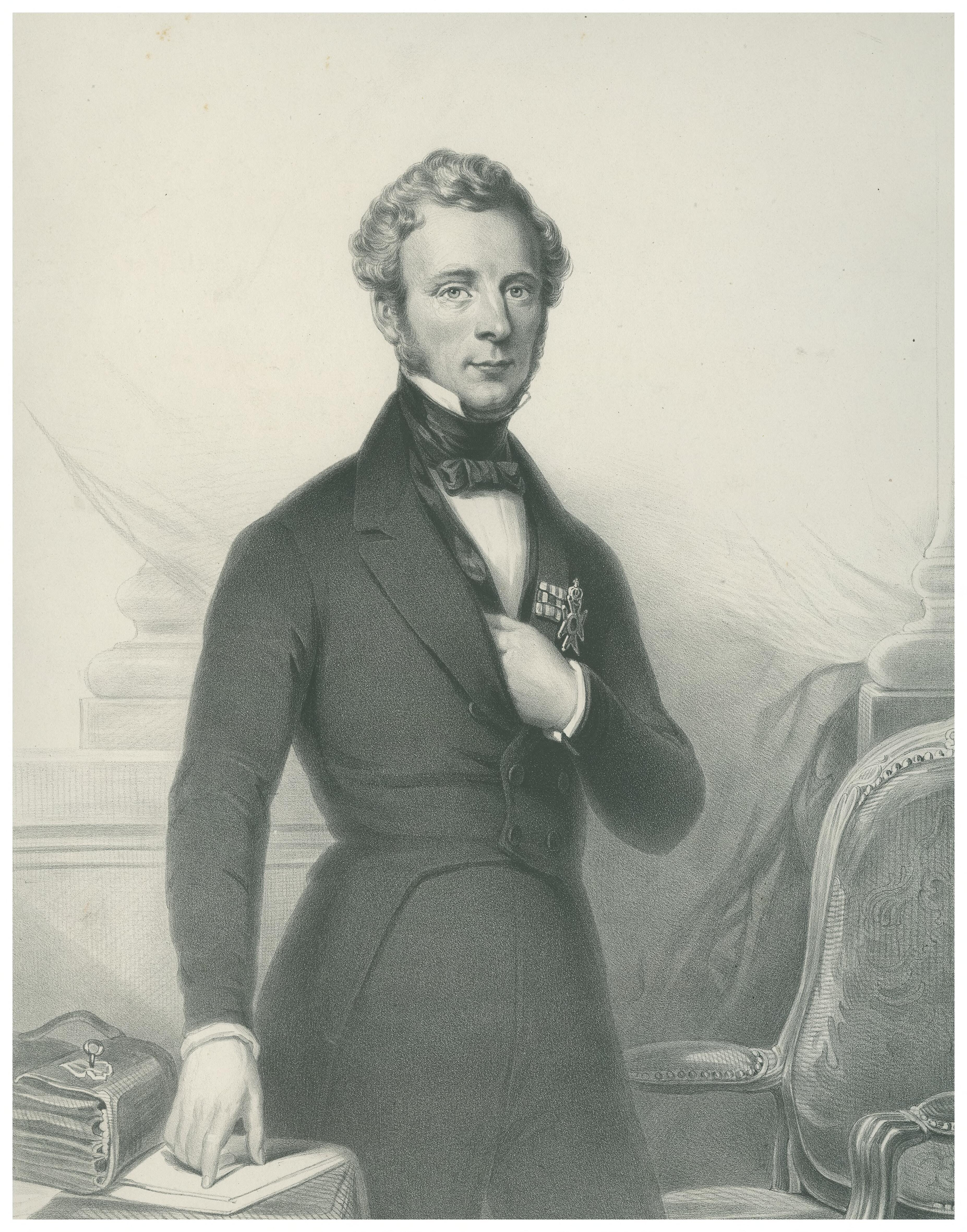
Schimmelpenninck in the early 1840s

Willem Anne, Baron Schimmelpenninck van der Oye (6 January 1800, Doesburg, Gelderland – 12 December 1872, Voorst) was a Dutch politician.

Belonging to a noble family, Schimmelpenninck was a member of the House of Representatives of the Netherlands and Minister of Interior (1841–1846) and Foreign minister (September–October 1843) under King William II, who was a proponent of some reform in government. From 1847 to 1853 he was King's Commissioner of the province of Gelderland.

He was at the time befriended with Thorbecke. However, when Thorbecke had become the first Dutch Prime Minister, he considered Schimmelpenninck as a conservative unfit to remain King's Commissioner and fired him towards the end of his first cabinet (much against the king's wishes). Their friendship ended with that. Afterwards Schimmelpenninck held high functions at the court and returned to the House of Representatives, of which in 1858 he was President. Later he was as confidant of the king a member of the Senate of the Netherlands.

As major of the schutterij, Schimmelpenninck was awarded the Military William Order on 7 February 1844. In 1846 he received the Grand Cross in the Order of the Netherlands Lion. The King of Württemberg awarded him the Grand Cross of the Friedrich Order.

House of Representatives of the Netherlands
Preceded by Constantijn van Panhuys	Member for Zutphen; 1854–1860; With: Justinus van der Brugghen 1853–1854; Willem Hendrik Dullert 1864–1866	Succeeded by Pieter van Bosse
Political offices
Preceded by Jan Karel van Goltstein	Speaker of the House of Representatives; 1858	Succeeded by Gerlach van Reenen
