= Willem Boreel van Hogelanden =

Dutch politician (1800–1883)

Jonkheer Sir Willem Boreel van Hogelanden Bt
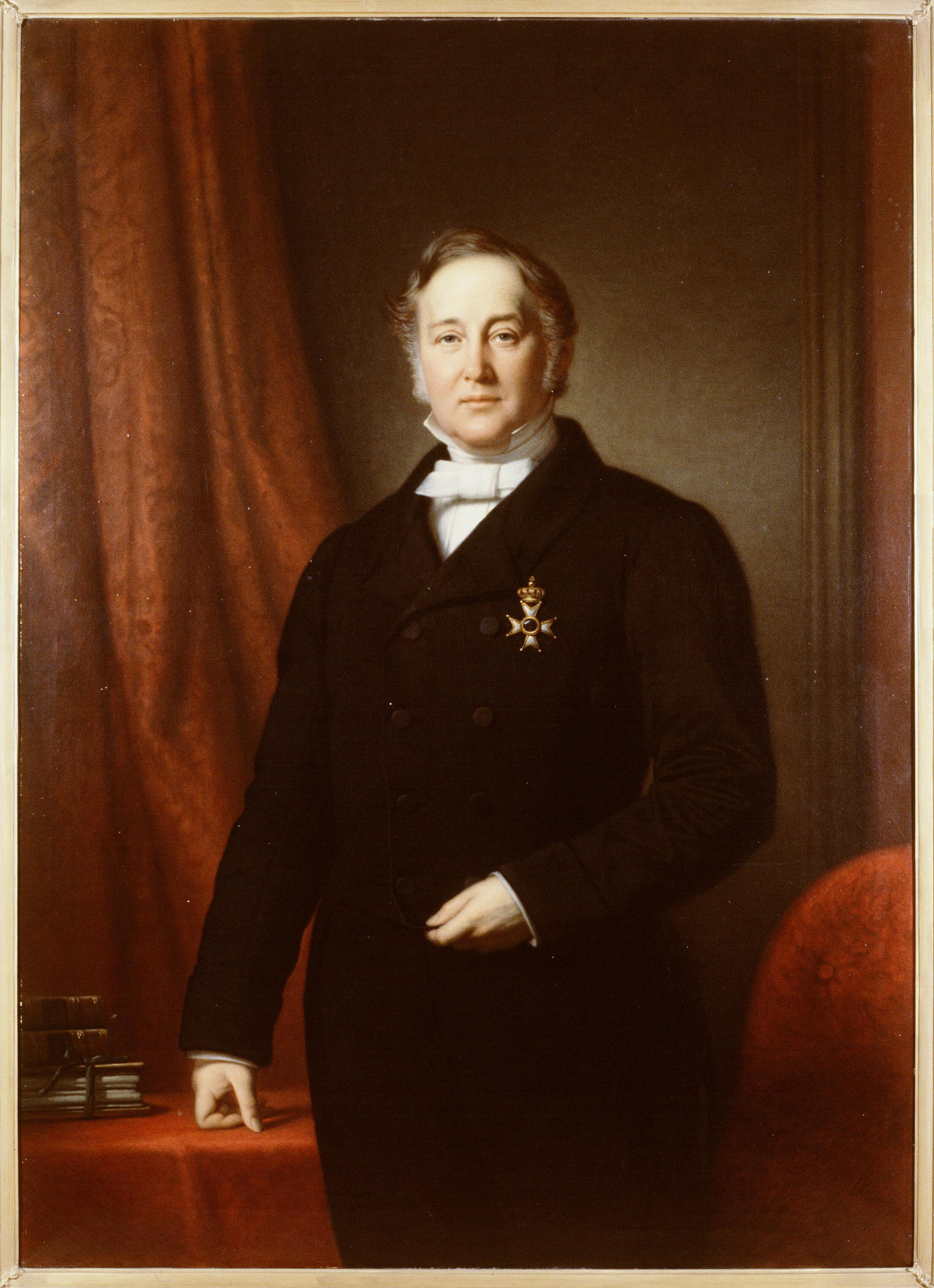
- Portrait by Jan Adam Kruseman, 1860

King's Commissioner of North Holland
- In office 1 October 1855 – 1 May 1860
- Monarch: William III
- Preceded by: Daniël van Ewijck van Oostbroek en de Bilt
- Succeeded by: Herman Röell

Speaker of the House of Representatives
- In office 20 June 1853 – 22 August 1855
- Preceded by: Willem Hendrik Dullert
- Succeeded by: Daniël Théodore Gevers van Endegeest
- In office 21 February 1851 – 17 September 1852
- Preceded by: Albertus Jacobus Duymaer van Twist
- Succeeded by: Willem Hendrik Dullert
- In office 21 October 1847 – 13 February 1849
- Preceded by: George Isaäc Bruce
- Succeeded by: Jan Karel van Goltstein

Personal details
- Born: 24 March 1800 Velsen, Netherlands
- Died: 24 August 1883 (aged 83) Velsen, Netherlands
- Spouse: Margaretha Jacoba Maria Paulina Boreel (m. 1833)
- Education: Leiden University

Jonkheer Sir Willem Boreel, 9th Baronet, Lord of Hogelanden, (24 March 1800 – 24 August 1883) was a Dutch politician who served as Speaker of the House of Representatives thrice in the period between 1847 and 1855, and as King's Commissioner of North Holland from 1855 until 1860.

== Early life and education ==
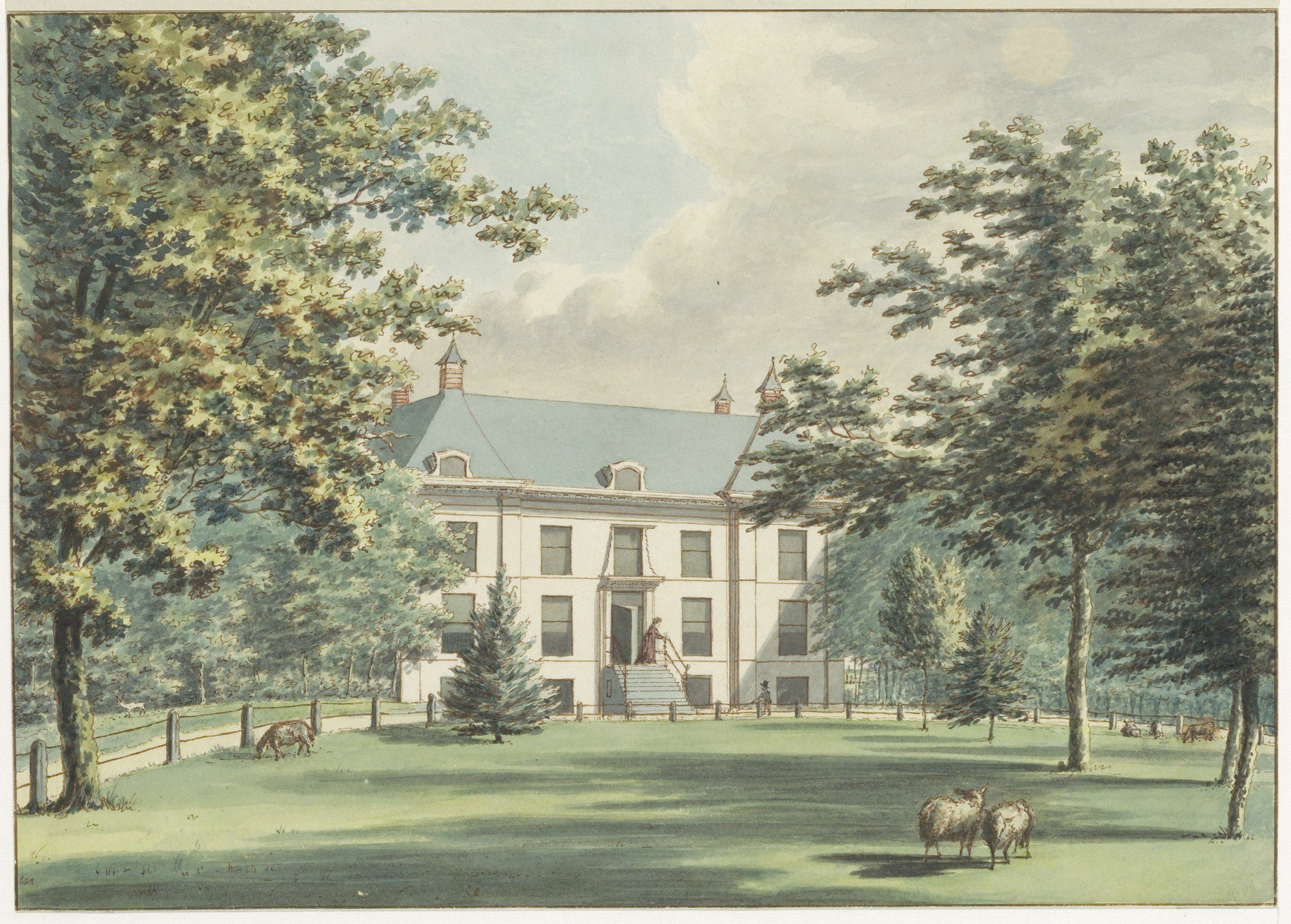
The Waterland estate in Velsen, where Boreel van Hogelanden was born

Boreel van Hogelanden was born on 24 March 1800 in Velsen, to a regent family from the Kennemerland area. His father, Jacob Boreel, served as commissioner and schepen of Amsterdam and as member of the provincial council of Holland, and his mother was Margaretha Johanna Munter. He started studying law at the Athenaeum Illustre of Amsterdam in 1817, registered for literature at Utrecht University in 1819, but ultimately continued studying law at Leiden University, where he attended lectures of Willem Bilderdijk and obtained his doctorate. He inherited the Boreel baronetcy from his father in 1821, and became a member of the Ridderschap of Holland, the college of the province's nobles, in 1824. Boreel van Hogeland started his career in diplomacy, serving as attaché of the Dutch legation to Constantinople from 1822.

== Political career ==
From August to September 1840, he briefly served as extraordinary member of the House of Representatives for the province of Holland, tasked with reviewing the Constitution's first amendment since 1815. In his maiden speech on 31 August, he expressed his opposition to the proposed division of the province of Holland into two provinces. Nevertheless, he voted in favour of the constitutional amendment, considering its other changes as an improvement. On 18 October 1842 he became a regular member of the House, now representing South Holland. In the House, he sided with the moderate or pragmatic liberals; he was neither a supporter nor a principled opponent of the royal government. When a group of liberal members tabled a proposal for constitutional revision in 1844, Boreel van Hogelanden responded sympathetically.

On 21 October 1847, Boreel van Hogelanden was elected Speaker of the House of Representatives. In March 1848, he was summoned by King William II who, pressured by the Revolutions of 1848 elsewhere in Europe, declared to Boreel that he was willing to agree to a constitutional revision, and that he had taken this decision without consulting his ministers. After Boreel relayed this latter point in the House of Representatives, the ministers felt bypassed by the king, and tendered their resignation. In the succeeding period, Boreel opposed the more radical proposals of some members, and sought to build a majority in the House for a moderate reform. However, his efforts were in vain, and the king appointed a constitutional review committee comprising radical liberals, chaired by Johan Rudolph Thorbecke.

After the Constitutional Reform of 1848, which introduced direct elections for the House of Representatives, the 1848 general election was called, and Boreel van Hogelanden was elected in the district of The Hague. Upon the installation of the newly elected parliament on 13 February 1849, he left office as Speaker. The new parliament elected Jan Karel van Goltstein to succeed him. When Thorbecke was tasked with forming a government in 1849, he reluctantly inquired into Boreel's willingness to become minister of Foreign Affairs, but the latter showed no interest in the ministerial post due to his difficult working relation with Thorbecke. As a member of the House of Representatives, Boreel opposed Thorbecke's ministry, in particular foreign minister Herman van Sonsbeeck's policy regarding the Duchy of Limburg and the German Confederation.

In 1851, Speaker of the House Albertus Jacobus Duymaer van Twist was appointed Governor-General of the Dutch East Indies, and Boreel was elected to succeed him. He returned to the office of Speaker on 21 February. He was one of eight members who voted in favour of an amendment, tabled by Guillaume Groen van Prinsterer, which expressed a conservative interpretation of the new Constitution. The vote exemplifies Boreel's increasing conservatism after 1848. Nevertheless, he was no supporter of Groen van Prinsterer, and was reluctant to be considered part of the "conservative party". In October 1852, he lost re-election as Speaker to the Thorbeckean liberal Willem Hendrik Dullert. However, the conservatives made significant inroads in the 1853 general election and Dullert was unseated. Boreel was elected to the Speaker's office a third time in June 1853, and would remain in office until his resignation from the House in 1855.

Boreel van Hogelanden was appointed King's Commissioner of North Holland on 4 August 1855; he took office on 1 October of that year. During his tenure and King's commissioner, he was asked to become minister of Foreign Affairs twice, in 1856 and in 1858, but he declined both times. He remained in office until 1 May 1860, and received the honorary title Minister of State upon his resignation. He also served as a member of the Senate for North Holland from 14 December 1860 until 1 November 1866, when he resigned due to old age. In 1863, he was one of seven members to vote against the secondary education act.

== Family ==
Boreel van Hogelanden married his cousin Margaretha Jacoba Maria Paulina Boreel, Dame du Palais to Queen Sophie, in The Hague on 24 July 1833. The two had nine children, including Jacob Willem Gustaaf Boreel van Hogelanden, later member of the House of Representatives and mayor of Haarlem.

Political offices
Preceded by George Isaäc Bruce	Speaker of the House of Representatives; 1847–1849	Succeeded by Jan Karel van Goltstein
Preceded by Albertus Jacobus Duymaer van Twist	Speaker of the House of Representatives; 1851–1852	Succeeded by Willem Hendrik Dullert
Preceded by Willem Hendrik Dullert	Speaker of the House of Representatives; 1853–1855	Succeeded by Daniël Théodore Gevers van Endegeest
Preceded by Daniël van Ewijck van Oostbroek en de Bilt	King's Commissioner of North Holland; 1855–1860	Succeeded by Herman Röell
Baronetage of England
Preceded by Jacob Boreel	Baronet (of Amsterdam); 1821–1883	Succeeded by J. W. G. Boreel van Hogelanden
