= Westhove Castle =

Castle in the Netherlands

- Kasteel Westhove
- Duinvlietweg 8, Oostkapelle, the Netherlands
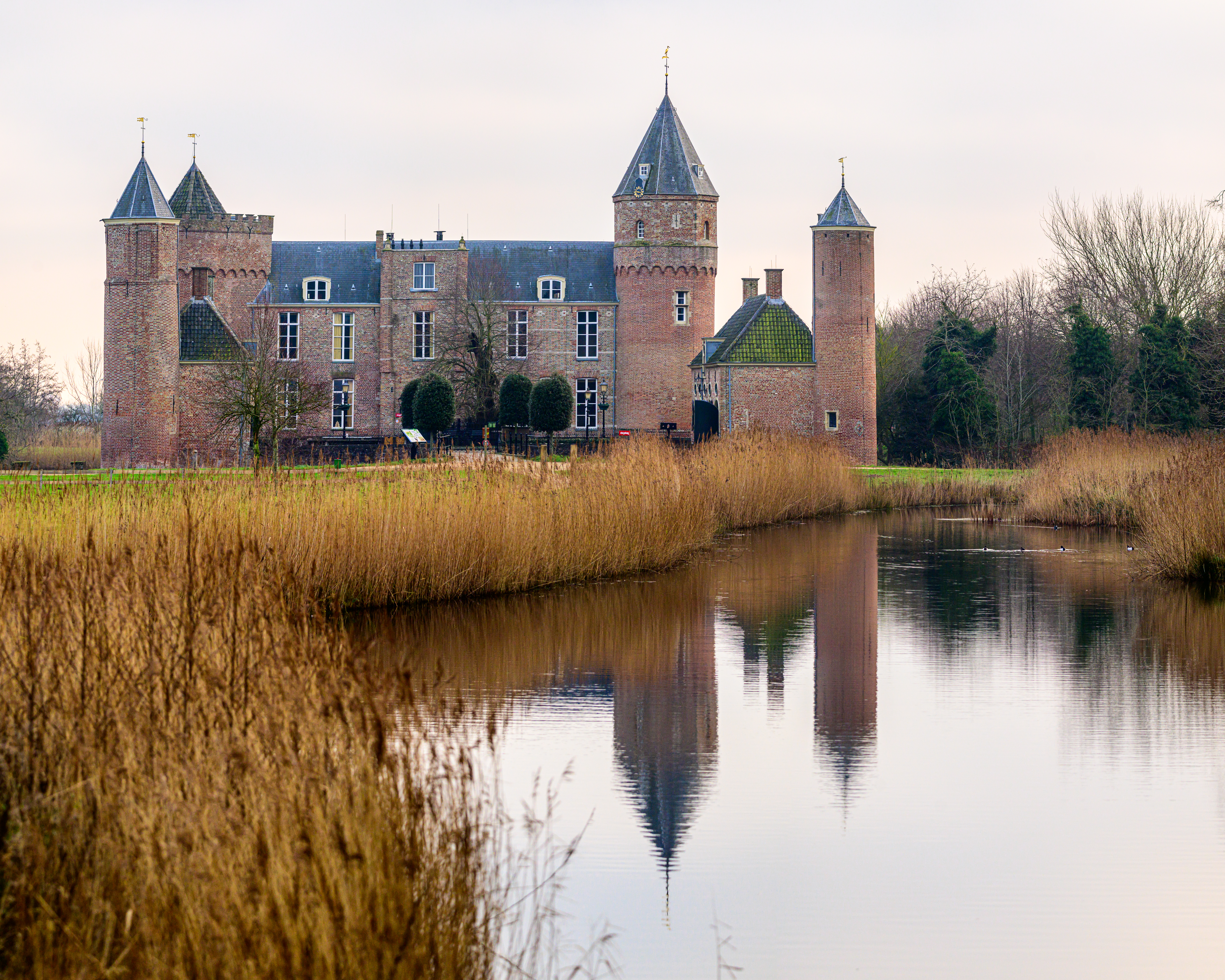
- Westhove Castle

Site information
- Type: Water castle
- Open to the public: Yes

Location
- The Netherlands
- Coordinates: 51.56982°N 3.52174°E

Site history
- Built: 13th century
- Materials: brick

Westhove Castle is a castle on Walcheren, outside Oostkapelle in the province of Zeeland in The Netherlands

== History ==
The castle was mentioned in a charter of 1277 by Count Floris V as being the property of the abbey in Middelburg, but it is not clear how old the castle was then. On 14 April 1401 it was well dedicated to Willem van Beijeren, Count of Oostervant, after which he received it back as immortal legacy. Every time a new abbot came, the name was changed. The abbot was a powerful man in Zeeland, he was also chairman of the States of Zeeland and Walcheren, and the States gathered in the abbey. In 1413 Westhove was leased for 25 years to Philips van Borssele, lord of Cortgene.

Many important people were received at Westhove:

- Count Floris V and Wolfert I van Borselen, lord of Veere concluded the 'Traktaat van Westhove' there on 30 October 1290
- Count and Countess of Charlois in 1460
- Charles the Bold
- Philip of Austria and his wife in 1500
- Their little son, later Emperor Charles V, in 1505 and 1540
- Mary of Hungary, sister of Charles V, in 1547
- Prince William V on 1 July 1786
- Queen Dowager Regent Emma and 13-year-old Queen Wilhelmina on 22 August 1894

In 1559 Middelburg became a bishop's city, after which the bishop ruled Westhove. The Siege of Middelburg followed in 1572. Westhove was occupied by soldiers, who finally had to surrender to Bartholt Entens van Mentheda. This Groningen nobleman was the captain of the watergeuzen who had conquered Dordrecht, after which they moved to Zeeland. He also set fire to the castle on 27 August 1572. Walcheren came under the rule of William of Orange. The church belongings were then sold, the new owner of Westhove became Colonel Heijnrik Balfour, who died two years later. His widow Christina Kant sold it to Pierre de Loiseleur, called de Villiers, counsel to Prince William I. He died in 1590 and was buried in the St Pieterskerk in Middelburg.

Jacob Boreel (grandfather of Jacob Boreel) was the next owner, followed by his son Willem Boreel (1591-1668), ambassador to France. After that, Westhove came into the hands of Johan van Reigersberg, his widow and then their son Jacob. (1725) The weather vane with a heron dates from that period. Rather than leaving the estate to his son Adam Boreel, Jacob bequeathed Westhove to his cousin Jacoba van den Brandde. She was married to Johan Adriaan van de Perre but died childless. They had the orangery built, which now houses the Terra Maris museum.

On 10 March 1799 Jacoba's cousin Wilhelmina Carolina van den Brande inherited the country estate. She married Adriaan Kaspar Cornelis Slicher. They had the large water feature constructed on the north side of the house. Their son Johan Jacob Slicher inherited Westhove. Since he was a member of the Lower House of the States General, he did not visit Zeeland much and sold Westhove.

The next owner was Jacques Phoenix Boddaert (1811-1885), judge in Middelburg . He has done a lot of maintenance on the castle. In 1880 Judge Boddaert sold the country estate to his sister PPC De Bruyn-Boddaert (1814-1905). She gave it a new purpose and in 1899 Westhove became a convalescent home. Her daughter Wilhelmina Johanna de Bruyn (1842-1926) married WA count van Lynden (1836-1913), mayor of Koudekerke who has recovered a lot. When Countess van Lynden died, the castle was converted into 'Stichting Herstellingsoord Westhove'. In 1936 MAJ became Baroness van Till, sister-in-law of Cornelis Eliza Anne van Till, director of the foundation.

== Current State ==
In 2017, the castle is largely freely accessible (except for the attic of the castle). A StayOkay hostel is located in the castle and the associated coach houses. The former orangery houses the Terra Maris museum. Furthermore, a replica of a medieval motte-and-bailey castle has been placed in the garden of the castle.
