= Justinus van der Brugghen =

Dutch politician

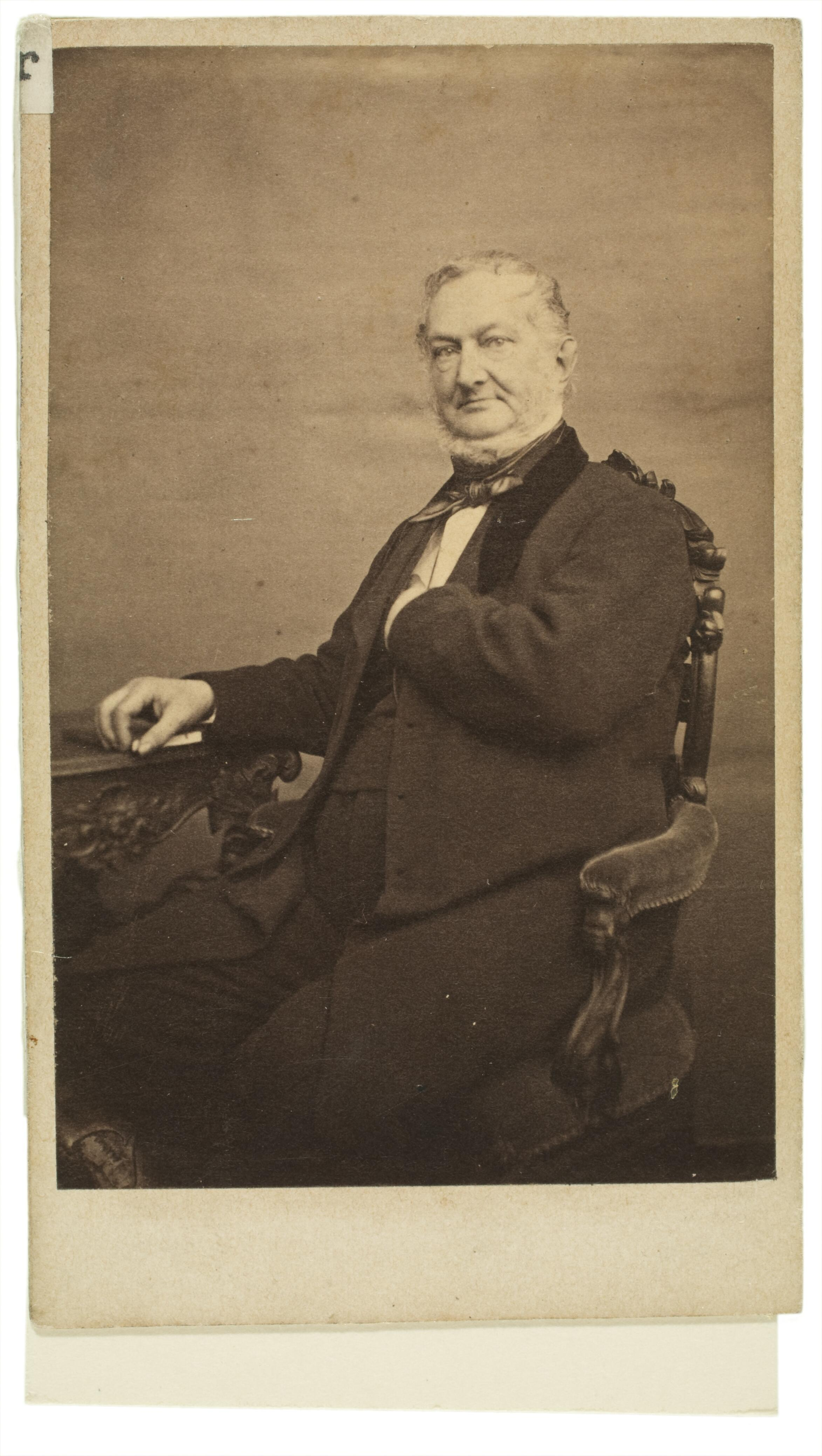

Prime Minister of the Netherlands
- In office 1 July 1856 – 18 March 1858
- Monarch: William III
- Preceded by: Floris Adriaan van Hall
- Succeeded by: Jan Jacob Rochussen

Personal details
- Born: 6 August 1804 Nijmegen, Batavian Commonwealth
- Died: 2 October 1863 (aged 59) Ubbergen, Netherlands
- Spouse: Anna Singendonck

Justinus Jacob Leonard van der Brugghen (6 August 1804, in Nijmegen – 2 October 1863, in Ubbergen) was a Dutch politician who served as Prime Minister of the Netherlands from 1856 to 1858.

House of Representatives of the Netherlands
| Preceded by Willem Hendrik Dullert | Member for Zutphen; 1853–1854; With: Willem Schimmelpenninck van der Oye | Succeeded by Willem Hendrik Dullert |
Political offices
| Preceded by Dirk Donker Curtius | Minister of Justice; 1856–1856 | Succeeded by Cornelis Hendrik Boudewijn Boot |
