= Jan Karel van Goltstein =

Dutch lawyer and politician (1794–1872)

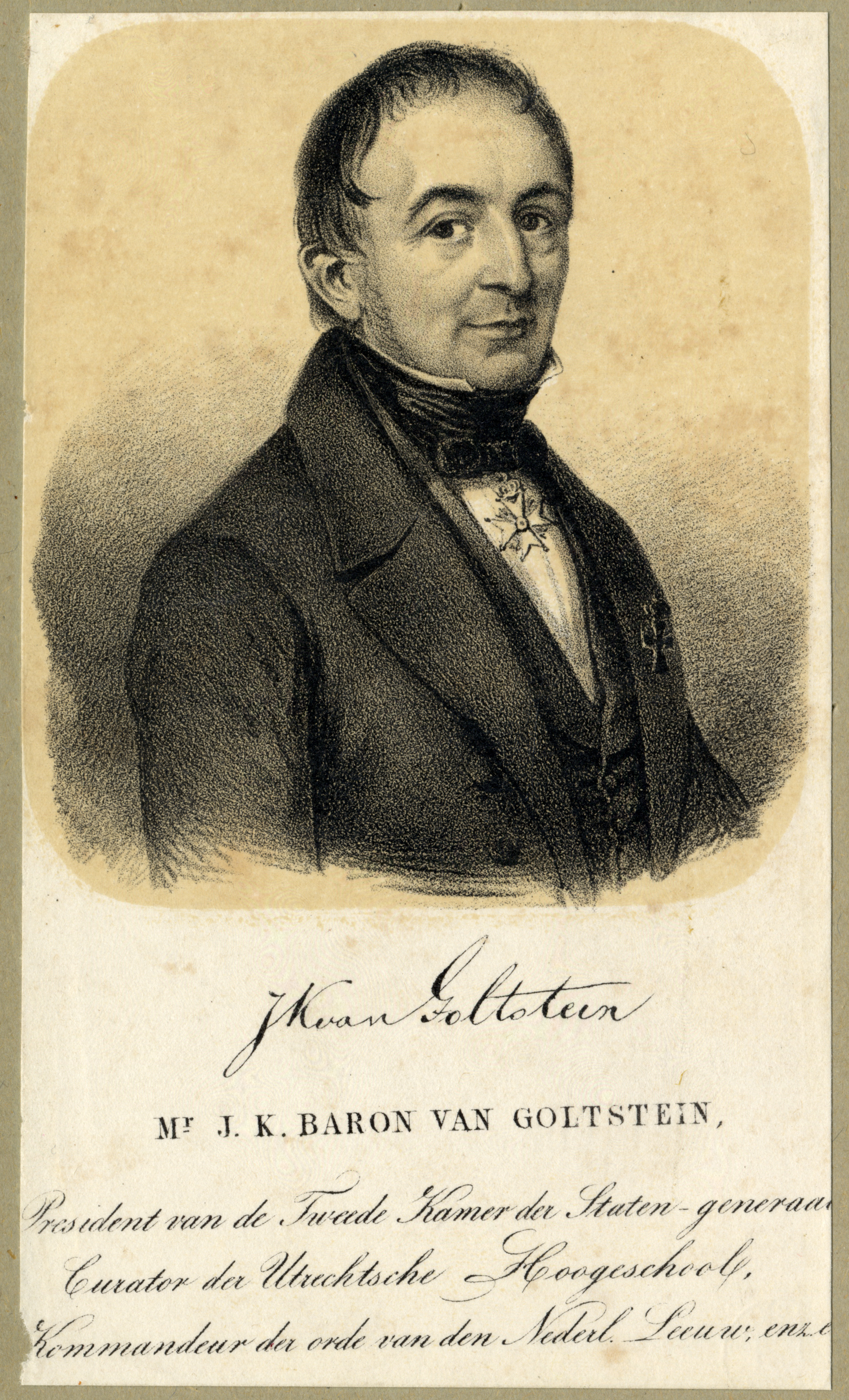

Jan Karel, Baron van Goltstein (30 May 1794, Arnhem – 17 February 1872, The Hague) was a Dutch lawyer and independent politician. He became a member of the House of Representatives of the Netherlands in 1840. He was president of the House of Representatives of the Netherlands twice in the periods 19 February 1849 - 20 August 1850 and 19 September 1856 - 11 March 1858. From 5 March 1858 to 23 February 1860 he was the foreign minister in the Rochussen cabinet. Afterwards he was a member of the House of Representatives of the Netherlands for another 9 years and a member of the senate for 1.5 years.

== Sources ==
- http://www.parlement.com/9291000/biof/02049

Political offices
Preceded by Willem Boreel van Hogelanden	Speaker of the House of Representatives; 1849–1850	Succeeded by Albertus Jacobus Duymaer van Twist
Preceded by Daniël Théodore Gevers van Endegeest	Speaker of the House of Representatives; 1856–1858	Succeeded by Willem Anne Schimmelpenninck van der Oye
