= Guillaume Groen van Prinsterer =

Dutch politician and historian (1801–1876)

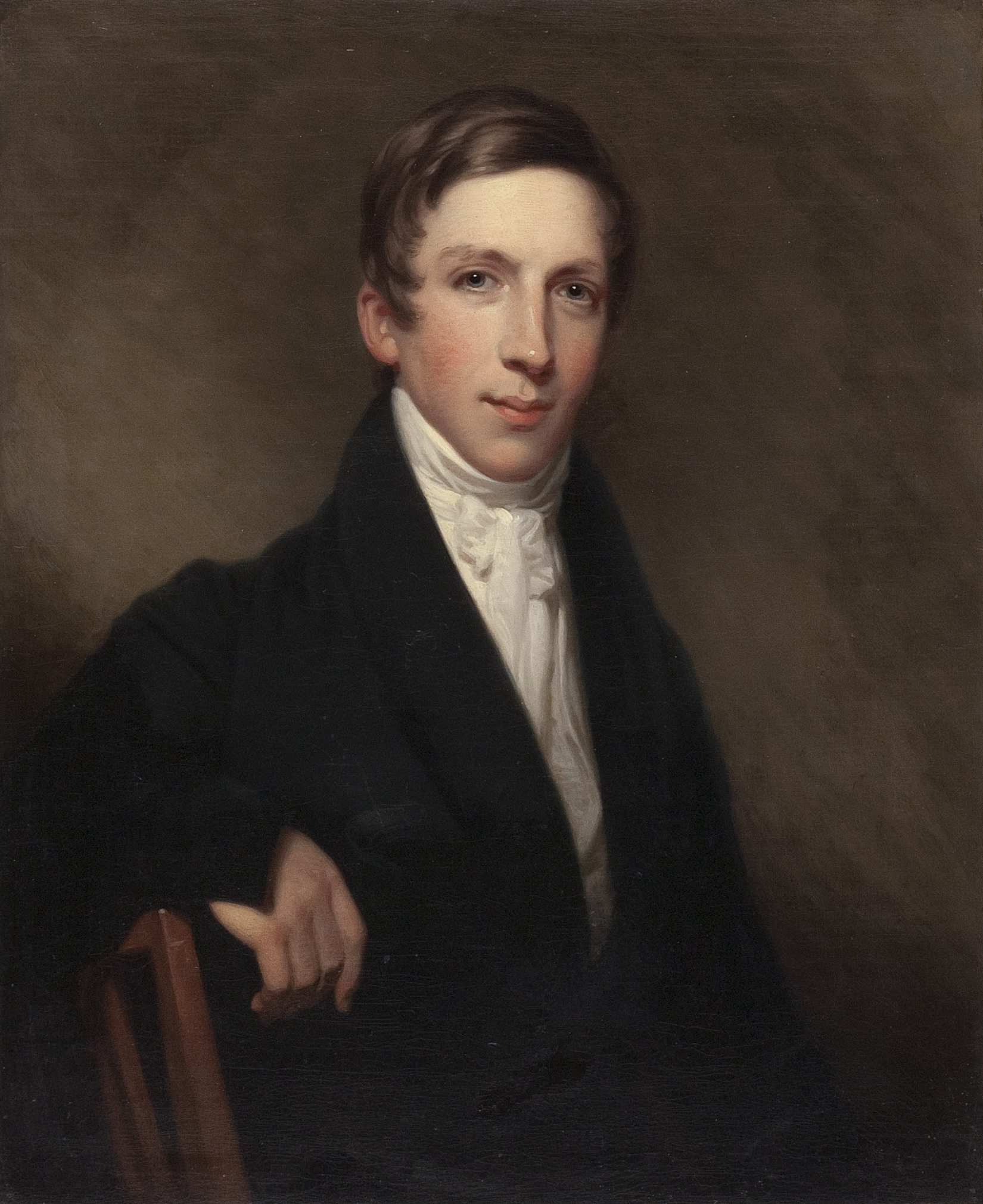
Guillaume Groen van Prinsterer

Guillaume Groen van Prinsterer (21 August 1801, Voorburg – 19 May 1876) was a Dutch politician and historian.

== Overview ==
Groen's father, Petrus Jacobus Groen van Prinsterer, was a physician and operated in aristocratic circles at an adult age.

He was a member of the Dutch Reformed Church, the state church of the Netherlands and of its Royal Family, although he deemed it to be in a poor condition. He was influenced by a then leading evangelical renewal movement known in the Netherlands as the Réveil, the European Continental counterpart to the Second Great Awakening.

He studied at Leiden University, and graduated in 1823 both as doctor of literature and LLD. From 1829 to 1833 he was a secretary to William II of the Netherlands. During this time he attended Brussels Protestant Church under pastor Merle d'Aubigné. After that, he took a prominent part in Dutch home politics, and becoming the leader of the Anti-Revolutionary Party, both in the Second Chamber of parliament, of which he was a member for many years, and as a political writer.

The doctrines of Guizot and Stahl influenced Groen. They permeate his controversial and political writings and historical studies, of which his Handbook of Dutch History (in Dutch) and Maurice et Barnevelt (in French, 1875, a criticism of Motley's Life of Van Olden-Barnevelt) are the most important. Groen was ardently opposed to Thorbecke, whose principles he denounced as ungodly and revolutionary. Although Groen lived to see these principles triumph in the constitutional reforms implemented by Thorbecke, he never ceased to oppose them until his death in 1876.

== Publications ==
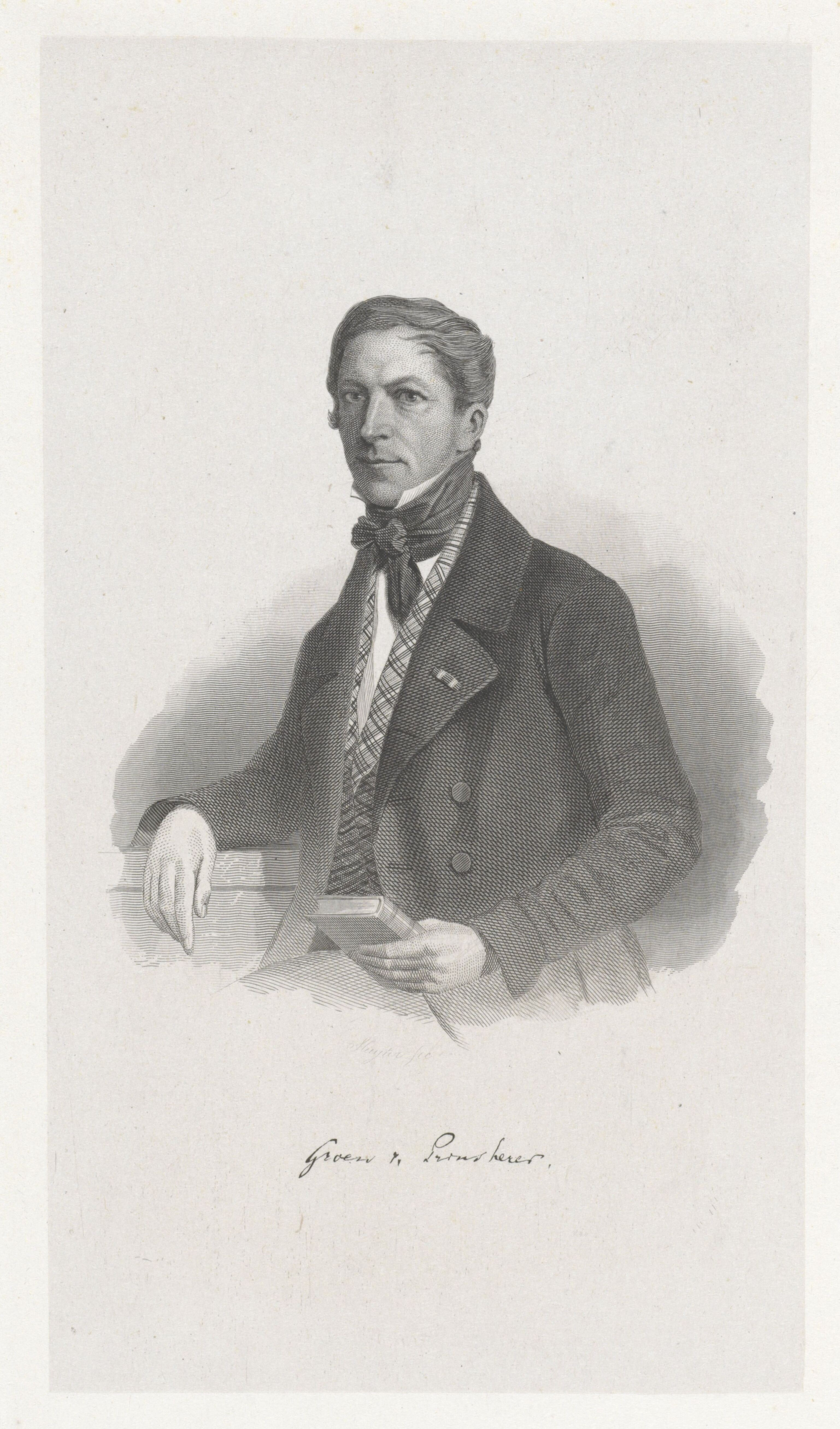
Guillaume Groen van Prinsterer

By the time the revolutionary movement in Europe had begun to break out in various cities, the monarchist and restorationist secretary to the Dutch king began lecturing on the spiritual-political crisis of the Continent. Groen also was ready to publish. He had begun to do so with his Overview of 1831, his Essay on Truth of 1834, a manuscript harder to date precisely but entitled Studies on the revolution, his Prolegomena of 1847 (the following year Karl Marx issued the Communist Manifesto). Groen's most influential work Lectures on Unbelief and Revolution appeared in an initial edition in 1847, and then a revised edition of 1868; there were subsequent editions as well. In time he founded an intellectual Christian political circle among the upper classes, through which Groen tried to teach the political responsibility of such people. In an effort to reach the Dutch intellectuals, he founded the daily newspaper De Nederlander from 1850 until 1855. Later on 1896, he published the weekly Nederlandsche Gedachten (Dutch Thoughts/Reflections).

He is best known as the editor of the Archives et correspondence de la maison d'Orange (12 vols, 1835-1845), which procured for him the title of the Dutch Gachard. John L. Motley acknowledges his indebtedness to Groen's Archives in the preface to his Rise of the Dutch Republic, at a time when the American historian had not yet made the acquaintance of King William's archivist. It also bore testimony to Groen's influence as a writer of history in the correspondence published after his death.

At the first reception, in 1858, of Motley at the royal palace at the Hague, the king presented him with a copy of Groen's Archives as a token of appreciation and admiration of the work done by of William I, prince of Orange. This copy, bearing the king's autograph inscription, afterwards came into the possession of Sir William Vernon Harcourt, Motley's son-in-law.

== Thoughts ==
The translator of the Dutch political thought and influence of Groen, Harry Van Dyke, has summarized Groen's mature view in this way:

"We are living in a condition of permanent revolution... revolutions are here to stay and will grow much worse in scope and intensity unless men can be persuaded to return to Christianity, to practise its precepts and to obey the Gospel in its full implications for human life and civilized society. Barring such a revival, the future would belong to socialism and communism, which on this view were but the most consistent sects of the new secular religion. To Groen, therefore, the political spectrum that presented itself to his generation offered no meaningful choice. "In terms of his analysis, the 'radical left' was composed of fanatical believers in the godless ideology; the 'liberal centre,' by comparison, by warm believers who warned against excesses and preached moderation; while the 'conservative right' embraced all those who lacked either the insight, the prudence, or the will to break with the modern tenets yet who recoiled from the consequences whenever the ideology was practised and implemented in any consistent way. None of the shades or 'nuances of secular liberalism represented a valid option for Christian citizens." Groen called for a rejection of the entire available spectrum of political positions, calling for a "radical alternative in politics, along anti-revolutionary, Christian-historical lines".

The South African scholar Jan Adriaan Schlebusch describes the basic theme of Groen's anti-revolutionary theory as follows:

"The dichotomy of revolution or rebellion against God on the one hand and faith in God on the other, was one that Groen believed to be ever-present throughout history. Groen therefore also understood this epistemic Revolution to be opposed to history, i.e. the divinely-ordained cosmic-historic telos of evangelistic progress and the glorification of the Lordship of Christ ... ‘Revolution’ for Groen was ultimately a denial of the sovereignty of God in favor of the sovereignty of mankind, with the ‘revolutionary’ ideas of the Enlightenment being the fruits of a rationalist religion wrongly elevating man-made abstractions as truths supreme over the revelation of God. This epistemic perspective shaped his political theory and engagement. Groen argued that the Revolution, not only as a historical-political phenomenon, but as a historical-philosophical development, amounted to an anti-Christian infringement upon the natural rights, established socio-political relationships, and justice system rooted in a divinely-ordained social order. Therefore the anti-revolutionary or Christian-historical position entailed opposing this epistemic Revolution as a path doomed to social disaster and political tyranny."

== Works in English translation ==
- Unbelief and Revolution: A Series of Lectures in History. Amsterdam: Groen van Prinsterer Fund, 1973-1975.
- The History of the Revolution in its First Phase. Amsterdam: Groen van Prinsterer Fund, 1978.
- Christian Political Action in an Age of Revolution. Translated by Collin Wright. Aalten, the Netherlands: WordBridge Publishing, 2015.
- Liberty, Equality, Fraternity: A Refutation of Liberalism. Translated by Jan Adriaan Schlebusch. St. Petersburg, FL: RefCon Press, 2022.
- A Christian Theory of Political Truth. Translated by Jan Adriaan Schlebusch. St. Petersburg, FL: RefCon Press, 2025.

House of Representatives of the Netherlands
New district	Member for Harderwijk; 1849–1850	District abolished
New seat representation increased to two members	Member for Zwolle; 1850–1854; With: Bartholomeus Sloet tot Oldhuis	Succeeded by Jacob van Zuylen van Nijevelt
Preceded by Willem Boreel van Hogelanden	Member for The Hague; 1855–1856; With: Isaäc Paul Delprat	Succeeded by Willem Theodore Gevers Deynoot
Preceded by Daniël Gevers van Endegeest	Member for Leiden; 1856–1857; With: Pieter Hendrik Taets van Amerongen	Succeeded by Rutger Jan Schimmelpenninck
Preceded by Æneas Mackay	Member for Arnhem; 1862–1865; With: Willem van Lynden	Succeeded by Jules van Zuylen van Nijevelt
