= Daniël Théodore Gevers van Endegeest =

Dutch politician

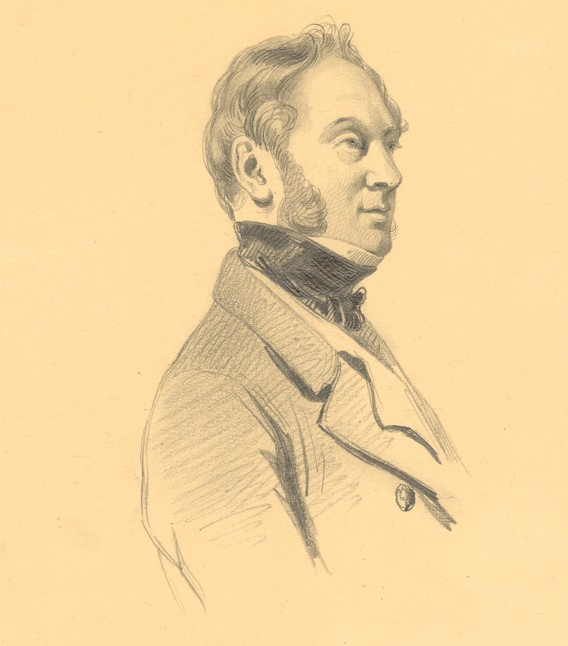
Portrait of Daniël Théodore Gevers van Endegeest (1843) by Nicolaas Pieneman.

Jonkheer Daniël Théodore Gevers van Endegeest (25 August 1793 – 27 July 1877) was a Dutch politician.

Gevers was born in Rotterdam, and died, aged 83, in Oegstgeest.

Political offices
Preceded by Edmond Willem van Dam van Isselt	Speaker of the House of Representatives; 1842–1843	Succeeded by Johannes Luyben
Preceded by Willem Boreel van Hogelanden	Speaker of the House of Representatives; 1855–1856	Succeeded by Jan Karel van Goltstein
Preceded by Floris Adriaan van Hall	Minister of Foreign Affairs; 1856–1858	Succeeded by Jan Karel van Goltstein
