= 1901 Dutch cabinet formation =

Formation of the Kuyper cabinet

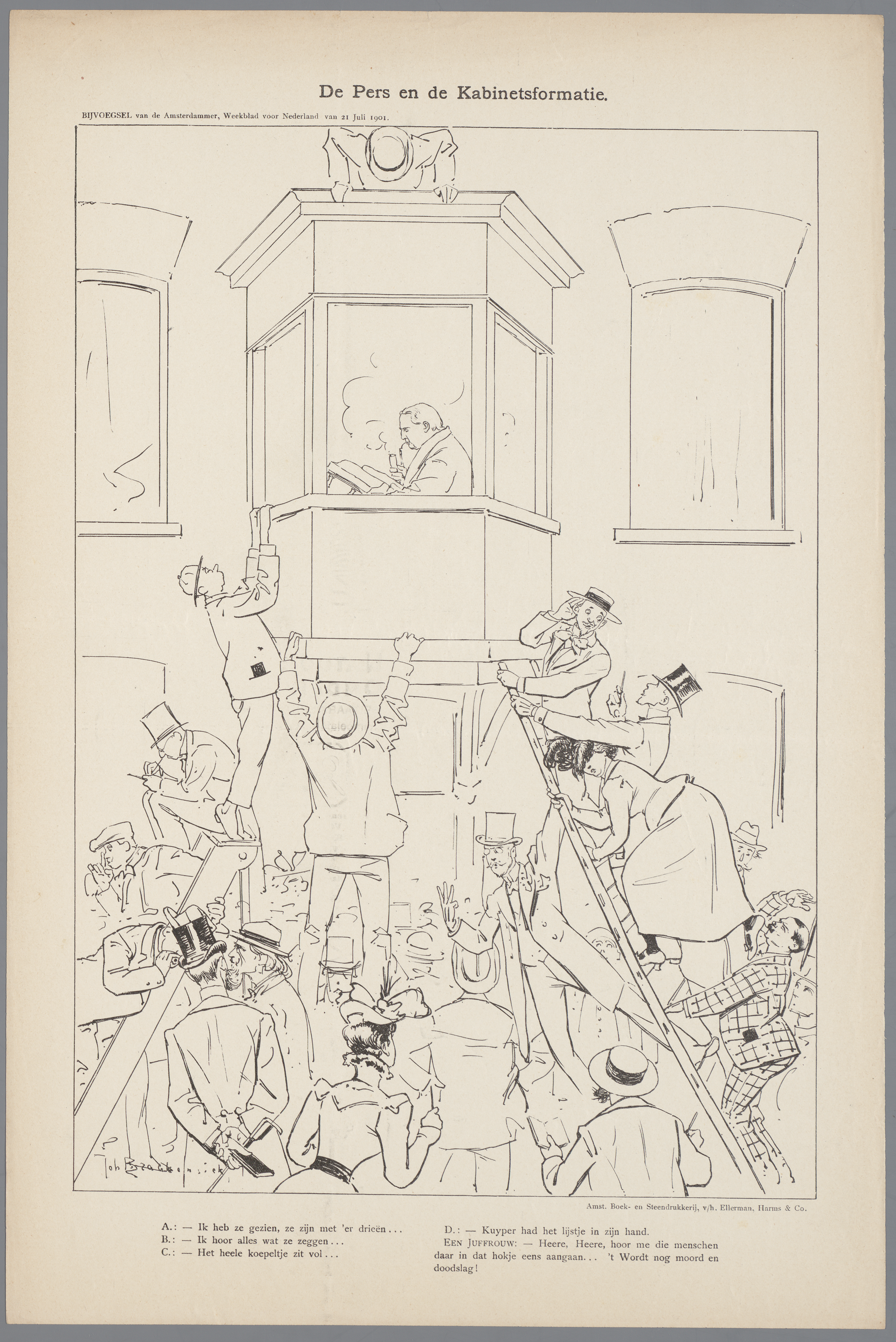
A cartoon titled The Press and the Cabinet Formation by Johan Braakensiek. Abraham Kuyper is working at the top while the journalists outside try to see what is happening inside.

A process of cabinet formation took place following the Dutch general election of 14 and 27 June 1901. The formation resulted in the Kuyper cabinet on 1 August 1901. It was the second coalition cabinet, because it consisted of Catholics and the Anti-Revolutionary Party (ARP). It was further supported by the Free Anti-Revolutionary Party (VAR) and the Christian Historical Voters' League (CHK).

The confessional victory and the role of Abraham Kuyper in it meant that Kuyper was appointed as formateur by queen Wilhelmina. The confessional parties managed to reach an agreement on the government programme within a week and a half. However, the appointment of ministers almost caused the formation to fail, especially for Interior. After Kuyper finally decided to lead that department himself, he was able to complete the formation.

== Background ==
After ten years of liberal cabinets, of which Pierson cabinet was the most recent, the liberals suffered a significant loss in the 1901 general election. The confessional parties obtained 47 seats in the first round on 14 June and rose to 58 of the 100 seats in the second round of voting. The largest group was the Catholics with 25 seats, immediately followed by the Anti-Revolutionary Party (ARP) with 24 seats. The other confessional parties were the Free Anti-Revolutionary Party (7 seats), the Christian Historical Voters' League (CHK, 1 seat) and the Frisian League (1 seat). These parties did not have a majority in the Senate. The parties could obtain this by dissolution of the Senate, because they had also won significantly in the simultaneously held Provincial Council elections of 1901. (Note: After the 1904 Dutch provincial elections this actually happened, which led to the 1904 Dutch Senate election)

== Constultations ==
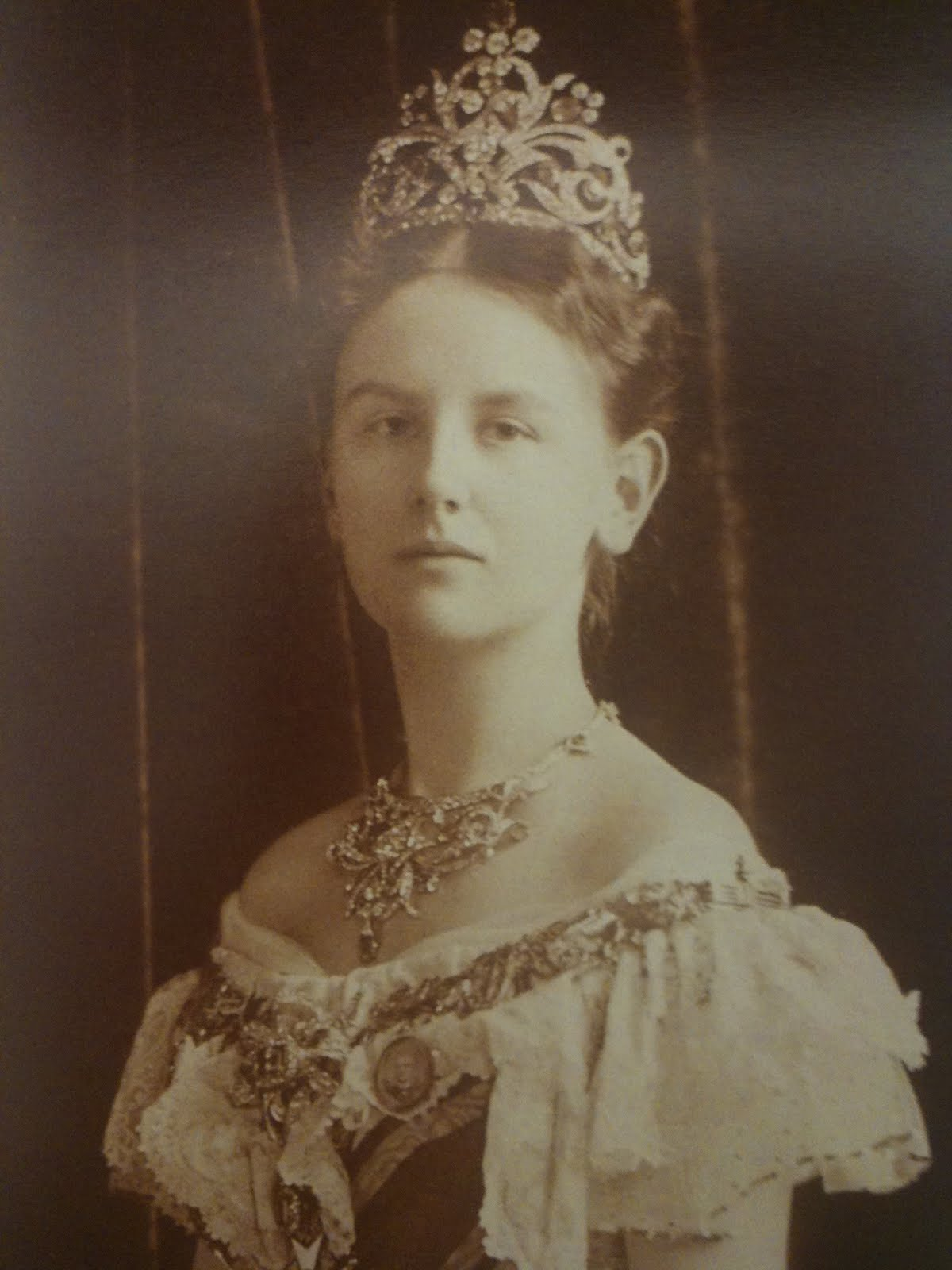
Queen Wilhelmina, 1901

On 2, 3 and 4 July, the queen Wilhelmina, who had ascended the throne in 1898, received her most important counselors; Chairman of the Senate Albertus van Naamen van Eemnes, Minister of State Johan George Gleichman and Vice-President of the Council of State Johan Willem Meinard Schorer. The three counselors – with a liberal background – considered ARP leader Abraham Kuyper the most logical formateur. A Catholic formateur, despite the Catholics being the largest party, would encounter too much resistance. Van Naamen van Eemnes and Gleichman did advise consulting other confessional politicians in advance, which Schorer advised against to remain neutral. Van Naamen van Eemnes advised the queen to ask for guarantees on a number of issues, such as Dutch neutrality in the Second Boer War, continuation of the Aceh War, as little state interference as possible in the social field and as minimum increase of import duties. These were topics that Kuyper thought differently about.

Even before the discussions with the liberal counselors, she had asked the director of the Queen's Cabinet Petrus Johannes Vegelin van Claerbergen to seek advice from the anti-revolutionary state council Ulrich Herman Huber, the free anti-revolutionary leader Alexander de Savornin Lohman and the former ARP prime minister Æneas Mackay (who had to return from Austrian-Hungarian Teplice). They also pointed to Kuyper as formateur, despite the differences they noted between the confessional parties.

== Formateur Kuyper ==
=== Preliminary discussions ===
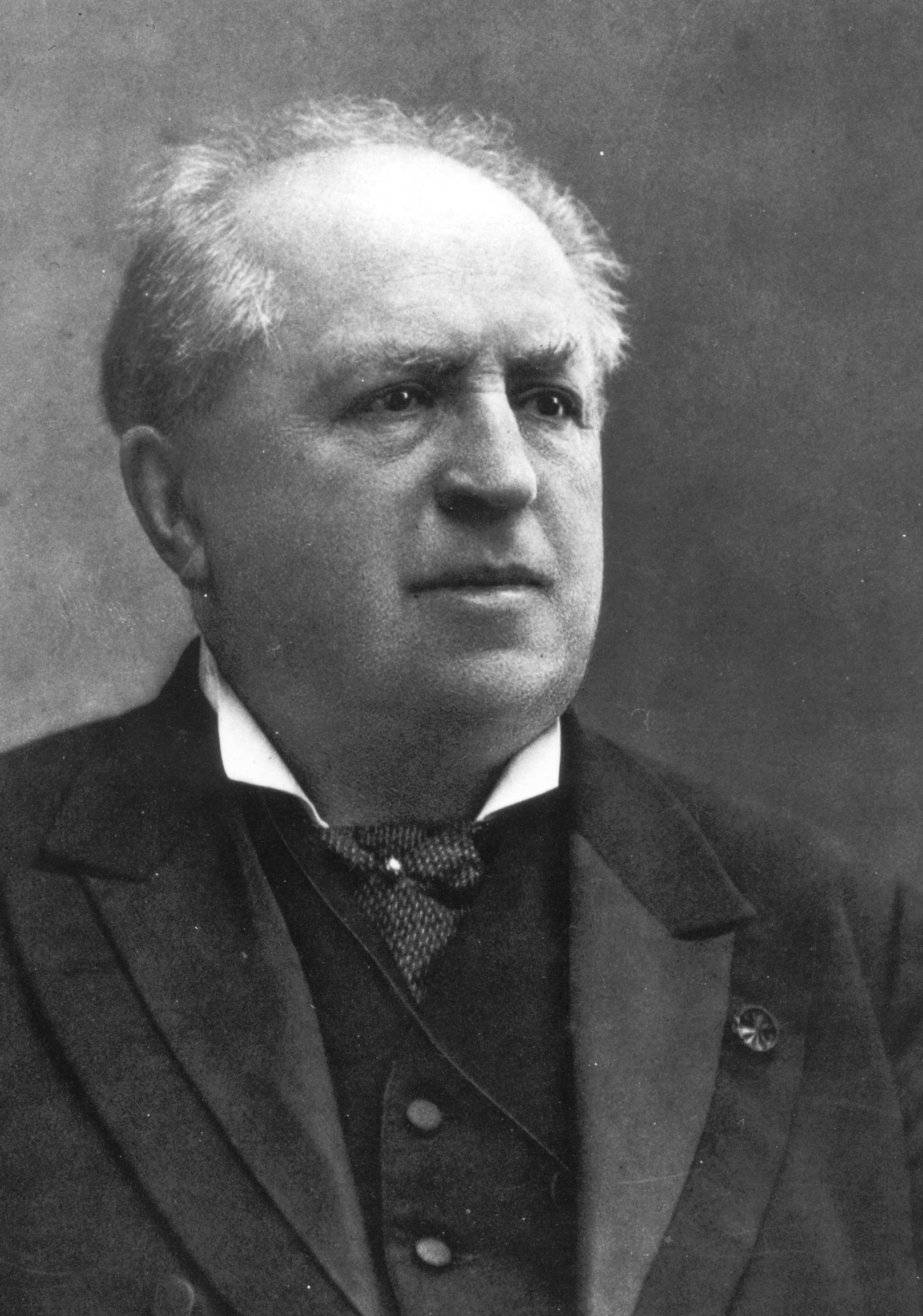
Formateur Abraham Kuyper, 1905

Although Kuyper was dreading the formateurship, which he still suspected would go to Mackay, Kuyper started approaching potential ministers within his own circle even before his appointment. He also asked Mackay, who indicated that he was not available for the position of minister and formateur. On 1 July, he also sent a request to the Catholic faction asking it to form a committee from among its members with whom the anti-revolutionaries could negotiate a government programme. The faction agreed to this and announced that this committee would consist of faction leader Herman Schaepman, Jan Harte van Tecklenburg and Jacobus Antonius Nicolaas Travaglino on 10 July.

On 11 July, Kuyper came to talk to Wilhelmina at Het Loo Palace. Wilhelmina asked if he could agree to continuing the Aceh policy of General Jo van Heutsz, the neutrality in the Boer War and the continuation of the army reform of minister Arthur Kool. Kuyper agreed with all points. The issue of duties was not mentioned, because Mackay had already reassured Wilhelmina that Kuyper was only moderately in favour of it. Wilhelmina then offered him the formateurship. However, Kuyper requested to be allowed to consider this for two days, due to difficulties in becoming a minister in the cabinet himself. Wilhelmina agreed. He also proposed splitting the ministry of Water Management, Commerce and Industry into the ministry of Water Management and Transport, and the ministry of Labour and Business. The latter would be the ministry for which he considered himself suitable.

The reason for the delay was largely due to the free anti-revolutionaries, whom Kuyper had not yet contacted. On 12 July, Kuyper spoke with Lohman. Lohman indicated that he considered Kuyper suitable as a minister, depending on the ministry. Lohman was able to agree to the proposal for the split-off ministry of Labour with Kuyper as minister. Lohman indicated that he himself could not accept a ministership for political reasons. A day later, Kuyper informed Wilhelmina that he accepted the assignment "however hesitantly".

=== Government programme ===
His first task was to draw up the government programme, for which he contacted the Catholic delegate committee, the free anti-revolutionaries and the recently elected Jan Schokking (Frisian League). Kuyper and Schaepman often had contact without the committee, with which Schaepman took more control from the Catholic side. The only Member of Parliament for the CHK, Johannes Theodoor de Visser, could not reach Kuyper due to a stay abroad. He discussed it further in plenary with his own group. He had no contact with politicians other than these about the programme. He discussed it further outside politics with the conservative professor Paul Fabius.

Kuyper managed to reach an agreement with the Catholics on 18 July. There were some adjustments, such as that the increase in import duties should benefit social reforms. The free anti-revolutionaries agreed on 22 July, but did not want to be bound by the programme. Kuyper tried to get the free anti-revolutionaries to agree to universal suffrage, which was requested by members of his own faction. However, Lohman was adamant about this. The fact that all parties were ultimately able to agree was mainly due to the fact that much of it was formulated in general terms.

=== Ministers ===
The appointment of ministers was more difficult, partly due to the fact that the number of suitable people in the confessional parties was not large, the free-anti-revolutionaries did not want to join the cabinet and the Catholics did not want former ministers from the Mackay cabinet. Kuyper nominated the anti-revolutionary Member of Parliament Titus van Asch van Wijck for the ministry of the Colonies, although he considered him "not strong". Kuyper had nominated anti-revolutionary Robert Melvil van Lijnden for Foreign Affairs. Both Mackay and Lohman initially rejected him and Melvil van Lijnden himself also had doubts, but eventually agreed.

Kuyper wanted Kool to stay on as minister of War, but he indicated that he did not like that as a liberal former Member of Parliament. Kool suggested working as one of two directors general in a combined ministry of War and Navy. The first candidate for the ministership of the combined ministry was Hendrik Seret, but Kuyper concluded at the first interview that he was unsuitable. Subsequently, former Catholic minister of War Johannes Willem Bergansius was selected, despite having been minister in the Mackay cabinet. There was also some friction between Kuyper and Schaepman, because Kuyper had approached Bergansius through Harte van Tecklenburg, to his dissatisfaction. Harte van Tecklenburg himself was nominated by the Catholics as minister of Finance and Jan Loeff for Justice. By appointing a Catholic to the ministry of War, the ministry of Water Management went to the anti-revolutionary Johannes Christiaan de Marez Oyens.

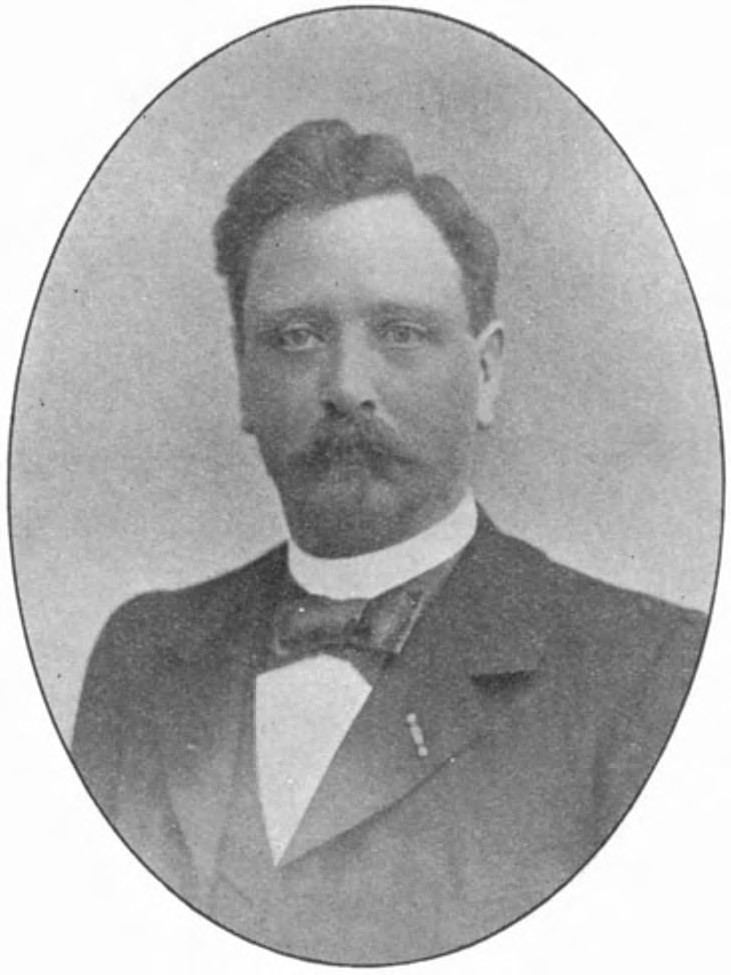
Theo Heemskerk, 1901

On 24 July, Kuyper had a candidate for every ministership, except for the Interior. In any case, the Protestants did not want a Catholic in the Ministry of the Interior, because this ministry was concerned with education. Kuyper initially had Catholic candidates in mind such as Harte van Tecklenburg and Gustave Ruijs de Beerenbrouck, but both Mackay and Lohman objected to this. Kuyper had asked Lohman and Mackay himself, but they refused. On 21 July, Kuyper had spoken with the Amsterdam anti-revolutionary councillor Theo Heemskerk, whom he previously had in mind for Finance. Heemskerk indicated that he had little interest in becoming a minister, but did not make a final decision. In the following days, Kuyper pressed Heemskerk. Heemskerk rejected it definitively on 23 July, after his wife wrote to him Kuyper ist ein Luegner ("Kuyper is a liar"). It led to permanent deterioration in relations between Kuyper and the later prime minister Heemskerk.

The failure of talks with Heemskerk led to concern among the negotiators involved. Schaepman suggested appointing a Catholic, which was once again out of the question for the Protestants. Lohman feared that he would be approached again for the position of minister, which would put him in a dire situation because if he refused the formation would probably fail. Ultimately, however, it was Kuyper who decided to take on the position of minister of the Interior himself, after asking Mackay again. Despite the workload, he also included the Labour portfolio to be able to work on the social face of the cabinet.

To reduce the workload, he wanted to make the Agriculture Department an independent ministry, for which the anti-revolutionary Jacob Petrus Havelaar was approached on 26 July. Havelaar only wanted to do this temporarily and first consult his doctor. However, before Havelaar could announce that he accepted it, Kuyper had already decided to transfer Agriculture to Water Management, Commerce and Industry. Because the Catholics had too much influence with three of the seven ministers, Navy remained as a separate ministry headed by the non-partisan Protestant Gerhardus Kruys.

=== Final report ===
On 27 July Kuyper brought his final report to Vegelin van Claerbergen, who would hand it over to the queen. That same day, the future ministers met at Harte van Tecklenburg's home in The Hague. Although they had chosen an inconspicuous location, journalists found out and the names appeared in the newspaper the next day. This led to dissatisfaction with Wilhelmina, who believed that Kuyper had inappropriately sought publicity, after having previously published a confidential communication from her in the newspaper. Wilhelmina communicated this dissatisfaction to Kuyper via Vegelin van Claerbergen and deliberately postponed a meeting with Kuyper until 30 July. After the meeting, she appointed Kuyper as minister of the Interior and the other ministers followed a day later. On 1 August they were sworn in at Soestdijk Palace.
