= 1897 Dutch general election =

- 15 June 1897 (first round); 25 June 1897 (second round)
- All 100 seats in the House of Representatives; 51 seats needed for a majority
- Turnout: 78.04% (first round); 82.00% (second round)
Party	Leader	Seats	+/–
LU	Hendrik Goeman Borgesius	38	
Catholic	Franciscus Dobbelmann	22	
ARP	Abraham Kuyper	18	
VL	Joan Röell	8	
RL	Willem Treub	4	
VAR	Alexander de Savornin Lohman	4	
SDAP	Pieter Jelles Troelstra	4	
CHK	Johannes Theodoor de Visser	2	
This lists parties that won seats. See the complete results below.
Cabinet before	Cabinet after
Röell cabinet Liberal	Pierson cabinet Liberal

General elections were held in the Netherlands on 15 June 1897, with a second round in 50 constituencies on 25 June. The Liberal Union remained the largest party, winning 38 of the 100 seats in the House of Representatives.

== Electoral system ==
The 100 seats in the House of Representatives were elected in single-member constituencies using the two-round system.

== Results ==
Party	First round			Second round			Total seats
Party	Votes	%	Seats	Votes	%	Seats	Total seats
Liberal Union	124,224	30.15	13	84,236	37.72	25	38
Anti-Revolutionary Party	108,681	26.38	10	61,399	27.49	8	18
Catholics	81,112	19.69	22	29,913	13.39	0	22
Christian Historical Voters' League	21,551	5.23	1	1,460	0.65	1	2
Free Liberals	20,589	5.00	1	18,496	8.28	7	8
Radical League	15,663	3.80	1	11,361	5.09	3	4
Free Anti Revolutionary Party	15,095	3.66	2	7,720	3.46	2	4
Social Democratic Workers' Party	13,309	3.23	0	8,761	3.92	4	4
Liberal Protectionist	1,486	0.36	0				0
Independent	10,320	2.50	0				0
Total	412,030	100.00	50	223,346	100.00	50	100
Valid votes	412,030	98.46		223,346	99.03		
Invalid/blank votes	6,465	1.54		2,195	0.97		
Total votes	418,495	100.00		225,541	100.00		
Registered voters/turnout	536,241	78.04		275,057	82.00		
Source: Kiesraad, Huygens

=== By district ===
Results by district
District	Candidate	Party	First round		Second round	
District	Candidate	Party	Votes	%	Votes	%
Alkmaar	T. A. J. van Asch van Wijck	Anti-Revolutionary Party	2,719	42.45	2,830	42.72
Alkmaar	E. Fokker	Liberal Union	2,158	33.69	3,795	57.28
Alkmaar	W. van der Kaay	Free Liberals	1,413	22.06		
Alkmaar	J. G. van Kuykhof	Social Democratic Workers' Party	115	1.80		
Alkmaar	Valid votes		6,405	99.09	6,625	99.34
Alkmaar	Invalid/blank votes		59	0.91	44	0.66
Alkmaar	Total votes		6,464	100	6,669	100
Alkmaar	Registered voters/turnout		7,236	89.33	7,236	92.16
Almelo	H. J. A. M. Schaepman	Catholic	3,504	54.14		
Almelo	P. van Vliet	Anti-Revolutionary Party	1,295	20.01		
Almelo	H. Goeman Borgesius	Liberal Union	771	11.91		
Almelo	W. P. Zeilmaker	Radical League	467	7.22		
Almelo	W. P. G. Helsdingen	Social Democratic Workers' Party	435	6.72		
Almelo	Valid votes		6,472	98.19		
Almelo	Invalid/blank votes		119	1.81		
Almelo	Total votes		6,591	100		
Almelo	Registered voters/turnout		7,567	87.10		
Amersfoort	F. D. graaf van Schimmelpenninck	Free Anti Revolutionary Party	2,682	47.30	3,333	69.14
Amersfoort	T. A. J. van Asch van Wijck	Anti-Revolutionary Party	1,353	23.86	1,488	30.86
Amersfoort	W. H. de Beaufort	Free Liberals	1,283	22.63		
Amersfoort	C. A. Zelvelder	Liberal Union	352	6.21		
Amersfoort	Valid votes		5,670	98.99	4,821	99.22
Amersfoort	Invalid/blank votes		58	1.01	38	0.78
Amersfoort	Total votes		5,728	100	4,859	100
Amersfoort	Registered voters/turnout		6,994	81.90	6,994	69.47
Amsterdam I	H. J. A. M. Schaepman	Catholic	832	29.90	1,111	33.27
Amsterdam I	M. J. Pijnappel	Free Liberals	747	26.84	2,228	66.73
Amsterdam I	A. Kerdijk	Liberal Union	421	15.13		
Amsterdam I	J. Bosch	Catholic	230	8.26		
Amsterdam I	A. L. van Hasselt	Christian Historical Voters' League	228	8.19		
Amsterdam I	C. H. Kouw	Liberal Union	220	7.91		
Amsterdam I	W. H. Vliegen	Social Democratic Workers' Party	105	3.77		
Amsterdam I	Valid votes		2,783	97.99	3,339	98.47
Amsterdam I	Invalid/blank votes		57	2.01	52	1.53
Amsterdam I	Total votes		2,840	100	3,391	100
Amsterdam I	Registered voters/turnout		4,760	59.66	4,760	71.24
Amsterdam II	H. F. Groen van Waarder	Free Liberals	414	28.43	854	52.75
Amsterdam II	F. G. Mellink Pzn.	Anti-Revolutionary Party	400	27.47	765	47.25
Amsterdam II	G. A. Aalderink	Radical League	213	14.63		
Amsterdam II	T. J. Weesing	Catholic	180	12.36		
Amsterdam II	A. D. de Marez Oyens	Christian Historical Voters' League	163	11.20		
Amsterdam II	W. P. G. Helsdingen	Social Democratic Workers' Party	86	5.91		
Amsterdam II	Valid votes		1,456	99.12	1,619	99.08
Amsterdam II	Invalid/blank votes		13	0.88	15	0.92
Amsterdam II	Total votes		1,469	100	1,634	100
Amsterdam II	Registered voters/turnout		2,250	65.29	2,250	72.62
Amsterdam III	A. F. K. Hartogh	Liberal Union	1,015	36.33	2,238	71.75
Amsterdam III	W. Hovy	Anti-Revolutionary Party	679	24.30	881	28.25
Amsterdam III	C. V. Gerritsen	Radical League	626	22.41		
Amsterdam III	F. van der Goes	Social Democratic Workers' Party	270	9.66		
Amsterdam III	H. Verkouteren	Christian Historical Voters' League	204	7.30		
Amsterdam III	Valid votes		2,794	98.66	3,119	99.11
Amsterdam III	Invalid/blank votes		38	1.34	28	0.89
Amsterdam III	Total votes		2,832	100	3,147	100
Amsterdam III	Registered voters/turnout		4,566	62.02	4,566	68.92
Amsterdam IV	J. G. Gleichman	Free Liberals	867	43.90	1,234	52.27
Amsterdam IV	Z. van den Bergh	Radical League	522	26.43	1,127	47.73
Amsterdam IV	A. H. M. van Berckel	Catholic	213	10.78		
Amsterdam IV	J. Loopuit	Social Democratic Workers' Party	150	7.59		
Amsterdam IV	F. H. van Eeghen	Anti-Revolutionary Party	116	5.87		
Amsterdam IV	H. P. C. W. H. J. B. van Son	Christian Historical Voters' League	107	5.42		
Amsterdam IV	Valid votes		1,975	98.70	2,361	98.91
Amsterdam IV	Invalid/blank votes		26	1.30	26	1.09
Amsterdam IV	Total votes		2,001	100	2,387	100
Amsterdam IV	Registered voters/turnout		3,268	61.23	3,268	73.04
Amsterdam V	N. G. Pierson	Liberal Union	1,128	32.10	1,789	46.23
Amsterdam V	T. M. Ketelaar	Radical League	911	25.92	2,081	53.77
Amsterdam V	W. C. J. Passtoors	Catholic	545	15.51		
Amsterdam V	D. P. D. Fabius	Anti-Revolutionary Party	486	13.83		
Amsterdam V	H. P. C. W. H. J. B. van Son	Christian Historical Voters' League	322	9.16		
Amsterdam V	J. G. van Kuykhof	Social Democratic Workers' Party	122	3.47		
Amsterdam V	Valid votes		3,514	98.90	3,870	98.95
Amsterdam V	Invalid/blank votes		39	1.10	41	1.05
Amsterdam V	Total votes		3,553	100	3,911	100
Amsterdam V	Registered voters/turnout		5,945	59.76	5,945	65.79
Amsterdam VI	J. T. Cremer	Liberal Union	1,484	47.31	2,340	68.12
Amsterdam VI	P. J. H. Cuypers	Catholic	789	25.15	1,095	31.88
Amsterdam VI	J. D. Root Jr.	Anti-Revolutionary Party	442	14.09		
Amsterdam VI	H. Verkouteren	Christian Historical Voters' League	422	13.45		
Amsterdam VI	Valid votes		3,137	100.00	3,435	99.88
Amsterdam VI	Invalid/blank votes		0	0.00	4	0.12
Amsterdam VI	Total votes		3,137	100	3,439	100
Amsterdam VI	Registered voters/turnout		5,040	62.24	5,040	68.23
Amsterdam VII	B. H. Heldt	Liberal Union	901	37.35	1,561	59.44
Amsterdam VII	W. C. J. Passtoors	Catholic	622	25.79	1,065	40.56
Amsterdam VII	G. H. Wagenaar	Anti-Revolutionary Party	438	18.16		
Amsterdam VII	H. P. C. W. H. J. B. van Son	Christian Historical Voters' League	283	11.73		
Amsterdam VII	J. A. Fortuyn	Social Democratic Workers' Party	168	6.97		
Amsterdam VII	Valid votes		2,412	97.22	2,626	98.94
Amsterdam VII	Invalid/blank votes		69	2.78	28	1.06
Amsterdam VII	Total votes		2,481	100	2,654	100
Amsterdam VII	Registered voters/turnout		3,667	67.66	3,667	72.38
Amsterdam VIII	P. Nolting	Radical League	459	27.72	927	51.93
Amsterdam VIII	Th. Heemskerk	Anti-Revolutionary Party	383	23.13	858	48.07
Amsterdam VIII	W. C. J. Passtoors	Catholic	355	21.44		
Amsterdam VIII	I. A. Levy	Independent	254	15.34		
Amsterdam VIII	A. Harmsen Jr.	Christian Historical Voters' League	205	12.38		
Amsterdam VIII	Valid votes		1,656	98.22	1,785	98.24
Amsterdam VIII	Invalid/blank votes		30	1.78	32	1.76
Amsterdam VIII	Total votes		1,686	100	1,817	100
Amsterdam VIII	Registered voters/turnout		2,462	68.48	2,462	73.80
Amsterdam IX	J. P. R. Tak van Poortvliet	Liberal Union	1,520	44.90	2,309	63.00
Amsterdam IX	A. Kuyper	Anti-Revolutionary Party	1,142	33.74	1,356	37.00
Amsterdam IX	J. T. de Visser	Christian Historical Voters' League	472	13.94		
Amsterdam IX	J. A. Fortuyn	Social Democratic Workers' Party	251	7.42		
Amsterdam IX	Valid votes		3,385	100.00	3,665	99.84
Amsterdam IX	Invalid/blank votes		0	0.00	6	0.16
Amsterdam IX	Total votes		3,385	100	3,671	100
Amsterdam IX	Registered voters/turnout		5,215	64.91	5,215	70.39
Apeldoorn	W. K. F. P. graaf van Bylandt	Free Anti Revolutionary Party	2,455	50.52		
Apeldoorn	H. C. van der Houven van Oordt	Liberal Union	2,164	44.54		
Apeldoorn	J. G. van Kuykhof	Social Democratic Workers' Party	240	4.94		
Apeldoorn	Valid votes		4,859	98.24		
Apeldoorn	Invalid/blank votes		87	1.76		
Apeldoorn	Total votes		4,946	100		
Apeldoorn	Registered voters/turnout		6,693	73.90		
Appingedam	J. Schepel	Liberal Union	2,128	38.12	3,720	62.44
Appingedam	J. Bouwes	Anti-Revolutionary Party	1,923	34.44	2,238	37.56
Appingedam	J. Schoonbeek	Social Democratic Workers' Party	860	15.40		
Appingedam	J. Doornbosch	Liberal Protectionist	621	11.12		
Appingedam	O. Q. van Swinderen	Christian Historical Voters' League	51	0.91		
Appingedam	Valid votes		5,583	98.12	5,958	99.22
Appingedam	Invalid/blank votes		107	1.88	47	0.78
Appingedam	Total votes		5,690	100	6,005	100
Appingedam	Registered voters/turnout		6,976	81.57	6,976	86.08
Arnhem	P. Rink	Liberal Union	2,130	50.69		
Arnhem	H. J. A. M. Schaepman	Catholic	1,168	27.80		
Arnhem	A. D. P. V. van Löben Sels	Independent	567	13.49		
Arnhem	H. H. van Kol	Social Democratic Workers' Party	337	8.02		
Arnhem	Valid votes		4,202	98.48		
Arnhem	Invalid/blank votes		65	1.52		
Arnhem	Total votes		4,267	100		
Arnhem	Registered voters/turnout		4,972	85.82		
Assen	J. J. Willinge	Liberal Union	2,200	57.70		
Assen	H. J. Timmerman	Liberal Union	1,032	27.07		
Assen	P. van Vliet	Anti-Revolutionary Party	581	15.24		
Assen	Valid votes		3,813	99.32		
Assen	Invalid/blank votes		26	0.68		
Assen	Total votes		3,839	100		
Assen	Registered voters/turnout		6,310	60.84		
Bergen op Zoom	L. D. J. L. de Ram	Catholic	3,577	76.07		
Bergen op Zoom	G. W. Bruinsma	Liberal Union	1,125	23.93		
Bergen op Zoom	Valid votes		4,702	98.55		
Bergen op Zoom	Invalid/blank votes		69	1.45		
Bergen op Zoom	Total votes		4,771	100		
Bergen op Zoom	Registered voters/turnout		6,406	74.48		
Beverwijk	T. L. M. H. Borret	Catholic	2,905	48.54	3,137	49.15
Beverwijk	J. P. R. Tak van Poortvliet	Liberal Union	2,537	42.39	3,246	50.85
Beverwijk	P. Vermeulen	Anti-Revolutionary Party	344	5.75		
Beverwijk	W. Bax	Social Democratic Workers' Party	199	3.32		
Beverwijk	Valid votes		5,985	98.89	6,383	99.50
Beverwijk	Invalid/blank votes		67	1.11	32	0.50
Beverwijk	Total votes		6,052	100	6,415	100
Beverwijk	Registered voters/turnout		6,719	90.07	6,719	95.48
Bodegraven	J. C. von Briel Sasse	Anti-Revolutionary Party	2,470	46.07	3,034	50.38
Bodegraven	A. Knijff	Liberal Union	1,810	33.76	2,988	49.62
Bodegraven	N. D. Kemink	Free Anti Revolutionary Party	629	11.73		
Bodegraven	J. Ortt	Christian Historical Voters' League	452	8.43		
Bodegraven	Valid votes		5,361	97.51	6,022	99.00
Bodegraven	Invalid/blank votes		137	2.49	61	1.00
Bodegraven	Total votes		5,498	100	6,083	100
Bodegraven	Registered voters/turnout		6,787	81.01	6,787	89.63
Breda	L. P. M. H. baron van Michiels van Verduynen	Catholic	2,367	79.38		
Breda	J. H. H. Dommers	Independent	615	20.62		
Breda	Valid votes		2,982	97.64		
Breda	Invalid/blank votes		72	2.36		
Breda	Total votes		3,054	100		
Breda	Registered voters/turnout		5,263	58.03		
Breukelen	J. H. de Waal Malefijt	Anti-Revolutionary Party	3,441	54.39		
Breukelen	J. E. Huydecoper van Maarseveen en Nichteve	Independent	2,308	36.48		
Breukelen	O. J. E. baron van Wassenaer van Catwijck	Free Anti Revolutionary Party	577	9.12		
Breukelen	Valid votes		6,326	99.17		
Breukelen	Invalid/blank votes		53	0.83		
Breukelen	Total votes		6,379	100		
Breukelen	Registered voters/turnout		7,149	89.23		
Brielle	G. J. Goekoop	Liberal Union	2,277	53.39		
Brielle	A. P. Staalman	Anti-Revolutionary Party	1,646	38.59		
Brielle	A. D. van Assendelft de Coningh	Liberal Protectionist	342	8.02		
Brielle	Valid votes		4,265	97.60		
Brielle	Invalid/blank votes		105	2.40		
Brielle	Total votes		4,370	100		
Brielle	Registered voters/turnout		5,308	82.33		
Delft	H. A. van de Velde	Anti-Revolutionary Party	2,042	49.16	2,327	53.09
Delft	N. G. Pierson	Liberal Union	1,288	31.01	2,056	46.91
Delft	O. J. E. baron van Wassenaer van Catwijck	Free Anti Revolutionary Party	581	13.99		
Delft	P. Nolting	Radical League	243	5.85		
Delft	Valid votes		4,154	98.32	4,383	98.81
Delft	Invalid/blank votes		71	1.68	53	1.19
Delft	Total votes		4,225	100	4,436	100
Delft	Registered voters/turnout		5,119	82.54	5,119	86.66
Den Bosch	J. A. Loeff	Catholic	2,024	82.51		
Den Bosch	P. Rink	Liberal Union	429	17.49		
Den Bosch	Valid votes		2,453	97.85		
Den Bosch	Invalid/blank votes		54	2.15		
Den Bosch	Total votes		2,507	100		
Den Bosch	Registered voters/turnout		4,416	56.77		
Den Haag I	J. Krap	Anti-Revolutionary Party	1,967	51.60		
Den Haag I	H. J. Smidt	Liberal Union	1,026	26.92		
Den Haag I	F. Mol	Radical League	507	13.30		
Den Haag I	J. Roëll	Free Liberals	266	6.98		
Den Haag I	J. P. Crombet	Independent	46	1.21		
Den Haag I	Valid votes		3,812	99.01		
Den Haag I	Invalid/blank votes		38	0.99		
Den Haag I	Total votes		3,850	100		
Den Haag I	Registered voters/turnout		5,025	76.62		
Den Haag II	J. F. W. Conrad	Free Liberals	1,777	39.81	2,695	56.25
Den Haag II	H. A. le Bron de Vexela	Catholic	1,562	34.99	2,096	43.75
Den Haag II	A. W. F. Idenburg	Anti-Revolutionary Party	588	13.17		
Den Haag II	F. Mol	Radical League	348	7.80		
Den Haag II	A. M. W. L. P. C. van Daehne van Varick	Independent	121	2.71		
Den Haag II	W. J. D. van Meeteren Brouwer	Liberal Union	68	1.52		
Den Haag II	Valid votes		4,464	98.91	4,791	99.05
Den Haag II	Invalid/blank votes		49	1.09	46	0.95
Den Haag II	Total votes		4,513	100	4,837	100
Den Haag II	Registered voters/turnout		5,834	77.36	5,834	82.91
Den Haag III	J. M. Pijnacker Hordijk	Liberal Union	1,425	35.39	2,407	56.73
Den Haag III	J. D. baron van Wassenaer van Rosande	Free Anti Revolutionary Party	961	23.86	1,836	43.27
Den Haag III	H. J. G. van Hoogstraten	Catholic	885	21.98		
Den Haag III	H. D. Guyot	Free Liberals	756	18.77		
Den Haag III	Valid votes		4,027	98.75	4,243	99.51
Den Haag III	Invalid/blank votes		51	1.25	21	0.49
Den Haag III	Total votes		4,078	100	4,264	100
Den Haag III	Registered voters/turnout		5,586	73.00	5,586	76.33
Den Helder	A. P. Staalman	Anti-Revolutionary Party	2,535	48.33	2,918	54.30
Den Helder	C. Lely	Liberal Union	1,842	35.12	2,456	45.70
Den Helder	H. J. A. M. Schaepman	Catholic	775	14.78		
Den Helder	J. Korver	Anti-Revolutionary Party	77	1.47		
Den Helder	J. C. Jansen	Liberal Union	16	0.31		
Den Helder	Valid votes		5,245	98.57	5,374	99.04
Den Helder	Invalid/blank votes		76	1.43	52	0.96
Den Helder	Total votes		5,321	100	5,426	100
Den Helder	Registered voters/turnout		6,598	80.65	6,598	82.24
Deventer	A. van Delden	Free Liberals	2,216	37.30	2,256	40.99
Deventer	J. Stoffel	Radical League	1,643	27.66	3,248	59.01
Deventer	H. J. A. M. Schaepman	Catholic	1,355	22.81		
Deventer	J. W. Koer	Anti-Revolutionary Party	458	7.71		
Deventer	T. van der Zee	Liberal Union	269	4.53		
Deventer	Valid votes		5,941	99.18	5,504	99.39
Deventer	Invalid/blank votes		49	0.82	34	0.61
Deventer	Total votes		5,990	100	5,538	100
Deventer	Registered voters/turnout		6,697	89.44	6,697	82.69
Doetinchem	H. F. Hesselink van Suchtelen	Liberal Union	3,119	40.41	3,962	50.99
Doetinchem	H. A. Pauwen	Catholic	2,380	30.83	3,808	49.01
Doetinchem	M. A. Brants	Anti-Revolutionary Party	1,807	23.41		
Doetinchem	W. H. E. van der Borch van Verwolde	Independent	413	5.35		
Doetinchem	Valid votes		7,719	98.37	7,770	98.68
Doetinchem	Invalid/blank votes		128	1.63	104	1.32
Doetinchem	Total votes		7,847	100	7,874	100
Doetinchem	Registered voters/turnout		8,470	92.64	8,470	92.96
Dokkum	H. Pollema	Anti-Revolutionary Party	1,969	48.65	2,304	48.79
Dokkum	E. Schaafsma	Liberal Union	1,650	40.77	2,418	51.21
Dokkum	O. Q. van Swinderen	Christian Historical Voters' League	225	5.56		
Dokkum	J. Doornbosch	Liberal Protectionist	203	5.02		
Dokkum	Valid votes		4,047	98.85	4,722	99.52
Dokkum	Invalid/blank votes		47	1.15	23	0.48
Dokkum	Total votes		4,094	100	4,745	100
Dokkum	Registered voters/turnout		5,279	77.55	5,279	89.88
Dordrecht	J. M. Rens	Anti-Revolutionary Party	1,839	47.09	2,166	48.54
Dordrecht	S. M. H. van Gijn	Liberal Union	1,531	39.21	2,296	51.46
Dordrecht	H. J. Smidt	Liberal Union	535	13.70		
Dordrecht	Valid votes		3,905	98.24	4,462	98.80
Dordrecht	Invalid/blank votes		70	1.76	54	1.20
Dordrecht	Total votes		3,975	100	4,516	100
Dordrecht	Registered voters/turnout		5,012	79.31	5,012	90.10
Druten	J. A. N. Travaglino	Catholic	2,841	68.84		
Druten	J. D. Six	Christian Historical Voters' League	1,154	27.96		
Druten	H. J. A. M. Schaepman	Catholic	132	3.20		
Druten	Valid votes		4,127	98.15		
Druten	Invalid/blank votes		78	1.85		
Druten	Total votes		4,205	100		
Druten	Registered voters/turnout		5,783	72.71		
Ede	L. H. J. M. van Asch van Wijck	Anti-Revolutionary Party	2,744	60.69		
Ede	A. W. J. J. baron van Nagell	Liberal Union	1,245	27.54		
Ede	A. W. van Borssele	Free Liberals	532	11.77		
Ede	Valid votes		4,521	98.41		
Ede	Invalid/blank votes		73	1.59		
Ede	Total votes		4,594	100		
Ede	Registered voters/turnout		5,769	79.63		
Eindhoven	J. T. M. Smits van Oyen	Catholic	Unopposed			
Elst	W. H. J. T. van Basten van Batenburg	Catholic	3,486	54.81		
Elst	P. Rink	Liberal Union	1,337	21.02		
Elst	A. D. Duys	Anti-Revolutionary Party	1,253	19.70		
Elst	F. F. baron van Lynden van Hemmen	Christian Historical Voters' League	284	4.47		
Elst	Valid votes		6,360	98.16		
Elst	Invalid/blank votes		119	1.84		
Elst	Total votes		6,479	100		
Elst	Registered voters/turnout		7,053	91.86		
Emmen	P. H. Roessingh	Liberal Union	2,769	79.34		
Emmen	M. H. A. van der Valk	Anti-Revolutionary Party	721	20.66		
Emmen	Valid votes		3,490	99.23		
Emmen	Invalid/blank votes		27	0.77		
Emmen	Total votes		3,517	100		
Emmen	Registered voters/turnout		5,848	60.14		
Enkhuizen	J. Zijp	Liberal Union	3,528	50.05		
Enkhuizen	H. Raat II	Independent	2,710	38.45		
Enkhuizen	N. Sluis Pzn.	Anti-Revolutionary Party	629	8.92		
Enkhuizen	P. Nolting	Radical League	98	1.39		
Enkhuizen	H. de Boer	Liberal Protectionist	84	1.19		
Enkhuizen	Valid votes		7,049	99.09		
Enkhuizen	Invalid/blank votes		65	0.91		
Enkhuizen	Total votes		7,114	100		
Enkhuizen	Registered voters/turnout		7,766	91.60		
Enschede	A. F. Vos de Wael	Catholic	3,475	42.62	3,929	46.40
Enschede	N. G. Pierson	Liberal Union	2,454	30.10	4,539	53.60
Enschede	H. H. van Kol	Social Democratic Workers' Party	1,337	16.40		
Enschede	J. D. Six	Christian Historical Voters' League	473	5.80		
Enschede	J. van Alphen	Anti-Revolutionary Party	414	5.08		
Enschede	Valid votes		8,153	99.62	8,468	99.72
Enschede	Invalid/blank votes		31	0.38	24	0.28
Enschede	Total votes		8,184	100	8,492	100
Enschede	Registered voters/turnout		8,778	93.23	8,778	96.74
Franeker	F. Lieftinck	Liberal Union	1,273	34.58	2,476	55.80
Franeker	H. Kamstra	Anti-Revolutionary Party	1,098	29.83	1,961	44.20
Franeker	Z. Middelkoop	Radical League	778	21.14		
Franeker	L. W. de Vries	Free Anti Revolutionary Party	532	14.45		
Franeker	Valid votes		3,681	96.31	4,437	98.95
Franeker	Invalid/blank votes		141	3.69	47	1.05
Franeker	Total votes		3,822	100	4,484	100
Franeker	Registered voters/turnout		5,651	67.63	5,651	79.35
Goes	A. F. de Savornin Lohman	Free Anti Revolutionary Party	2,671	62.57		
Goes	J. H. C. Heijse	Liberal Union	1,598	37.43		
Goes	Valid votes		4,269	99.00		
Goes	Invalid/blank votes		43	1.00		
Goes	Total votes		4,312	100		
Goes	Registered voters/turnout		6,225	69.27		
Gorinchem	H. Seret	Anti-Revolutionary Party	2,511	52.99		
Gorinchem	N. G. Pierson	Liberal Union	1,987	41.93		
Gorinchem	G. van Herwaarden	Christian Historical Voters' League	241	5.09		
Gorinchem	Valid votes		4,739	98.10		
Gorinchem	Invalid/blank votes		92	1.90		
Gorinchem	Total votes		4,831	100		
Gorinchem	Registered voters/turnout		6,271	77.04		
Gouda	L. F. Duymaer van Twist	Anti-Revolutionary Party	2,084	46.57	2,554	49.71
Gouda	C. J. E. graaf van Bylandt	Free Liberals	1,249	27.91	2,584	50.29
Gouda	D. de Klerk	Liberal Union	495	11.06		
Gouda	P. van der Hoog	Liberal Union	291	6.50		
Gouda	O. J. E. baron van Wassenaer van Catwijck	Free Anti Revolutionary Party	279	6.23		
Gouda	J. T. de Visser	Christian Historical Voters' League	77	1.72		
Gouda	Valid votes		4,475	99.11	5,138	99.40
Gouda	Invalid/blank votes		40	0.89	31	0.60
Gouda	Total votes		4,515	100	5,169	100
Gouda	Registered voters/turnout		5,728	78.82	5,728	90.24
Grave	J. J. I. Harte van Tecklenburg	Catholic	Unopposed			
Groningen	H. L. Drucker	Liberal Union	1,709	39.61	2,651	60.89
Groningen	S. van Houten	Free Liberals	1,024	23.73	1,703	39.11
Groningen	A. Brummelkamp Jr.	Anti-Revolutionary Party	1,005	23.29		
Groningen	J. Domela Nieuwenhuis	Christian Historical Voters' League	362	8.39		
Groningen	F. van der Goes	Social Democratic Workers' Party	215	4.98		
Groningen	Valid votes		4,315	97.21	4,354	98.44
Groningen	Invalid/blank votes		124	2.79	69	1.56
Groningen	Total votes		4,439	100	4,423	100
Groningen	Registered voters/turnout		5,630	78.85	5,630	78.56
Gulpen	J. M. M. H. Merkelbach	Catholic	1,828	51.15		
Gulpen	L. H. W. Regout	Catholic	1,552	43.42		
Gulpen	A. P. E. A. Wijnans	Catholic	194	5.43		
Gulpen	Valid votes		3,574	98.70		
Gulpen	Invalid/blank votes		47	1.30		
Gulpen	Total votes		3,621	100		
Gulpen	Registered voters/turnout		5,287	68.49		
Haarlem	A. J. Rethaan Macaré	Liberal Union	2,295	58.80		
Haarlem	H. J. A. M. Schaepman	Catholic	1,206	30.90		
Haarlem	A. E. van Roijen	Anti-Revolutionary Party	246	6.30		
Haarlem	T. Vallentgoed	Radical League	156	4.00		
Haarlem	Valid votes		3,903	98.99		
Haarlem	Invalid/blank votes		40	1.01		
Haarlem	Total votes		3,943	100		
Haarlem	Registered voters/turnout		4,791	82.30		
Haarlemmermeer	F. J. M. A. Reekers	Catholic	2,940	43.01	3,159	46.39
Haarlemmermeer	G. B. 't Hooft	Anti-Revolutionary Party	1,950	28.53	3,651	53.61
Haarlemmermeer	G. C. Everwijn Lange	Liberal Union	1,532	22.41		
Haarlemmermeer	F. R. Crommelin	Christian Historical Voters' League	414	6.06		
Haarlemmermeer	Valid votes		6,836	98.02	6,810	98.98
Haarlemmermeer	Invalid/blank votes		138	1.98	70	1.02
Haarlemmermeer	Total votes		6,974	100	6,880	100
Haarlemmermeer	Registered voters/turnout		7,971	87.49	7,971	86.31
Harlingen	T. A. J. van Asch van Wijck	Anti-Revolutionary Party	1,758	40.52	2,251	47.66
Harlingen	A. Bouman	Liberal Union	1,019	23.48	2,472	52.34
Harlingen	J. T. de Visser	Christian Historical Voters' League	999	23.02		
Harlingen	W. P. Zeilmaker	Radical League	563	12.98		
Harlingen	Valid votes		4,339	97.24	4,723	98.70
Harlingen	Invalid/blank votes		123	2.76	62	1.30
Harlingen	Total votes		4,462	100	4,785	100
Harlingen	Registered voters/turnout		5,679	78.57	5,679	84.26
Helmond	P. J. F. Vermeulen	Catholic	Unopposed			
Hilversum	S. baron van Heemstra II	Anti-Revolutionary Party	3,003	50.32		
Hilversum	J. H. J. Quarles van Ufford	Independent	1,545	25.89		
Hilversum	J. Baron	Liberal Union	1,420	23.79		
Hilversum	Valid votes		5,968	96.85		
Hilversum	Invalid/blank votes		194	3.15		
Hilversum	Total votes		6,162	100		
Hilversum	Registered voters/turnout		7,597	81.11		
Hontenisse	F. J. F. M. Walter	Catholic	2,264	43.44	2,424	47.50
Hontenisse	J. G. van Deinse	Liberal Union	1,530	29.36	2,679	52.50
Hontenisse	J. J. Pompe van Meerdervoort	Anti-Revolutionary Party	1,418	27.21		
Hontenisse	Valid votes		5,212	98.86	5,103	99.03
Hontenisse	Invalid/blank votes		60	1.14	50	0.97
Hontenisse	Total votes		5,272	100	5,153	100
Hontenisse	Registered voters/turnout		5,976	88.22	5,976	86.23
Hoogezand	J. D. Veegens	Liberal Union	1,705	46.22	2,800	63.72
Hoogezand	A. Wiersinga	Anti-Revolutionary Party	1,380	37.41	1,594	36.28
Hoogezand	W. H. Vliegen	Social Democratic Workers' Party	380	10.30		
Hoogezand	D. R. Mansholt	Radical League	224	6.07		
Hoogezand	Valid votes		3,689	97.80	4,394	99.08
Hoogezand	Invalid/blank votes		83	2.20	41	0.92
Hoogezand	Total votes		3,772	100	4,435	100
Hoogezand	Registered voters/turnout		5,334	70.72	5,334	83.15
Hoorn	P. B. J. Ferf	Liberal Union	3,876	66.70		
Hoorn	F. J. M. A. Reekers	Catholic	1,558	26.81		
Hoorn	N. Oosterbaan	Anti-Revolutionary Party	325	5.59		
Hoorn	J. W. G. Boreel van Hogelanden	Christian Historical Voters' League	52	0.89		
Hoorn	Valid votes		5,811	98.14		
Hoorn	Invalid/blank votes		110	1.86		
Hoorn	Total votes		5,921	100		
Hoorn	Registered voters/turnout		6,621	89.43		
Kampen	Æ. baron van Mackay II	Anti-Revolutionary Party	2,294	53.30		
Kampen	B. Cuperus	Liberal Union	1,246	28.95		
Kampen	A. L. van Hasselt	Christian Historical Voters' League	764	17.75		
Kampen	Valid votes		4,304	98.58		
Kampen	Invalid/blank votes		62	1.42		
Kampen	Total votes		4,366	100		
Kampen	Registered voters/turnout		5,778	75.56		
Katwijk	J. W. J. C. M. van Nispen tot Sevenaer	Catholic	2,297	43.82	2,359	46.42
Katwijk	J. H. Donner	Anti-Revolutionary Party	2,012	38.38	2,723	53.58
Katwijk	M. van den Brandeler	Christian Historical Voters' League	933	17.80		
Katwijk	Valid votes		5,242	99.30	5,082	98.87
Katwijk	Invalid/blank votes		37	0.70	58	1.13
Katwijk	Total votes		5,279	100	5,140	100
Katwijk	Registered voters/turnout		5,728	92.16	5,728	89.73
Leeuwarden	C. V. Gerritsen	Radical League	1,213	30.71	1,803	49.06
Leeuwarden	P. J. Troelstra	Social Democratic Workers' Party	939	23.77	1,872	50.94
Leeuwarden	E. B. Kielstra	Liberal Union	713	18.05		
Leeuwarden	W. C. van Munster	Anti-Revolutionary Party	580	14.68		
Leeuwarden	J. F. H. Bekhuis	Catholic	505	12.78		
Leeuwarden	Valid votes		3,950	99.20	3,675	97.07
Leeuwarden	Invalid/blank votes		32	0.80	111	2.93
Leeuwarden	Total votes		3,982	100	3,786	100
Leeuwarden	Registered voters/turnout		5,366	74.21	5,366	70.56
Leiden	A. E. van Kempen	Anti-Revolutionary Party	2,029	50.76		
Leiden	H. L. Drucker	Liberal Union	1,772	44.33		
Leiden	O. J. H. graaf van Limburg Stirum	Christian Historical Voters' League	196	4.90		
Leiden	Valid votes		3,997	98.86		
Leiden	Invalid/blank votes		46	1.14		
Leiden	Total votes		4,043	100		
Leiden	Registered voters/turnout		4,523	89.39		
Lochem	C. Lely	Liberal Union	3,886	59.48		
Lochem	G. J. ten Cate	Anti-Revolutionary Party	2,441	37.36		
Lochem	A. L. van Hasselt	Christian Historical Voters' League	206	3.15		
Lochem	Valid votes		6,533	100.00		
Lochem	Invalid/blank votes		0	0.00		
Lochem	Total votes		6,533	100		
Lochem	Registered voters/turnout		7,048	92.69		
Loosduinen	A. H. M. van Berckel	Catholic	2,260	38.10	2,411	44.42
Loosduinen	A. Brummelkamp Jr.	Anti-Revolutionary Party	1,603	27.02	3,017	55.58
Loosduinen	J. M. Pijnacker Hordijk	Liberal Union	1,261	21.26		
Loosduinen	G. van Herwaarden	Christian Historical Voters' League	808	13.62		
Loosduinen	Valid votes		5,932	98.67	5,428	98.51
Loosduinen	Invalid/blank votes		80	1.33	82	1.49
Loosduinen	Total votes		6,012	100	5,510	100
Loosduinen	Registered voters/turnout		6,762	88.91	6,762	81.48
Maastricht	M. de Ras	Catholic	1,785	65.92		
Maastricht	G. A. A. Tripels	Liberal Union	600	22.16		
Maastricht	W. H. Vliegen	Social Democratic Workers' Party	323	11.93		
Maastricht	Valid votes		2,708	97.66		
Maastricht	Invalid/blank votes		65	2.34		
Maastricht	Total votes		2,773	100		
Maastricht	Registered voters/turnout		4,073	68.08		
Meppel	H. Smeenge	Liberal Union	2,253	53.28		
Meppel	A. Wiersinga	Anti-Revolutionary Party	1,207	28.54		
Meppel	A. ten Klooster	Christian Historical Voters' League	682	16.13		
Meppel	H. J. van de Vegt	Independent	50	1.18		
Meppel	J. Bosch Bruist	Liberal Protectionist	37	0.87		
Meppel	Valid votes		4,229	97.74		
Meppel	Invalid/blank votes		98	2.26		
Meppel	Total votes		4,327	100		
Meppel	Registered voters/turnout		5,327	81.23		
Middelburg	C. Lucasse	Anti-Revolutionary Party	2,672	44.83	3,137	50.11
Middelburg	E. Fokker	Liberal Union	2,243	37.63	3,123	49.89
Middelburg	E. L. baron van Hardenbroek	Independent	856	14.36		
Middelburg	A. P. C. van Karnebeek	Free Liberals	177	2.97		
Middelburg	G. T. W. Kotte	Social Democratic Workers' Party	12	0.20		
Middelburg	Valid votes		5,960	97.05	6,260	98.17
Middelburg	Invalid/blank votes		181	2.95	117	1.83
Middelburg	Total votes		6,141	100	6,377	100
Middelburg	Registered voters/turnout		7,262	84.56	7,262	87.81
Nijmegen	F. T. J. H. Dobbelman	Catholic	2,778	71.32		
Nijmegen	J. de Koning	Liberal Union	1,117	28.68		
Nijmegen	Valid votes		3,895	98.73		
Nijmegen	Invalid/blank votes		50	1.27		
Nijmegen	Total votes		3,945	100		
Nijmegen	Registered voters/turnout		4,904	80.44		
Ommen	J. van Alphen	Anti-Revolutionary Party	2,977	56.51		
Ommen	J. T. de Visser	Christian Historical Voters' League	1,534	29.12		
Ommen	E. E. van Riemsdijk	Liberal Union	757	14.37		
Ommen	Valid votes		5,268	97.85		
Ommen	Invalid/blank votes		116	2.15		
Ommen	Total votes		5,384	100		
Ommen	Registered voters/turnout		6,420	83.86		
Oostburg	P. C. J. Hennequin	Liberal Union	3,241	57.93		
Oostburg	N. Glinderman	Anti-Revolutionary Party	2,197	39.27		
Oostburg	J. Lansen Croin	Liberal Union	157	2.81		
Oostburg	Valid votes		5,595	99.31		
Oostburg	Invalid/blank votes		39	0.69		
Oostburg	Total votes		5,634	100		
Oostburg	Registered voters/turnout		6,355	88.65		
Oosterhout	I. B. D. van den Berch van Heemstede	Catholic	3,335	92.66		
Oosterhout	A. P. R. C. baron van Borch van Verwolde	Anti-Revolutionary Party	264	7.34		
Oosterhout	Valid votes		3,599	98.98		
Oosterhout	Invalid/blank votes		37	1.02		
Oosterhout	Total votes		3,636	100		
Oosterhout	Registered voters/turnout		6,175	58.88		
Rheden	M. J. C. M. Kolkman	Catholic	3,136	63.56		
Rheden	P. van Vliet	Anti-Revolutionary Party	1,152	23.35		
Rheden	C. W. Vrijland	Liberal Union	646	13.09		
Rheden	Valid votes		4,934	96.86		
Rheden	Invalid/blank votes		160	3.14		
Rheden	Total votes		5,094	100		
Rheden	Registered voters/turnout		6,417	79.38		
Ridderkerk	G. J. Goekoop	Liberal Union	1,801	48.56	2,034	49.73
Ridderkerk	A. P. R. C. baron van Borch van Verwolde	Anti-Revolutionary Party	1,709	46.08	2,056	50.27
Ridderkerk	A. D. van Assendelft de Coningh	Liberal Protectionist	199	5.37		
Ridderkerk	Valid votes		3,709	99.49	4,090	99.68
Ridderkerk	Invalid/blank votes		19	0.51	13	0.32
Ridderkerk	Total votes		3,728	100	4,103	100
Ridderkerk	Registered voters/turnout		4,547	81.99	4,547	90.24
Roermond	W. Everts	Catholic	Unopposed			
Rotterdam I	R. P. Mees R. Az.	Liberal Union	1,066	40.42	1,298	47.06
Rotterdam I	J. T. de Visser	Christian Historical Voters' League	671	25.45	1,460	52.94
Rotterdam I	T. Tromp	Anti-Revolutionary Party	516	19.57		
Rotterdam I	J. Maschek	Catholic	314	11.91		
Rotterdam I	L. Goudswaard	Social Democratic Workers' Party	70	2.65		
Rotterdam I	Valid votes		2,637	98.65	2,758	99.32
Rotterdam I	Invalid/blank votes		36	1.35	19	0.68
Rotterdam I	Total votes		2,673	100	2,777	100
Rotterdam I	Registered voters/turnout		3,208	83.32	3,208	86.56
Rotterdam II	D. de Klerk	Liberal Union	1,135	41.00	1,649	58.00
Rotterdam II	T. A. J. van Asch van Wijck	Anti-Revolutionary Party	582	21.03	1,194	42.00
Rotterdam II	J. T. de Visser	Christian Historical Voters' League	543	19.62		
Rotterdam II	H. J. A. M. Schaepman	Catholic	425	15.35		
Rotterdam II	J. G. van Kuykhof	Social Democratic Workers' Party	83	3.00		
Rotterdam II	Valid votes		2,768	99.35	2,843	98.61
Rotterdam II	Invalid/blank votes		18	0.65	40	1.39
Rotterdam II	Total votes		2,786	100	2,883	100
Rotterdam II	Registered voters/turnout		3,394	82.09	3,394	84.94
Rotterdam III	J. B. Verhey	Liberal Union	1,243	48.29	1,798	66.03
Rotterdam III	H. J. A. M. Schaepman	Catholic	751	29.18	925	33.97
Rotterdam III	G. van Herwaarden	Christian Historical Voters' League	314	12.20		
Rotterdam III	P. van der Pols	Anti-Revolutionary Party	178	6.92		
Rotterdam III	J. L. Stern	Liberal Union	44	1.71		
Rotterdam III	T. de Rot	Radical League	44	1.71		
Rotterdam III	Valid votes		2,574	99.11	2,723	99.20
Rotterdam III	Invalid/blank votes		23	0.89	22	0.80
Rotterdam III	Total votes		2,597	100	2,745	100
Rotterdam III	Registered voters/turnout		3,222	80.60	3,222	85.20
Rotterdam IV	G. H. Hintzen	Liberal Union	1,511	46.88	1,980	59.37
Rotterdam IV	W. B. van Staveren	Anti-Revolutionary Party	1,166	36.18	1,355	40.63
Rotterdam IV	J. T. de Visser	Christian Historical Voters' League	448	13.90		
Rotterdam IV	W. P. G. Helsdingen	Social Democratic Workers' Party	98	3.04		
Rotterdam IV	Valid votes		3,223	98.87	3,335	99.05
Rotterdam IV	Invalid/blank votes		37	1.13	32	0.95
Rotterdam IV	Total votes		3,260	100	3,367	100
Rotterdam IV	Registered voters/turnout		3,839	84.92	3,839	87.71
Rotterdam V	E. E. van Raalte	Liberal Union	1,321	49.79	1,862	68.51
Rotterdam V	J. Maschek	Catholic	561	21.15	856	31.49
Rotterdam V	G. van Herwaarden	Christian Historical Voters' League	387	14.59		
Rotterdam V	K. Kater	Anti-Revolutionary Party	323	12.17		
Rotterdam V	F. van der Goes	Social Democratic Workers' Party	61	2.30		
Rotterdam V	Valid votes		2,653	98.85	2,718	98.91
Rotterdam V	Invalid/blank votes		31	1.15	30	1.09
Rotterdam V	Total votes		2,684	100	2,748	100
Rotterdam V	Registered voters/turnout		3,355	80.00	3,355	81.91
Schiedam	O. J. H. graaf van Limburg Stirum	Christian Historical Voters' League	3,050	58.13		
Schiedam	J. P. R. Tak van Poortvliet	Liberal Union	1,395	26.59		
Schiedam	A. W. F. Idenburg	Anti-Revolutionary Party	802	15.28		
Schiedam	Valid votes		5,247	98.76		
Schiedam	Invalid/blank votes		66	1.24		
Schiedam	Total votes		5,313	100		
Schiedam	Registered voters/turnout		6,224	85.36		
Schoterland	G. L. van der Zwaag	Social Democratic Workers' Party	1,344	39.15	1,941	54.04
Schoterland	H. Pyttersen	Liberal Union	994	28.95	1,651	45.96
Schoterland	A. Kuyper	Anti-Revolutionary Party	861	25.08		
Schoterland	H. Verkouteren	Christian Historical Voters' League	234	6.82		
Schoterland	Valid votes		3,433	98.23	3,592	98.93
Schoterland	Invalid/blank votes		62	1.77	39	1.07
Schoterland	Total votes		3,495	100	3,631	100
Schoterland	Registered voters/turnout		5,584	62.59	5,584	65.03
Sittard	C. C. M. H. baron van Bieberstein Rogalla Zawadsky	Catholic	2,240	88.47		
Sittard	A. Kamps	Catholic	292	11.53		
Sittard	Valid votes		2,532	98.25		
Sittard	Invalid/blank votes		45	1.75		
Sittard	Total votes		2,577	100		
Sittard	Registered voters/turnout		6,018	42.82		
Sliedrecht	A. Kuyper	Anti-Revolutionary Party	2,409	55.20		
Sliedrecht	C. B. Wisboom	Liberal Union	1,005	23.03		
Sliedrecht	G. van Herwaarden	Christian Historical Voters' League	950	21.77		
Sliedrecht	Valid votes		4,364	97.63		
Sliedrecht	Invalid/blank votes		106	2.37		
Sliedrecht	Total votes		4,470	100		
Sliedrecht	Registered voters/turnout		6,121	73.03		
Sneek	Th. Heemskerk	Anti-Revolutionary Party	1,890	41.83	2,451	49.99
Sneek	J. A. van Gilse	Liberal Union	1,423	31.50	2,452	50.01
Sneek	W. Kroese	Christian Historical Voters' League	1,205	26.67		
Sneek	Valid votes		4,518	98.73	4,903	99.15
Sneek	Invalid/blank votes		58	1.27	42	0.85
Sneek	Total votes		4,576	100	4,945	100
Sneek	Registered voters/turnout		6,122	74.75	6,122	80.77
Steenwijk	J. Meesters II	Liberal Union	1,575	38.72	2,389	52.98
Steenwijk	A. P. R. C. baron van Borch van Verwolde	Anti-Revolutionary Party	1,469	36.11	2,120	47.02
Steenwijk	J. G. van der Hoop	Christian Historical Voters' League	741	18.22		
Steenwijk	J. Bosch Bruist	Liberal Union	283	6.96		
Steenwijk	Valid votes		4,068	98.83	4,509	99.03
Steenwijk	Invalid/blank votes		48	1.17	44	0.97
Steenwijk	Total votes		4,116	100	4,553	100
Steenwijk	Registered voters/turnout		5,863	70.20	5,863	77.66
Tiel	M. Tydeman Jr.	Free Liberals	3,121	64.98		
Tiel	W. K. F. P. graaf van Bylandt	Free Anti Revolutionary Party	1,241	25.84		
Tiel	F. Mol	Radical League	441	9.18		
Tiel	Valid votes		4,803	98.26		
Tiel	Invalid/blank votes		85	1.74		
Tiel	Total votes		4,888	100		
Tiel	Registered voters/turnout		5,903	82.81		
Tietjerksteradeel	J. D. de Vries	Anti-Revolutionary Party	1,867	43.93	2,432	47.65
Tietjerksteradeel	P. J. Troelstra	Social Democratic Workers' Party	1,149	27.04	2,672	52.35
Tietjerksteradeel	H. P. de Kanter	Liberal Union	842	19.81		
Tietjerksteradeel	L. W. de Vries	Free Anti Revolutionary Party	392	9.22		
Tietjerksteradeel	Valid votes		4,250	99.28	5,104	99.03
Tietjerksteradeel	Invalid/blank votes		31	0.72	50	0.97
Tietjerksteradeel	Total votes		4,281	100	5,154	100
Tietjerksteradeel	Registered voters/turnout		5,968	71.73	5,968	86.36
Tilburg	B. M. Bahlmann	Catholic	2,594	60.64		
Tilburg	A. H. A. Arts	Catholic	1,684	39.36		
Tilburg	Valid votes		4,278	97.45		
Tilburg	Invalid/blank votes		112	2.55		
Tilburg	Total votes		4,390	100		
Tilburg	Registered voters/turnout		5,203	84.37		
Utrecht I	N. de Ridder	Anti-Revolutionary Party	1,784	38.67	2,020	41.35
Utrecht I	A. P. C. van Karnebeek	Free Liberals	1,100	23.85	2,865	58.65
Utrecht I	H. A. van Beuningen	Liberal Union	990	21.46		
Utrecht I	P. J. Troelstra	Social Democratic Workers' Party	442	9.58		
Utrecht I	A. Kerdijk	Liberal Union	297	6.44		
Utrecht I	Valid votes		4,613	98.44	4,885	99.19
Utrecht I	Invalid/blank votes		73	1.56	40	0.81
Utrecht I	Total votes		4,686	100	4,925	100
Utrecht I	Registered voters/turnout		5,535	84.66	5,535	88.98
Utrecht II	J. W. Bergansius	Catholic	1,144	33.48	1,538	42.54
Utrecht II	J. N. Bastert	Free Liberals	840	24.58	2,077	57.46
Utrecht II	A. L. W. Seijffardt	Liberal Union	593	17.35		
Utrecht II	P. J. Troelstra	Social Democratic Workers' Party	444	12.99		
Utrecht II	A. Brummelkamp Jr.	Anti-Revolutionary Party	396	11.59		
Utrecht II	Valid votes		3,417	98.30	3,615	98.80
Utrecht II	Invalid/blank votes		59	1.70	44	1.20
Utrecht II	Total votes		3,476	100	3,659	100
Utrecht II	Registered voters/turnout		4,142	83.92	4,142	88.34
Veendam	E. A. Smidt	Liberal Union	2,325	51.96		
Veendam	M. H. A. van der Valk	Anti-Revolutionary Party	1,467	32.78		
Veendam	W. P. G. Helsdingen	Social Democratic Workers' Party	465	10.39		
Veendam	D. R. Mansholt	Radical League	218	4.87		
Veendam	Valid votes		4,475	97.47		
Veendam	Invalid/blank votes		116	2.53		
Veendam	Total votes		4,591	100		
Veendam	Registered voters/turnout		6,320	72.64		
Veghel	B. R. F. van Vlijmen	Catholic	Unopposed			
Venlo	W. H. Nolens	Catholic	Unopposed			
Waalwijk	W. P. A. Mutsaers	Catholic	3,376	84.34		
Waalwijk	A. P. R. C. baron van Borch van Verwolde	Anti-Revolutionary Party	627	15.66		
Waalwijk	Valid votes		4,003	98.35		
Waalwijk	Invalid/blank votes		67	1.65		
Waalwijk	Total votes		4,070	100		
Waalwijk	Registered voters/turnout		6,144	66.24		
Weert	P. J. Truijen	Catholic	Unopposed			
Weststellingwerf	W. M. Houwing	Liberal Union	1,409	46.18	2,174	60.76
Weststellingwerf	P. van Vliet	Anti-Revolutionary Party	948	31.07	1,404	39.24
Weststellingwerf	G. L. van der Zwaag	Social Democratic Workers' Party	694	22.75		
Weststellingwerf	Valid votes		3,051	98.36	3,578	99.20
Weststellingwerf	Invalid/blank votes		51	1.64	29	0.80
Weststellingwerf	Total votes		3,102	100	3,607	100
Weststellingwerf	Registered voters/turnout		5,456	56.85	5,456	66.11
Wijk bij Duurstede	H. M. J. van Asch van Wijck	Anti-Revolutionary Party	3,517	59.14		
Wijk bij Duurstede	W. H. de Beaufort	Free Liberals	1,993	33.51		
Wijk bij Duurstede	H. Verkouteren	Christian Historical Voters' League	292	4.91		
Wijk bij Duurstede	C. V. Gerritsen	Radical League	145	2.44		
Wijk bij Duurstede	Valid votes		5,947	98.04		
Wijk bij Duurstede	Invalid/blank votes		119	1.96		
Wijk bij Duurstede	Total votes		6,066	100		
Wijk bij Duurstede	Registered voters/turnout		6,936	87.46		
Winschoten	D. Bos	Liberal Union	1,415	33.05	1,606	41.37
Winschoten	P. J. Troelstra	Social Democratic Workers' Party	1,216	28.40	2,276	58.63
Winschoten	B. L. Tijdens	Radical League	1,032	24.11		
Winschoten	A. Wiersinga	Anti-Revolutionary Party	618	14.44		
Winschoten	Valid votes		4,281	98.60	3,882	100.00
Winschoten	Invalid/blank votes		61	1.40	0	0.00
Winschoten	Total votes		4,342	100	3,882	100
Winschoten	Registered voters/turnout		6,090	71.30	6,090	63.74
Zaandam	K. de Boer	Radical League	3,768	65.98		
Zaandam	J. Windhouwer	Anti-Revolutionary Party	1,045	18.30		
Zaandam	G. C. Kamphuis	Catholic	657	11.50		
Zaandam	H. Verkouteren	Christian Historical Voters' League	241	4.22		
Zaandam	Valid votes		5,711	97.21		
Zaandam	Invalid/blank votes		164	2.79		
Zaandam	Total votes		5,875	100		
Zaandam	Registered voters/turnout		7,524	78.08		
Zevenbergen	E. A. M. van der Kun	Catholic	3,234	69.27		
Zevenbergen	W. A. E. van der Borch	Independent	835	17.88		
Zevenbergen	A. P. R. C. baron van Borch van Verwolde	Anti-Revolutionary Party	600	12.85		
Zevenbergen	Valid votes		4,669	98.59		
Zevenbergen	Invalid/blank votes		67	1.41		
Zevenbergen	Total votes		4,736	100		
Zevenbergen	Registered voters/turnout		6,414	73.84		
Zierikzee	J. J. van Kerkwijk	Liberal Union	3,404	63.66		
Zierikzee	Th. Heemskerk	Anti-Revolutionary Party	1,943	36.34		
Zierikzee	Valid votes		5,347	99.26		
Zierikzee	Invalid/blank votes		40	0.74		
Zierikzee	Total votes		5,387	100		
Zierikzee	Registered voters/turnout		6,315	85.30		
Zuidhorn	A. Kuyper	Anti-Revolutionary Party	2,019	44.17	2,314	43.37
Zuidhorn	G. Zijlma	Liberal Union	1,373	30.04	3,022	56.63
Zuidhorn	R. Boonstra	Liberal Union	971	21.24		
Zuidhorn	W. P. G. Helsdingen	Social Democratic Workers' Party	208	4.55		
Zuidhorn	Valid votes		4,571	97.50	5,336	98.60
Zuidhorn	Invalid/blank votes		117	2.50	76	1.40
Zuidhorn	Total votes		4,688	100	5,412	100
Zuidhorn	Registered voters/turnout		6,300	74.41	6,300	85.90
Zutphen	H. Goeman Borgesius	Liberal Union	3,283	54.45		
Zutphen	H. W. C. de Jonge	Anti-Revolutionary Party	2,293	38.03		
Zutphen	H. H. van Kol	Social Democratic Workers' Party	291	4.83		
Zutphen	H. Verkouteren	Christian Historical Voters' League	162	2.69		
Zutphen	Valid votes		6,029	98.05		
Zutphen	Invalid/blank votes		120	1.95		
Zutphen	Total votes		6,149	100		
Zutphen	Registered voters/turnout		6,922	88.83		
Zwolle	A. baron van Dedem	Free Anti Revolutionary Party	2,095	44.59	2,551	53.98
Zwolle	J. Hoven	Radical League	1,044	22.22	2,175	46.02
Zwolle	C. baron van Vos van Steenwijk	Free Liberals	814	17.33		
Zwolle	A. Brummelkamp Jr.	Anti-Revolutionary Party	545	11.60		
Zwolle	H. H. van Kol	Social Democratic Workers' Party	200	4.26		
Zwolle	Valid votes		4,698	98.45	4,726	98.50
Zwolle	Invalid/blank votes		74	1.55	72	1.50
Zwolle	Total votes		4,772	100	4,798	100
Zwolle	Registered voters/turnout		6,087	78.40	6,087	78.82
