= Hendrik Goeman Borgesius =

Dutch politician

- Portrait by Hendrik Haverman, 1898

Speaker of the House of Representatives
- In office 18 September 1913 – 18 January 1917
- Preceded by: Octaaf van Nispen tot Sevenaer
- Succeeded by: Dirk Fock

Minister of the Interior
- In office 27 July 1897 – 1 August 1901
- Ministry: Pierson
- Preceded by: Samuel van Houten
- Succeeded by: Abraham Kuyper

Personal details
- Born: 11 January 1847 Schildwolde, Netherlands
- Died: 18 January 1917 (aged 70) The Hague, Netherlands
- Party: Liberal Union
- Spouse: Johanna Bouwina Cannegieter (m. 1869)
- Children: 5
- Education: University of Groningen

Hendrik Goeman Borgesius (11 January 1847 – 18 January 1917) was a Dutch politician who served as Minister of the Interior from 1897 to 1901, and as Speaker of the House of Representatives from 1913 to 1917.

Born to a physician in the rural northern village of Schildwolde, Goeman Borgesius studied law at the University of Groningen, and subsequently worked as a school teacher, first in Sneek, and later in Arnhem. During his time in Arnhem, he started contributing to left-liberal publications and became involved with progressive organisations concerned with the social question. He was elected to the House of Representatives in 1877, where he would remain for the rest of his life, representing respectively Winschoten, Veendam, Zutphen, Enkhuizen, Rotterdam and finally Emmen. In the House, advocated greater state intervention in the economy and the extension of suffrage, and led a succession of progressive liberal parliamentary groups from 1893 onward.

As interior minister in the Pierson ministry from 1897 to 1901, he was responsible for several pieces of social legislation, including on compulsory education, housing and public health, though he was unable to make significant changes with respect to suffrage. After his ministership, he became the leader of the Liberal Union, was involved in the formation of a liberal ministry in 1905, and served as Speaker of the House of Representatives from 17 September 1913 until his death on 18 January 1917.

== Early life ==
Hendrik Goeman Borgesius was born in Schildwolde on 11 January 1847. His father Jacobus Borgesius was a physician like his father before him, while his mother was Grietje Elisabeth Dijkhuizen. Goeman Borgesius attended the Latin boarding school in Ootmarsum and subsequently started studying theology at the University of Groningen, but switched to Roman and contemporary law after a year. He received his doctorate cum laude on 21 September 1868.

After receiving his doctorate, Goeman Borgesius worked as an economics teacher at the hogere burgerschool in Sneek from September 1868 to September 1870, and subsequently as an economics and political science teacher at the hogere burgerschool in Arnhem. While in Arnhem, he started to write contributions to liberal publications such as the Arnhemsche Courant and Het Vaderland, and in November 1871, he became the editor-in-chief of the latter paper. From 1870 onward, he participating in meetings of a committee for the discussion of the social question, where he came into contact with the progressive "young liberals", who sympathised with German historical school of economics. In the same period, he became a member of the editorial team of the left-liberal monthly publication Vragen des Tijds, for which he authored several articles about the social question.

== Early parliamentary tenure ==
In 1877, Goeman Borgesius was first elected to the House of Representatives in a by-election in the district of Winschoten, taking office on 19 November of that year. He simultaneously resigned as editor-in-chief of Het Vaderland at the request editorial team, which did not want the paper to become a mouthpiece of a politician. He did retain his position at the left-liberal monthly publication Vragen des Tijds. Goeman Borgesius would remain in the House for the rest of his life, representing Winschoten (until 1888), Veendam (1888–1891), Zutphen (1891–1905), Enkhuizen (1905–1909), Rotterdam I (1901–1913) and Emmen (1913–1917). Despite his "unattractive voice" and strong northern accent, he was a popular speaker, and was frequently elected in multiple districts, after which he would opt to represent the one in which he won by the narrowest margin.

In the House, he spoke on a variety of subjects, including the interior, suffrage, water management, public health, defence and commerce. He was known as a staunchly anti-clerical liberal who championed neutral public education, but most of his early parliamentary activities concerned the social question. He represented a generation of left-liberals who rejected laissez-faire economics and placed great emphasis on the role of the state and the community in safeguarding the interests of the weak and the disadvantaged. Goeman Borgesius promoted activities of private associations, and was a keen advocate of cooperatives and savings associations for workers. In 1887, Goeman Borgesius was the initiator of a parliamentary inquiry into working conditions in industry, and served as deputy chair of the committee that conducted the hearings. The inquiry's findings were an important source of information on working conditions.

Goeman Borgesius strongly criticised the confessional parties' position in the debates on a constitutional revision in 1887, and voted against Æneas Mackay's 1889 Schools Act. In the same year, five liberal MPs including Goeman Borgesius tabled six private members' bills that included the introduction of an income tax, but these bills were rejected by the confessional majority in parliament, and were withdrawn the following year. Many of the proposed measures, including income tax, were implemented later by finance minister Nicolaas Pierson. Outside parliament, Goeman Borgesius was a member of the board of the Maatschappij tot Nut van 't Algemeen, chaired an organisation opposing alcohol abuse and was involved in initiatives to improve social hygiene.

Goeman Borgesius also had a keen interest in the suffrage issue. In 1893, a bill tabled by interior minister Johannes Tak van Poortvliet that would implement near-universal male suffrage led to a split of the liberal parliamentary group. As an advocate of the extension of suffrage, Goeman Borgesius became the chair of the newly established 24-member "Suffrage Club" in parliament which supported the bill, and continued as the "Progressive Club" after the 1894 general election with thirty members. He attempted in vain to amend a new, more conservative suffrage bill tabled by Tak van Poortvliet's successor Samuel van Houten.

== Ministership ==
After the 1897 general election, Goeman Borgesius became interior minister in the Pierson ministry, serving from 27 July 1897 until 1 August 1901. He was advised by his friends not to take the position, but he chose to accept the invitation as this gave him the opportunity to address a number of social issues through legislation.

In 1900, he managed to have his Compulsory Education Act passed through parliament with great difficulty. This act made education compulsory from the age of five to twelve. His 1901 amendment of the Lower Education Act, prompted by the Compulsory Education Act, also increased salaries of primary school teachers and expanded the financial support provided to municipalities for primary education. He also amended the Municipalities Act in 1900 to grant municipalities the power to introduce a moderately progressive rate in their municipal tax ordinances.

In 1901, Goeman Borgesius drafted the Housing Act along with justice minister Pieter Cort van der Linden, which set requirements on the construction and reconstruction of dwellings, and on decent housing standards. Furthermore, provisions were introduced regarding the declaration of dwellings as unfit for habitation, eviction, closure and demolition of dwellings. Financial support from municipalities and central government for housing improvements became available. The act also established a legal basis for housing associations. In the same year, Goeman Borgesius introduced the Public Health Act, which established an authority that would serve as an advisory body to the government and provided guidance to the civil service. Inspectors and chief inspectors were tasked with monitoring compliance with legislation, including the Housing Act, and local health committees were set up.

In addition, Goeman Borgesius brought about a technical revision of Van Houten's Elections Act with respect to the suffrage question, though his initial plans were severely curtailed by the Council of Ministers as well as the majority in the House of Representatives. By introducing more lenient criteria for eligibility to vote based on factors such as rent, wages and exams, the revision constituted a minor extension of suffrage. Goeman Borgesius faced opposition from his own parliamentary group, now named the Free-thinking Democratic Club, which sought a greater extension of suffrage. This conflict led Goeman Borgesius to remain with the Liberal Union when members of this club established the Free-thinking Democratic League in March 1901.

== Later life ==
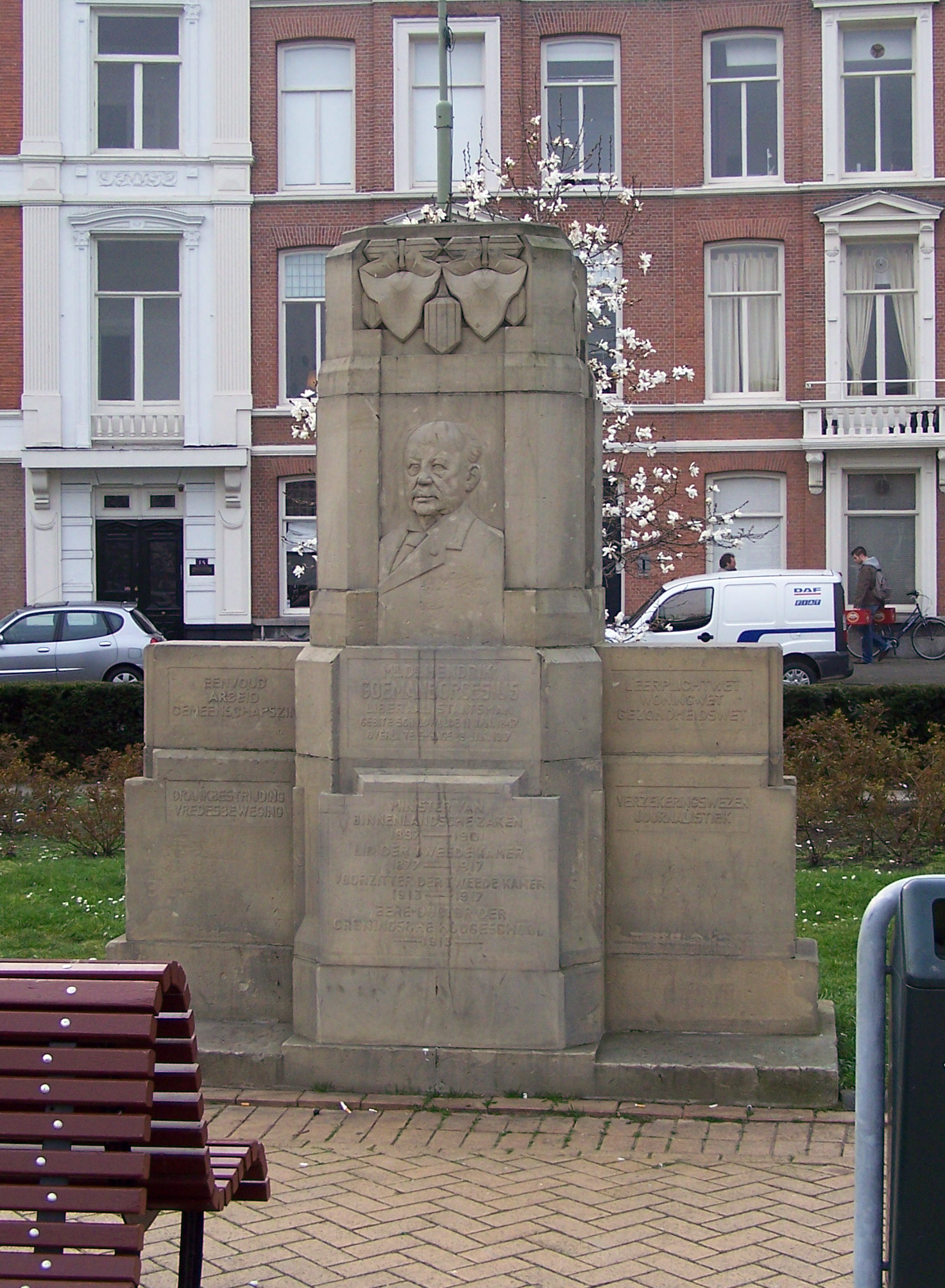
Monument for Goeman Borgesius at the Prins Hendrikplein in The Hague, made by J.C. Altorf in 1924

After his ministership, Goeman Borgesius became parliamentary leader of the Liberal Union, and in 1902 he became chair of the party's board. From this position, he led the opposition to the confessional Kuyper ministry in parliament. Ahead of the 1905 general election, he led the Liberal Union into an electoral alliance with a common programme with the Free-thinking Democratic League. The election result led to the resignation of the Kuyper ministry, after which Goeman Borgesius was appointed formateur, tasked with forming a new ministry. He thought it best not to include in it any individuals who had been involved in the fierce struggles of previous years; for that reason, he opted to stay out of the new ministry himself and remain parliamentary leader. The liberal minority De Meester ministry took office on 17 August 1905.

He remained committed to the extension of suffrage in parliament. In 1911, he tabled a motion declaring the desirability of universal suffrage as well as proportional representation, but this motion was rejected by the confessional majority. Meanwhile, the cooperation between the Liberal Union and the Free-thinking Democratic League developed into the Liberal Concentration in 1912, which also included the more conservative League of Free Liberals. After the 1913 general election, Goeman Borgesius was elected Speaker of the House of Representatives, a position he held until his death. As speaker, he was noted for his frequent slips of the tongue. His work toward improving public health earned him an honorary doctorate in medicine from the University of Groningen on 1 July 1914, the university's 300-year anniversary.

Hendrik Goeman Borgesius died in The Hague on 18 January 1917.

== Private life ==
Goeman Borgesius married Johanna Bouwina Cannegieter on 2 February 1869. The couple had four sons and one daughter. Goeman Borgesius was a member of the Dutch Reformed Church.

House of Representatives of the Netherlands
Preceded by Willem Jonckbloet	Member for Winschoten; 1877–1888; With: Jan de Vos van Steenwijk from 1879	Succeeded by Derk de Ruiter Zijlker
New district	Member for Veendam; 1888–1891	Succeeded by Adriaan Poelman
Preceded by Derck Engelberts	Member for Zutphen; 1891–1905	Succeeded by Franciscus Lieftinck
Preceded by Nanne Sluis	Member for Enkhuizen; 1905–1909	Succeeded by Nicolaas Oosterbaan
Preceded by Samuel van den Bergh	Member for Rotterdam I 1909–1913	Succeeded by Bartholomeus Gerretson
Preceded by Petrus Roessingh	Member for Emmen; 1913–1917	District abolished
Political offices
Preceded by Samuel van Houten	Minister of the Interior; 1897–1901	Succeeded by Abraham Kuyper
Preceded by Octaaf van Nispen tot Sevenaer	Speaker of the House of Representatives; 1913–1917	Succeeded by Dirk Fock
