= Protectionist (disambiguation) =

A protectionist is someone who upholds the economic policy of restraining trade between states.

Protectionist may also refer to:

- Australian Protectionist Party, a current Australian political party
- Liberal Protectionist, a Canadian political party
- Protectionist Party, a historical Australian political party
- Protectionist Party (Sweden), a Swedish political party
- Protectionist (horse), winner of the 2014 Melbourne Cup
