= Results of the 1925 Canadian federal election =

1925 Canadian federal election

== Results by Province and Territory ==
=== Alberta ===
Results in Alberta
Party	Seats	Second	Third	Votes	%	+/-
Conservative	3	5	7	51,102	31.84	
Liberals	4	7	3	44,277	27.59	
Progressive	7	2	1	42,521	26.5	
Labour	0	2	0	9,750	6.08	
United Farmers of Alberta	2	0	0	8,053	5.02	
Labour Farmer	0	0	2	4,774	2.97	
Total	16			160,477	100.0	

=== British Columbia ===
Results in British Columbia
Party	Seats	Second	Third	Votes	%	+/-
Conservative	10	4	0	90,016	49.29	
Liberals	3	8	0	63,374	34.7	
Labour	0	0	5	11,479	6.29	
Progressive	0	2	1	11,078	6.07	
Independent	1	0	0	4,794	2.62	
Socialist	0	0	1	1,888	1.03	
Total	14			182,629	100.0	

=== Manitoba ===
Results in Manitoba
Party	Seats	Second	Third	Votes	%	+/-
Conservative	7	8	1	70,341	41.31	
Progressive	7	3	1	42,748	25.1	
Liberals	1	4	6	34,554	20.29	
Labour	2	0	2	16,424	9.64	
Liberal-Progressive	0	1	0	3,319	1.95	
Independent Labour	0	1	0	2,901	1.7	
Total	17			170,287	100.0	

=== New Brunswick ===
Results in New Brunswick
Party	Seats	Second	Third	Votes	%	+/-
Conservative	10	1	0	90,489	59.67	
Liberals	1	8	1	56,129	37.01	
Independent Liberal Progressive	0	1	0	4,958	3.27	
Independent	0	0	1	84	0.06	
Total	11			151,660	100.0	

=== Nova Scotia ===
Results in Nova Scotia
Party	Seats	Second	Third	Votes	%	+/-
Conservative	11	3	0	125,283	56.43	
Liberals	3	10	1	93,110	41.94	
Labour	0	0	1	3,617	1.63	
Total	14			222,010	100.0	

=== Ontario ===
Results in Ontario
Party	Seats	Second	Third	Fourth	Fifth	Votes	%	+/-
Conservative	67	12	2	0	0	686,478	56.34	
Liberals	12	47	6	0	0	376,363	30.89	
Progressive	2	16	5	0	0	107,561	8.83	
Independent Conservative	1	2	1	1	1	16,759	1.38	
Labour	0	2	3	1	0	14,036	1.15	
Unknown	0	1	1	0	0	11,056	0.91	
Independent	0	1	2	0	0	4,952	0.41	
Farmer-Labour	0	0	1	0	0	762	0.06	
Independent Liberal	0	0	0	1	0	410	0.03	
Total	82					1,218,377	100.0	

=== Prince Edward Island ===
Results in Prince Edward Island
Party	Seats	Second	Third	Votes	%	+/-
Liberals	2	2	0	25,681	51.95	
Conservative	2	1	0	16,357	33.09	
Unknown	0	0	1	7,392	14.95	
Total	4			49,430	100.0	

=== Quebec ===
Results in Quebec
Party	Seats	Second	Third	Fourth	Votes	%	+/-
Liberals	59	5	3	0	476,405	59.55	
Conservative	4	54	1	0	274,744	34.34	
Independent Liberal	1	4	4	0	30,730	3.84	
Liberal Protectionist	0	2	0	0	6,915	0.86	
Independent	1	0	1	1	6,382	0.8	
Unknown	0	0	1	0	1,999	0.25	
Labour	0	0	2	0	1,681	0.21	
Farmer	0	0	1	0	1,130	0.14	
Total	65				799,986	100.0	

=== Saskatchewan ===
Results in Saskatchewan
Party	Seats	Second	Third	Fourth	Votes	%	+/-
Liberals	15	4	0	0	82,283	41.89	
Progressive	6	9	5	0	58,743	29.91	
Conservative	0	7	12	0	49,821	25.36	
Social Credit	0	1	0	0	3,668	1.87	
Independent Progressive	0	0	1	0	1,768	0.9	
Unknown	0	0	0	1	136	0.07	
Total	21				196,419	100.0	

=== Yukon ===
Results in Yukon
Party	Seats	Second	Votes	%	+/-
Conservative	1	0	742	59.36	
Liberals	0	1	508	40.64	
Total	1		1,250	100.0	
