= Radical League =

Defunct political party in the Netherlands

The Radical League (Dutch: Radicale Bond) was a progressive liberal political party in the Netherlands from its founding in 1892 until it merged with the left wing of the Liberal Union to form the Free-thinking Democratic League in 1901.

== History ==
The Radical League originated out of the local progressive liberal caucus "Amsterdam". Leaders of this caucus initiated the formation of a national political party in July 1892, and this resulted in the founding of the Radical League on 9 November 1892. The foremost leader of the new party was the Amsterdam alderman Willem Treub. The party focused on the extension of universal suffrage as well as combating social deprivation.

In 1893, the party won the Leeuwarden seat in a by-election. The newly elected MP was former Amsterdam alderman Carel Victor Gerritsen, who was also the husband of feminist Aletta Jacobs. In 1894 the party won two additional seats. They played a minor role in parliament. In 1897 they won an additional seat. The Radicals supported the progressive liberal Pierson cabinet, although they were not necessary for its majority. On 17 March 1901, the League merged with another group of progressive former Liberal Union members to form the Free-thinking Democratic League.

== Ideology & issues ==
The League was a progressive liberal and radical democratic party, committed to implementation of universal suffrage and social laws. The party was inspired by kathedersocialisme, the progressive politics professed by latitudinarian preachers. It championed democratisation of the political system by abolishing the Senate and the implementation of a referendum. It favoured the nationalisation of crucial industries like the railways.

== Election results ==
This table shows the League's results in elections to the House of Representatives.

Election	Votes	%	Seats	±	Government
1894	5,151	3.12	3 / 100	▲2	Opposition
1897	14,863	3.59	4 / 100	▲1	Supporting the Pierson cabinet

=== Local government ===
The party was particularly strong in Amsterdam. Treub was alderman there.

== Electorate ==
The League's electorate centered on Amsterdam, where intellectuals, journalists, teachers and educated workers supported the party.

== Pillarisation ==
The small and localised Radical League lacked a system of pillarised organisations around it. The weekly magazine De Amsterdammer ("The Amsterdammer") sympathised with the party however.

== See also ==
- Radicalism (historical)
- Liberalism in the Netherlands
