= Jan Loeff =

Dutch politician (1858–1921)

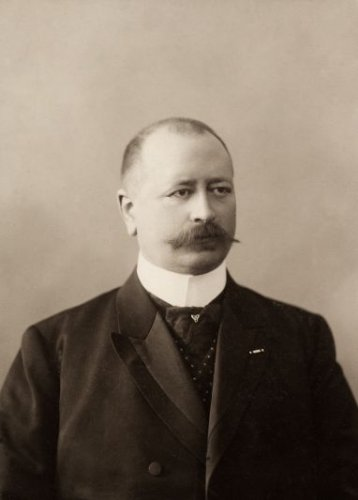
- Jan Loeff in 1913

Minister of Justice
- In office 1 August 1901 – 17 August 1905
- Prime Minister: Abraham Kuyper
- Preceded by: Pieter Cort van der Linden
- Succeeded by: Eduard Ellis van Raalte

Member of the House of Representatives
- In office 5 May 1896 – 1 August 1901
- Preceded by: Pierre Guillaume Jean van der Schrieck
- Succeeded by: Alexander van Sasse van Ysselt
- Constituency: Den Bosch
- In office 19 September 1905 – 14 January 1920
- Preceded by: Willem Mutsaers
- Succeeded by: seat abolished
- Constituency: Waalwijk

Member of the Provincial Council of North Brabant
- In office 3 July 1889 – 1 August 1901

Personal details
- Born: Johannes Alouisius Loeff; 15 November 1858 Baardwijk, Netherlands
- Died: 10 July 1921 (aged 62) The Hague, Netherlands
- Party: Roman Catholic (Bahlmannian); General League
- Spouse: Maria Catharina Josepha Sweens (m. 1891)
- Children: 10
- Education: Leiden University

Johannes Alouisius "Jan" Loeff (15 November 1858 – 10 July 1921) was a Dutch Roman Catholic politician. He was Minister of Justice in the Kuyper cabinet from 1901 to 1905. He was also a member of the Dutch House of Representatives from 1896 to 1901 for Den Bosch and again from 1905 to 1920, until 1917 representing Waalwijk. From 1908 to 1909, Loeff was parliamentary leader of the General League of Roman Catholic Electoral Associations.

== Early life ==
Jan Loeff was born on 15 November 1858 in Baardwijk to Hendrikus Loeff, mayor of Baardwijk from 1842 to 1880 and municipal secretary, and Petronella Johanna Antonia van Heesbeen. Loeff initially intended on entering the Catholic priesthood, attending the minor seminary in Sint Michielsgestel and the major seminary in Haaren. Loeff dropped out of seminary in 1880, and began studying law at Leiden University, where he obtained his doctorate cum laude in 1887. Loeff subsequently established his own law practice in Den Bosch in 1887, which he ran together with his brother from 1891. He was also appointed as deputy judge in Den Bosch in 1890.

== Political career ==
Loeff entered politics by being elected to the Provincial Council of North Brabant in 1889, in which he served until 1901. He was also a member of the municipal council of Den Bosch from 1893 to 1901. Loeff was first elected to the House of Representatives in 1896 for the Den Bosch electoral district. As an MP, Loeff focused largely on justice and internal affairs. Ideologically, Loeff was known as a moderate, pragmatic conservative. He was initially affiliated with the conservative Catholic Bahlmannian faction in the House of Representatives, and later joined the General League of Roman Catholic Electoral Associations upon its founding.

In 1898, Loeff was a member of a commission tasked with researching three laws proposed by Pieter Cort van der Linden on children's protection, which were eventually successfully passed in 1901. He was one of three Catholic MPs who voted against a change to military legislation in 1899, which granted far-reaching authority to national leadership in case of martial law.

=== Minister of Justice ===
In 1901, Loeff was appointed as Minister of Justice by Prime Minister Abraham Kuyper. He was immediately tasked with implementing the children's legislation passed under his predecessor, but was only able to undertake measures to that effect in 1905. He also helped implement legislation establishing several appeals courts headed by a Central Appeals Tribunal in 1902, and a new military legal code in 1903, though said code would only come into effect in 1923.

During the 1903 railway strikes, Loeff submitted a proposal to ban strikes among government employees, which he saw as an unacceptable threat to civic life and an intrusion upon the rights of those willing to work, in contrast to labor activity among private employees, which Loeff did not seek to impede. Loeff also began work on legislation to combat perceived vice, which was later successfully passed under minister Robert Regout. He was able to pass a law in 1905 legalizing lotteries for the purposes of charity or stimulating scientific research, but which were banned from issuing cash prizes.

=== Return to the House of Representatives ===
Loeff returned to the House of Representatives in 1905, this time representing the Waalwijk electoral district. In 1908, Loeff became parliamentary leader of the Roman Catholic parliamentary group in the House of Representatives, but he was soon succeeded in 1910 by Wiel Nolens. He was considered for both the positions of Speaker of the House in 1908, and to become a minister in the Heemskerk cabinet, the last of which he refused for health reasons.

Loeff became internationally known as a delegate to the Second Hague Conference in 1907, and as chair of a 1909 commission to resolve a border dispute between Norway and Sweden. In the latter part of his parliamentary career, Loeff participated in many House commissions, including a 1910 constitutional commission, commissions on private international law and pensions and a commission on the writing of the Dutch language. In 1913, Loeff held a speech advocating for equalizing government funding between religious and public schools during that year's budgetary debates, which motivated prime minister Cort van der Linden to institute a parliamentary commission to resolve the school struggle. In 1909, Loeff voted against legislation to implement a ten-hour working day, and supported a failed motion to extend a proposed 45-hour working week to 48 hours.

In 1920, Loeff left the House of Representatives to take up a position in the Council of State.

== Later life ==
Loeff remained active in Catholic civic life after the end of his political career as he had been for a long time, including as editor for the Catholic magazine De Beiaard. A long-time sufferer from rheumatism, Loeff died on 10 July 1921 in The Hague.

== Personal life ==
Loeff married Maria Catharina Josepha Sweens on 22 September 1891, with whom he had seven sons and three daughters. One son, Hendrik Loeff, served as mayor of Den Bosch from 1945 to 1960, another son was appointed to the Supreme Court of the Netherlands in 1960, and his daughter Lucie was a municipal councilor in Den Bosch from 1930 to 1935.
