= Christian Historical Voters' League =

Political party in the Netherlands

The Christian Historical Voters' League (Dutch: Christelijk Historische Kiezersbond, CHK) was a conservative protestant political party in the Netherlands.

== Party history ==
The CHK was founded in 1897. It was a continuation of the National Party, which was founded in 1888 but had never won a seat in parliament. They were founded as one of several parties that were founded in the 1890s, which all turned again the leadership and ideology of Abraham Kuyper, the leader of the Protestant Anti-Revolutionary Party. Kuyper had initiated a new political course for Protestantism in the Netherlands, which included cooperation with the Catholics in the Coalition, strategical support for extension of suffrage, a rejection of theocracy in favour of a specific conception of state neutrality, sphere sovereignty and a strong party organisation and party discipline.

The party was led by two Reformed ministers Bronsveld and De Visser. In the 1897 general election, De Visser was elected to the House of Representatives for the district of Rotterdam I, while Bronsveld became party chair. A conflict between the two developed, as De Visser sought for the party to cooperate with other Christian historical parties, such as the Frisian League and Free Anti Revolutionary Party (VAR), while Bronsveld did not.

In the 1901 general election, De Visser was elected for the district of Amsterdam II. In the same year, De Visser succeeded Bronsveld as chair and opened talks with the VAR. In April 1903, the VAR and the CHK merged to form the Christian Historical Party (CHP); in 1908, the CHP would in turn merge with the Frisian League to form the Christian Historical Union.

== Name ==
The term "Christian historical" was used before 1897 to denote supporters of the main Protestant party, the Anti-Revolutionary Party, emphasising the Protestant nature of the history of the Netherlands. Furthermore, the CHK styled itself a voters' league instead of a conventional political party.

== Ideology & issues ==
The CHK was formed as a result of dissent within the main Protestant party, the Anti-Revolutionary Party. Unlike that party, the CHK did not recognise Catholicism as a legitimate religion. The party was strongly anti-papist.

Furthermore, the party opposed universal suffrage. The party was divided over the issue of religious education, with Bronsveld advocating Protestant-inspired public education and De Visser advocating separate Protestant schools.

== Representation ==
This table show the CHK's results in elections to the House of Representatives and Senate, as well as the party's parliamentary leader.

Year	HoR	S	Parliamentary leader	Cabinet
1897	1	0	Johannes de Visser	opposition
1898	1	0	Johannes de Visser	opposition
1899	1	0	Johannes de Visser	opposition
1900	1	0	Johannes de Visser	opposition
1901	1	0	Johannes de Visser	supports Kuyper cabinet
1902	1	0	Johannes de Visser	supports Kuyper cabinet

== Electorate ==
The electorate of the CHK was mainly constituted by adherents of the Dutch Reformed Church from the upper class.
