= Franciscus Theodorus Johannes Hubertus Dobbelmann =

Dutch soap manufacturer and politician (1830–1912)

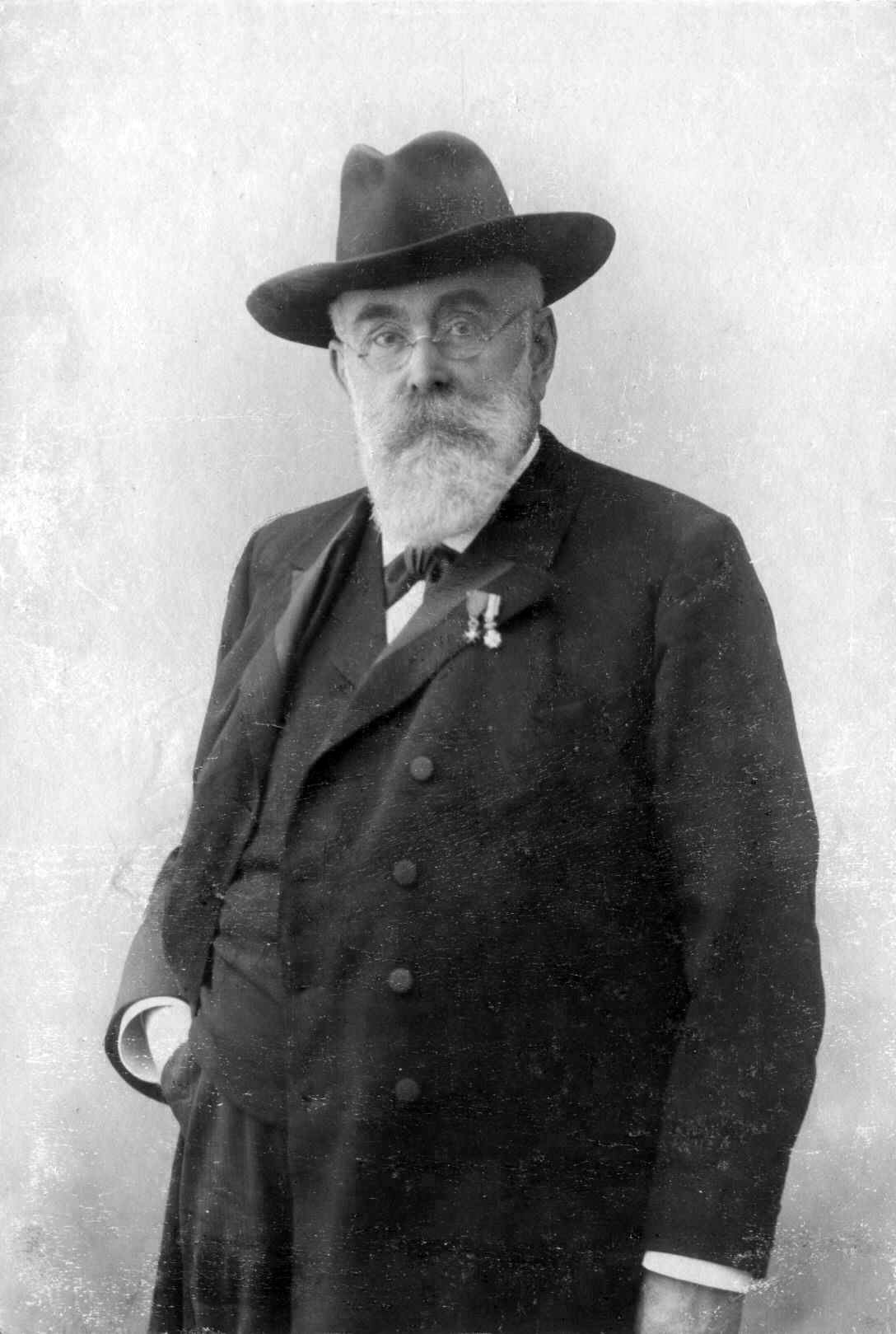
- Dobbelmann ca. 1900

Member of the House of Representatives
- In office 9 July 1889 – 17 September 1901
- Preceded by: Anthonie Ernst Reuther
- Succeeded by: Octaaf van Nispen tot Sevenaer
- Constituency: Nijmegen

Personal details
- Born: 8 August 1830 Nijmegen, Netherlands
- Died: 18 December 1912 (aged 82) Nijmegen, Netherlands
- Party: Roman Catholic
- Spouse(s): Kornelia Reijners; Elisabeth Paulina Apollonia Ketelaar
- Children: 5, including Pierre

Franciscus Theodorus Johannes Hubertus Dobbelmann (8 August 1830 – 18 December 1912) was a Dutch soap manufacturer and politician. From 1889 to 1901, Dobbelmann was a member of the Dutch House of Representatives for the Nijmegen electoral district. He was chairman of the Catholic parliamentary group in the House of Representatives from 1896 to 1901.

== Early life and soap manufacturing ==
Dobbelmann was born on 8 August 1830 in Nijmegen to Johann Peter Dobbelmann, a colonial wares merchant of German descent who bought a soap factory in 1854, and Maria Elisabeth Allegonda Soiron. The Dobbelmann family had already a part of the Catholic elite of Nijmegen during this period. Franciscus Dobbelmann attended secondary school in Nijmegen, and then undertook a practical education in trade from 1847 to 1854.

In 1863, Dobbelmann became the director of the soap factory his father had bought. Under his tenure, the Dobbelmann firm pioneered the use of palm oil in soapmaking, and produced soap in a variety of different colors apart from the usual orange which made the product popular among customers, including internationally. In addition, Dobbelmann was chairman of the Nijmegen chamber of commerce from 1897, and head of the Catholic poor relief in Nijmegen from 1861.

== Political career ==
Dobbelmann began his political career on the local level, being elected for the first time to the Nijmegen municipal council in 1875, in which he would serve until 1905. He was also a member of the Provincial Council of Gelderland, from 1877 to 1895.

Dobbelmann was first elected to the House of Representatives for the Nijmegen electoral district in an 1889 by-election. As an MP, Dobbelmann focused primarily on matters related to trade, such as tariffs and import duties, and military affairs. Dobbelmann was a strong advocate of protectionism to support Dutch industry and agriculture, and in 1894 he managed to pass a motion to increase tariffs through the House of Representatives over the objections of the liberal Roëll cabinet. He also paid attention to the care for the poor, dedicating his first parliamentary speech to the subject.

Following the 1891 Dutch general election, Dobbelmann was one of several Catholic MPs, including Louis Michiels van Verduynen and Felix Walter, who helped establish a formal Catholic parliamentary group. In 1896, Dobbelmann was chosen as chairman of the Catholic parliamentary group. As chairman, he presided over the adoption of a party program, heavily influenced by the ideas of Herman Schaepman, which is often seen as the beginning of formal Catholic party politics. Among socialists, Dobbelmann was derisively nicknamed the "soaper MP" for his origins in the soap manufacturing business. Dobbelmann chose not to run for re-election in the 1901 Dutch general election.

== Later life ==
In 1903, Dobbelmann retired from his soapmaking business, handing over formal control over the company to his only son Pierre Dobbelmann the year after.

Franciscus Dobbelmann died on 18 December 1912 in Nijmegen.

== Personal life ==
Dobbelmann was married twice, the first time to Kornelia Reijners, with whom he had one daughter. His second marriage was to Elisabeth Paulina Apollonia Ketelaar, with whom he had three daughters and one son, businessman and later Roman Catholic State Party senator from 1922 to 1932 Pierre Dobbelmann.
