= Arthur Kool =

Dutch soldier and politician

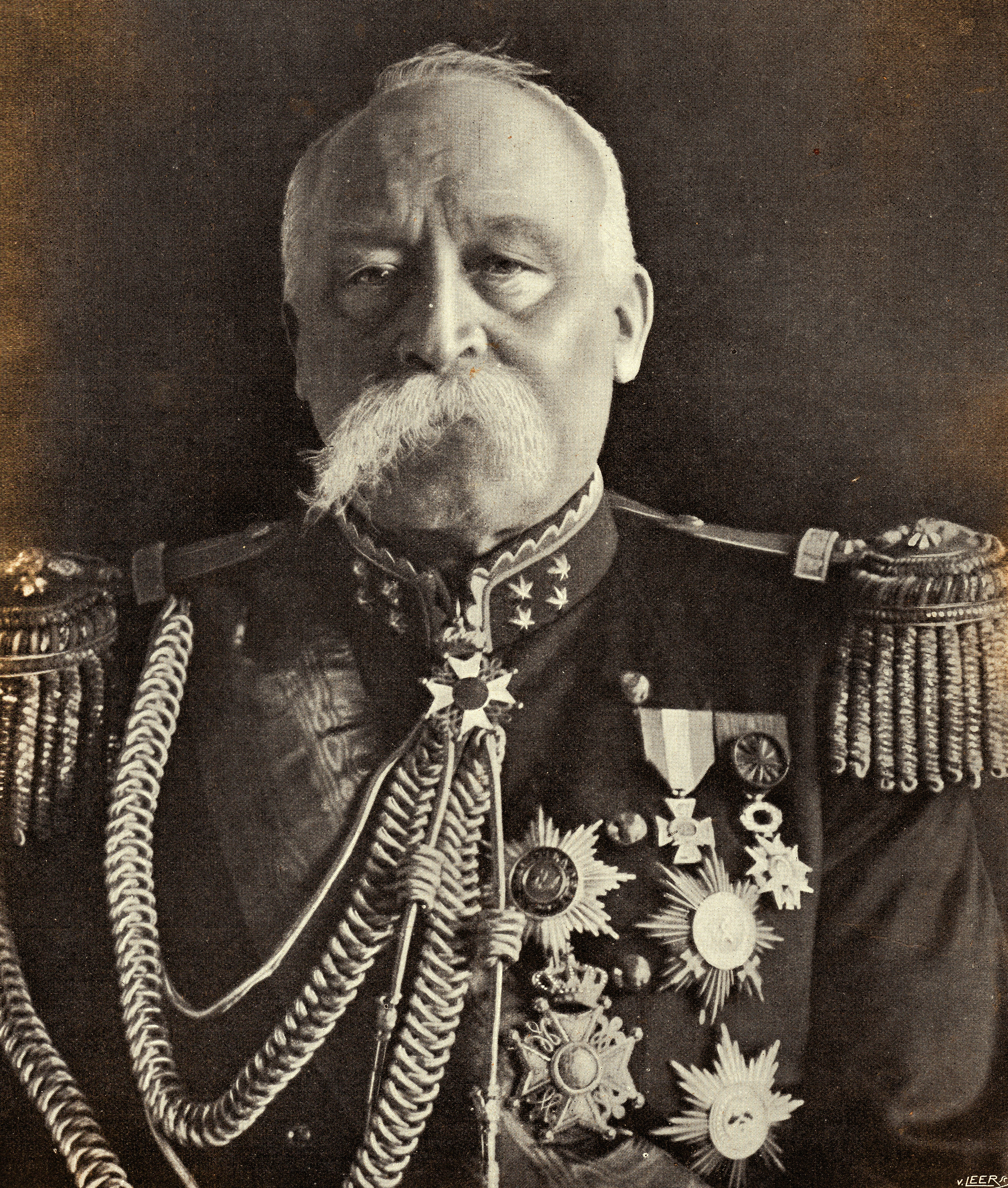
- Portrait of General Kool in 1909
- Born: 21 February 1841; Maastricht, Netherlands
- Died: 24 March 1914 (aged 73); The Hague, Netherlands
- Citizenship: Dutch
- Occupations: Soldier; Politician
- Known for: Minister of War of the Netherlands

Minister of War of the Netherlands
- In office 1 April 1901 – 1 August 1901
- Prime Minister: Nicolaas Pierson
- Preceded by: Kornelis Eland
- Succeeded by: Johannes Bergansius

Arthur Kool (21 February 1841 – 24 March 1914) was a Dutch soldier and politician who served as the Minister of War of the Netherlands in 1901.

== Early life and education ==
Kool was born in Maastricht on 21 February 1841, as the eldest of four children of Cornelia Johanna van der Hoeven (1819–1856) and Johan Arthur Kool (1816–1873), the chief engineer of the Aachen-Maastricht Railway Company, and as such, it was him who designed the Maastricht railway bridge. His mother died in 1856, at the age of 37, when Arthur was only 15.

On 16 April 1863, the 22-year-old Kool married Johanna Francoise Adolphine Diemer in Nijmegen, and the couple had three children, Johannetta, Johan Arthur, and Frederika. A few years after Diemer died in 1895, Kool married again, this time to Arnoldine Adriana Diederika Pels Rijcken in Arnhem on 29 December 1898, aged 57. The male descendants from the first marriage called themselves Diemer Kool, and one of his grandsons was Arthur Diemer Kool, a four-time Dutch tennis singles champions.

== Military and political career ==
Following in the footsteps of his father and grandfather, Lieutenant Colonel Aart Kool (1787–1862), the young Arthur Kool opted for a military career, as did his younger brother, enrolling as an artillery cadet at the Royal Military Academy in 1855, aged 14. He went on to serve in both the fortress artillery and the horse artillery, eventually rising to the rank of 1st lieutenant in the military reconnaissance division of the General Staff. His career continued to advance with further promotions, including a transfer to the horse artillery as a captain and a teaching role at the staff school.

From 28 April 1879 to 8 September 1883, Kool was an officer who was a liberal member of the House of Representatives, where he mainly spoke about military matters, giving long speeches about the defense of his country and the Dutch East Indies, and also about the criminal code, railways, and colonies.

After his brief political career, he returned to active military service, receiving a promotion to lieutenant general in December 1897 and taking on the role of Chief of the General Staff, a position he held for 13 years, from 1894 until 1907. His tenure was briefly interrupted in 1901 when he served as Minister of War in the last year of the Pierson cabinet. At that time, this post was one of the least desirable ministerial positions, and likewise, like many before him, Kool did not even last a year. Despite his short mandate, he succeeded in pushing a new proposal about the army reform plans through the parliament, even though the system he advocated was even more costly than the one that the Lower House had previously rejected. This bill "introduced the barracks system for a contingent of conscripts determined by law". From 1 October 1907 to 1 November 1909, he was in charge of the field army, and as such, he oversaw the construction of the artillery barracks in the Gelderland town of Ede, which were thus renamed after him in 1934: Arthur Koolkazerne.

On 31 August 1898, he was appointed as an assistant in extraordinary service to Queen Wilhelmina, giving her lectures and lessons on military affairs and national defense, which concluded the education of the queen who went on to ascend the throne that same year, with Kool remaining her assistant until he died in 1914. On 16 September 1902, General Kool wrote a letter to his children in which he described one of his visits to Queen Wilhelmina in detail, stating that "she looked fine, I think she had become a bit fuller and a bit taller".

== Death ==
Kool died in The Hague on 24 March 1914, at the age of 73.

== Decorations ==
- Commander in the Order of the Netherlands Lion
- Grand Cross of the Order of Orange-Nassau
- Grand Cross in the Order of the House of Orange
- Officer of the French Legion of Honour
- Knight First Class of the Order of the Red Eagle of Prussia
