= Röell cabinet =

Cabinet of the Netherlands, 1894 to 1897

- Cabinet of the Netherlands

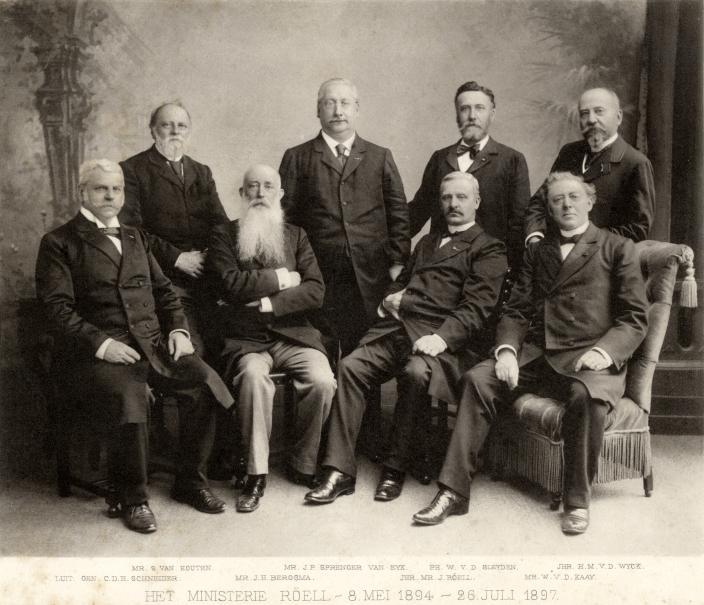
- Meeting of the Röell cabinet
- Date formed: 9 May 1894
- Date dissolved: 27 July 1897 (Demissionary from 28 June 1897)

People and organisations
- Head of state: Queen Wilhelmina
- Head of government: Joan Röell
- Deputy head of government: Samuel van Houten (Unofficially)
- No. of ministers: 8
- Member party: Independent Liberals (I) Liberal Union (LU); Independent Catholics (I) (Confidence and supply)
- Status in legislature: Right-wing Minority government

History
- Election: 1894 election
- Outgoing election: 1897 election
- Legislature terms: 1894–1897
- Predecessor: Van Tienhoven cabinet
- Successor: Pierson cabinet

The Röell cabinet was the cabinet of the Netherlands from 9 May 1894 until 27 July 1897. The cabinet was formed by Independent Liberals (I) after the election of 1894. The right-wing cabinet was a minority government in the House of Representatives but was supported by the Liberal Union (LU) and Independent Catholics (I) for a majority. Independent Conservative Liberal Joan Röell was chairman of the Council of Ministers.

== Cabinet Members ==
Ministers		Title/Ministry		Term of office	Party
Joan Röell	Jonkheer; Joan Röell (1844–1914)	Prime Minister		9 May 1894 – 27 July 1897	Independent; Liberal (Conservative Liberal)
Joan Röell	Jonkheer; Joan Röell (1844–1914)	Minister	Foreign Affairs	9 May 1894 – 27 July 1897	Independent; Liberal (Conservative Liberal)
Samuel van Houten	Samuel van Houten (1837–1930)	Minister	Interior	9 May 1894 – 27 July 1897	Independent; Liberal (Classical Liberal)
Jacobus Sprenger van Eyk	Jacobus Sprenger van Eyk (1842–1907)	Minister	Finance	9 May 1894 – 26 July 1897	Independent; Liberal (Conservative Liberal)
Willem van der Kaay	Willem van der Kaay (1831–1918)	Minister	Justice	9 May 1894 – 27 July 1897	Independent; Liberal (Classical Liberal)
Philippe van der Sleijden	Philippe van der Sleijden (1842–1923)	Minister	Water Management, Commerce and Industry	9 May 1894 – 27 July 1897	Independent; Liberal (Classical Liberal)
Clemens Schneider	Lieutenant general Clemens Schneider (1832–1925)	Minister	War	9 May 1894 – 27 July 1897	Independent; Christian Democrat (Catholic)
Herman van der Wijck	Jonkheer; Herman van der Wijck (1843–1932)	Minister	Navy	9 May 1894 – 27 July 1897	Independent; Liberal (Classical Liberal)
Jacob Bergsma	Jacob Bergsma (1838–1915)	Minister	Colonial Affairs	9 May 1894 – 27 July 1897	Independent; Liberal (Conservative Liberal)
