= Free Anti Revolutionary Party =

Defunct political party in the Netherlands

The Free Anti Revolutionary Party (Dutch: Vrij-Antirevolutionaire Partij, VAR) was a Dutch conservative Reformed political party, which existed from 1898 to 1903.

== Party history ==
The VAR was founded as one of several parties that were founded in the 1890s, which all turned against the leadership and ideology of Abraham Kuyper, the leader of the Protestant Anti Revolutionary Party. Kuyper had initiated a new political course for Protestantism in the Netherlands, which included cooperation with the Catholics, in the coalition, strategical support for extension of suffrage a rejection of theocracy in favour of a specific conception of state neutrality, sphere sovereignty and a strong party organization and party discipline. The opposition against Kuyper was led by Alexander de Savorin Lohman.

The elections of 1894 proved decisive. An important issue in the election was the extension of suffrage proposed by the Minister of the Interior Johannes Tak van Poortvliet. After the election two anti-revolutionary parliamentary parties were formed one, led by Kuyper favoured the suffrage which was backed by the ARP, while the other led by De Savorin Lohman rejected it. With De Savorin Lohman many aristocrats and noblemen left the ARP, as did adherents of the Dutch Reformed Church, as opposed to the Reformed Churches in the Netherlands, which was founded by Kuyper himself. The group around De Savorin Lohman sought to found a new party. In 1896, they set up a commission to found a new party. In September 1898 the Free Anti Revolutionary Party was founded.

In the 1901 elections, the party won nine seats, four more than the five the free Anti Revolutionaries had won as individual candidates in 1897. The religious parties won a majority in this election, a cabinet was formed by ARP leader Kuyper, which the VAR supported without providing any ministers.

In 1903, the VAR merged with the Christian Historical Voters' League to form the Christian Historical Party.

== Name ==
The term anti-revolutionary was used to denote supporters of the main Protestant party, the Anti Revolutionary Party, which denounced the French Revolution. The dissenters against the organizational and political course of the ARP called themselves free antirevolutionaries, implying that they upheld the Anti Revolutionary beliefs without being a member of the strong party organisation.

== Ideology and issues ==
The VAR was a conservative Protestant party. It saw government as a God-given institution, which should act according to Biblical norms. Society should furthermore follow its historical course. Power should not be based on the opinion of the majority but on authority.

The VAR was formed as a result of dissent within the main Protestant party the Anti Revolutionary Party. Unlike that party the VAR did not recognize Catholicism as a legitimate religion. The party was strongly anti-papist. According to the VAR the Netherlands was a Protestant nation. As such it was hostile to the Roman Catholic segment of society. It renounced the coalition between the Protestant Anti Revolutionary Party and the Catholic General League and more generally it rejected the antithesis between religious and non-religious parties. Catholic influences within society should be limited.

The VAR advocated limited government. It supported only limited government interference in the economy and instead advocated charity to help the poor. Furthermore, the party opposed general suffrage.

== Representation ==
This table shows the VAR's results in elections to the House of Representatives and Senate, as well as the party's political leadership: the fractievoorzitter. It also possible that the party leader is member of cabinet, if the VAR was part of the governing coalition, the "highest ranking" minister is listed.

Year	HoR	S	Lijsttrekker	Cabinet
1897	5	3	Alexander de Savornin Lohman	opposition
1898	5	3	Alexander de Savornin Lohman	opposition
1899	5	3	Alexander de Savornin Lohman	opposition
1900	5	2	Alexander de Savornin Lohman	opposition
1901	9	2	Alexander de Savornin Lohman	supports the cabinet of Kuyper
1902	9	3	Alexander de Savornin Lohman	supports the cabinet of Kuyper

== Electorate ==
The electorate of the VAR was mainly constituted by adherents of the Dutch Reformed Church from the upper class, especially nobility, land owners, high officers and high-ranking civil servants. It won and kept seats in several districts with large reformed populations, Goes in Zeeland, Apeldoorn in Gelderland, Dokkum in Friesland and Katwijk and Schiedam in South Holland.
