= Kuyper cabinet =

Cabinet of the Netherlands, 1901 to 1905

- Cabinet of the Netherlands
- Date formed: 1 August 1901
- Date dissolved: 17 August 1905 (Demissionary from 3 July 1905)

People and organisations
- Head of state: Queen Wilhelmina
- Head of government: Abraham Kuyper
- No. of ministers: 8
- Ministers removed: 4
- Total no. of members: 11
- Member party: 1 August 1901 – 15 October 1904 Independent Catholics; Anti-Revolutionary Party 15 October 1904 – 17 August 1905 General League; Anti-Revolutionary Party
- Status in legislature: Right-wing Minority government

History
- Incoming formation: 1901
- Outgoing formation: 1905
- Election: 1901 election
- Outgoing election: 1905 election
- Legislature terms: 1901–1905
- Predecessor: Pierson cabinet
- Successor: De Meester cabinet

The Kuyper cabinet was the cabinet of the Netherlands from 1 August 1901 until 17 August 1905. The cabinet was formed by the political party Anti-Revolutionary Party (ARP) and Independent Catholics (I) after the election of 1901. The right-wing cabinet was a minority government in the House of Representatives. Abraham Kuyper, the Leader of the Anti-Revolutionary Party was Prime Minister.

== Composition ==
| Title | Minister | | | Term of office | |
| Title | Image | Name | Party | Start | End |
|---|---|---|---|---|---|
| Chairman of the Council of Ministers; Minister of the Interior | Abraham Kuyper | Abraham Kuyper | ARP | 1 August 1901 | 17 August 1905 |
| Minister of Foreign Affairs | | Robert Melvil van Lynden | ARP | 1 August 1901 | 9 March 1905 |
| Minister of Foreign Affairs | Abraham George Ellis | Abraham George Ellis (ad interim) | Indep. | 9 March 1905 | 22 April 1905 |
| Minister of Foreign Affairs | | Willem van Weede van Berencamp | Indep. | 22 April 1905 | 7 August 1905 |
| Minister of Foreign Affairs | Abraham George Ellis | Abraham George Ellis (ad interim) | Indep. | 7 August 1905 | 17 August 1905 |
| Minister of Finance | Jan Harte van Tecklenburg | Jan Harte van Tecklenburg | Indep. | 1 August 1901 | 17 August 1905 |
| Minister of Finance | Jan Harte van Tecklenburg | Jan Harte van Tecklenburg | General League | 1 August 1901 | 17 August 1905 |
| Minister of Justice | Jan Loeff | Jan Loeff | Indep. | 1 August 1901 | 17 August 1905 |
| Minister of Justice | Jan Loeff | Jan Loeff | General League | 1 August 1901 | 17 August 1905 |
| Minister of Water Management, Commerce and Industry | Johannes Christiaan de Marez Oyens | Johannes Christiaan de Marez Oyens | ARP | 1 August 1901 | 17 August 1905 |
| Minister of War | Johannes Bergansius | Johannes Bergansius | Indep. | 1 August 1901 | 17 August 1905 |
| Minister of War | Johannes Bergansius | Johannes Bergansius | General League | 1 August 1901 | 17 August 1905 |
| Minister of the Navy | Gerhardus Kruys | Gerhardus Kruys | Indep. | 1 August 1901 | 12 December 1902 |
| Minister of the Navy | Johannes Bergansius | Johannes Bergansius (ad interim) | Indep. | 12 December 1902 | 16 March 1903 |
| Minister of the Navy | Abraham George Ellis | Abraham George Ellis | Indep. | 16 March 1903 | 17 August 1905 |
| Minister of Colonial Affairs | Titus van Asch van Wijck | Titus van Asch van Wijck | ARP | 1 August 1901 | 9 September 1902 |
| Minister of Colonial Affairs | Johannes Bergansius | Johannes Bergansius (ad interim) | Indep. | 9 September 1902 | 25 September 1902 |
| Minister of Colonial Affairs | Alexander Idenburg | Alexander Idenburg | ARP | 25 September 1902 | 17 August 1905 |
