= Baardwijk =

Former Dutch village and municipality

Coordinates: 51°42′N 5°06′E

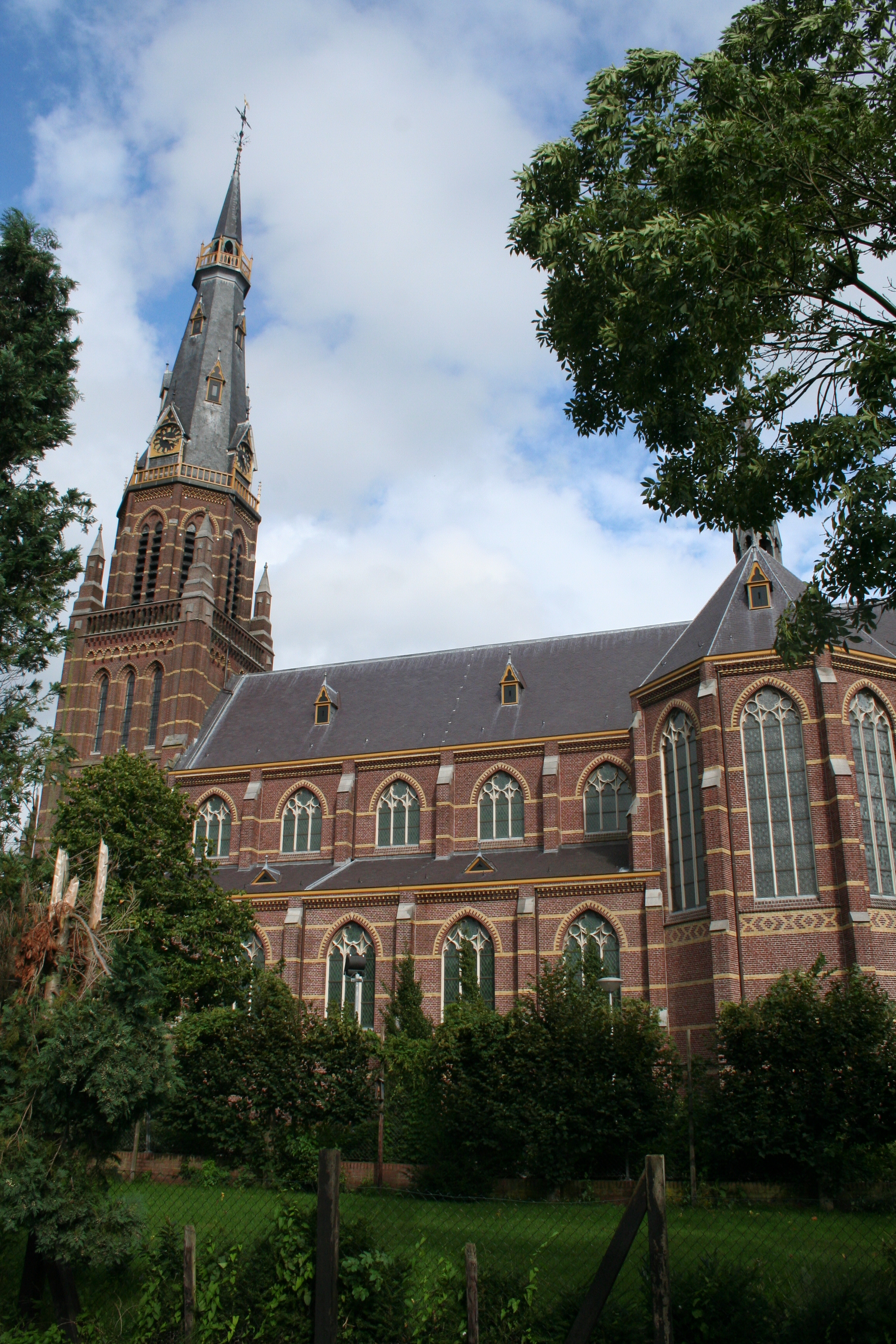
Clemens church in Baardwijk

Baardwijk is a former village and municipality in the Dutch province of North Brabant, between Waalwijk and Drunen.

Until 1922, Baardwijk was a separate municipality; it is now a part of Waalwijk.
