= Pierson cabinet =

Cabinet of the Netherlands, 1897 to 1901

- Cabinet of the Netherlands

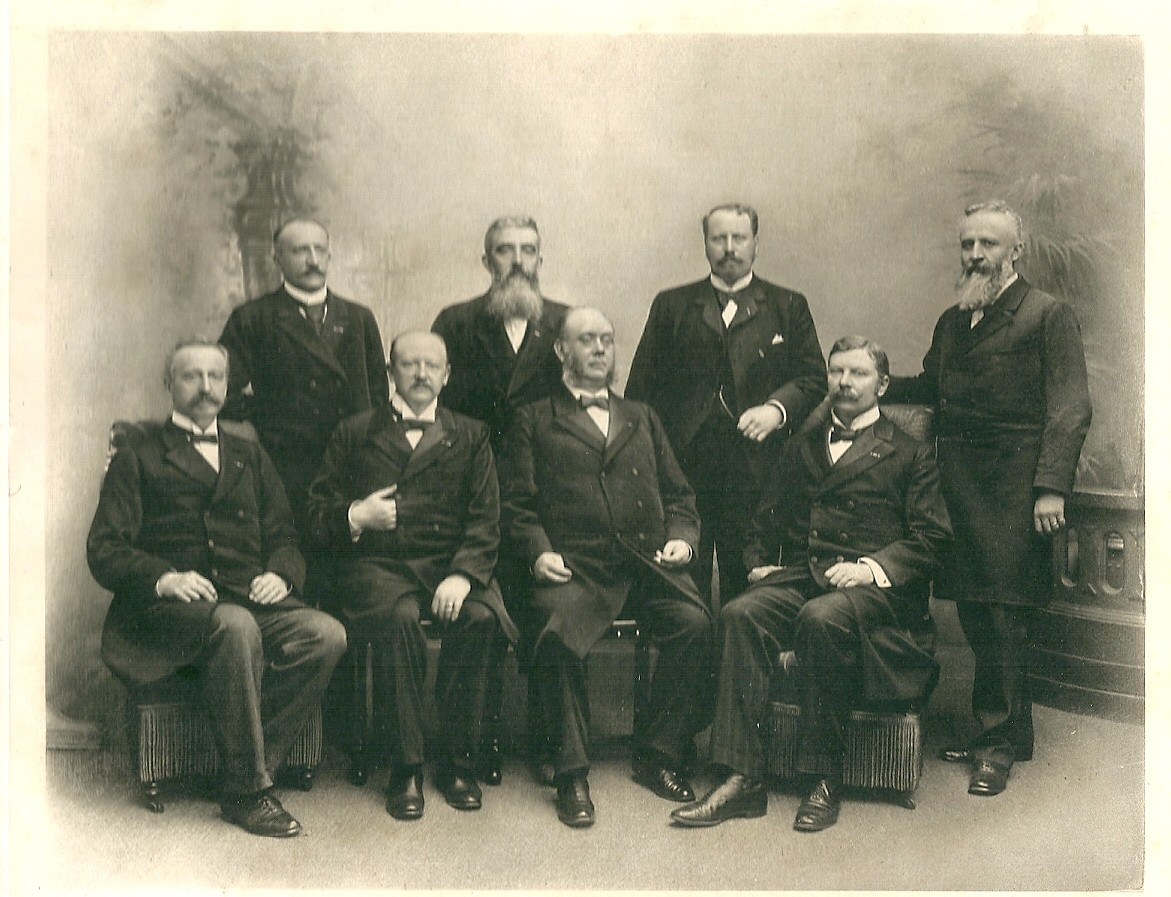
- Meeting of the Pierson cabinet
- Date formed: 27 July 1897
- Date dissolved: 1 August 1901 (Demissionary from 28 June 1901)

People and organisations
- Head of state: Queen Wilhelmina
- Head of government: Nicolaas Pierson
- Head of government's history: Hendrik Goeman Borgesius (Unofficially)
- No. of ministers: 8
- Ministers removed: 2
- Total no. of members: 10
- Member party: Liberal Union (LU) Independent Liberals (I) (Confidence and supply)
- Status in legislature: Left-liberal Minority government

History
- Election: 1897 election
- Outgoing election: 1901 election
- Legislature terms: 1897–1901
- Predecessor: Röell cabinet
- Successor: Kuyper cabinet

The Pierson cabinet was the cabinet of the Netherlands from 27 July 1897 until 1 August 1901. The cabinet was formed by the political party Liberal Union (CU) after the election of 1897. The left-liberal cabinet was a minority government in the House of Representatives but was supported by Independent Liberals for a majority. Nicolaas Pierson of the Liberal Union was Prime Minister.

== Cabinet Members ==
Ministers		Title/Ministry		Term of office	Party
Nicolaas Pierson	Nicolaas Pierson (1839–1909)	Prime Minister		27 July 1897 – 1 August 1901	Liberal Union
Nicolaas Pierson	Nicolaas Pierson (1839–1909)	Minister	Finance	27 July 1897 – 1 August 1901	Liberal Union
Hendrik Goeman Borgesius	Dr. Hendrik Goeman; Borgesius (1847–1917)	Minister	Interior	27 July 1897 – 1 August 1901	Liberal Union
Willem Hendrik de Beaufort	Willem de Beaufort (1845–1918)	Minister	Foreign Affairs	27 July 1897 – 1 August 1901	Independent; Liberal (Conservative Liberal)
Pieter Cort van der Linden	Dr. Pieter Cort van der Linden (1846–1935)	Minister	Justice	27 July 1897 – 1 August 1901	Independent; Liberal (Classical Liberal)
Cornelis Lely	Cornelis Lely (1854–1929)	Minister	Water Management, Commerce and Industry	27 July 1897 – 1 August 1901	Liberal Union
Joannes Coenraad Jansen	Joannes Coenraad; Jansen (1840–1925)	Minister	War	27 July 1897 – 31 July 1897^{[Ad interim]}	Liberal Union
Kornelis Eland	Lieutenant general Kornelis Eland (1838–1927)	Minister	War	31 July 1897 – 1 April 1901^{[Res]}	Liberal Union
Arthur Kool	Lieutenant general Arthur Kool (1841–1914)	Minister	War	1 April 1901 – 1 August 1901	Liberal Union
Joannes Coenraad Jansen	Joannes Coenraad; Jansen (1840–1925)	Minister	Navy	27 July 1897 – 22 December 1897^{[Res]}	Liberal Union
Kornelis Eland	Lieutenant general Kornelis Eland (1838–1927)	Minister	Navy	22 December 1897 – 12 January 1898^{[Ad interim]}	Liberal Union
Jacob Röell	Vice admiral Jonkheer; Jacob Röell (1838–1924)	Minister	Navy	12 January 1898 – 1 August 1901	Independent; Liberal (Classical Liberal)
Jacob Theodoor Cremer	Jacob Theodoor; Cremer (1847–1923)	Minister	Colonial Affairs	27 July 1897 – 1 August 1901	Liberal Union

^{Res} Resigned.
^{Ad interim} Served ad interim.
