= Johannes Christiaan de Marez Oyens =

Dutch politician

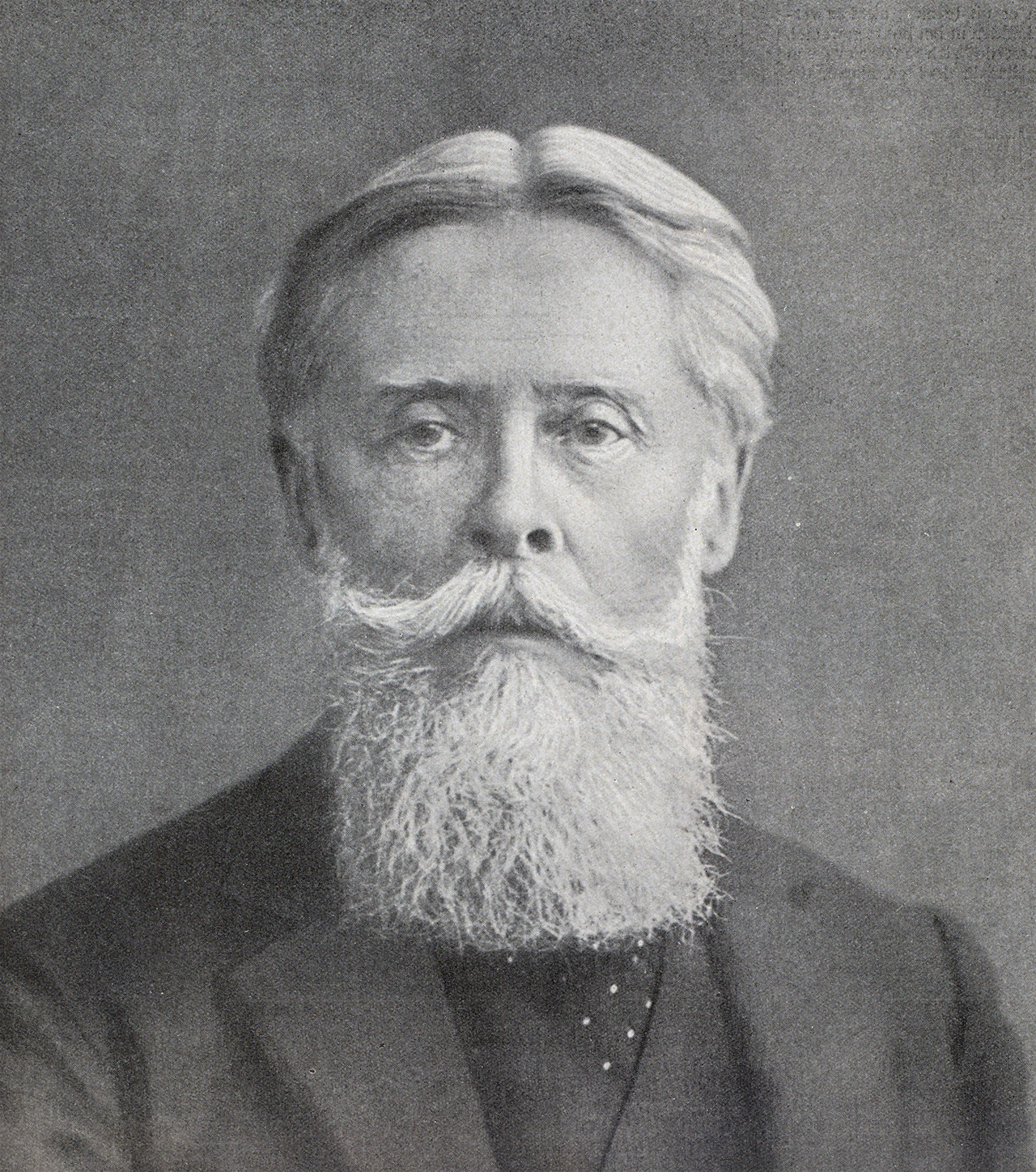
Johannes Christiaan de Marez Oyens

Johannes Christiaan de Marez Oyens (21 January 1845, Amsterdam – 11 August 1911, Partenkirchen) was a Dutch politician.
