= Liberal Protectionist =

Liberal Protectionist was the name under which three candidates sought election to the House of Commons of Canada for ridings in Quebec in two elections in the early twentieth century.

The Liberal Party of Canada, at the time, was associated with the concept of free trade. Protectionists opposed the concept.

In the 1925 federal election, Léopold Doyon won 2,839 votes, 19.4% of the total, as the only opponent of the Liberal candidate in St. Henri. (Twenty years later he would be a Social Credit candidate in Hochelaga). Former Liberal MP Ruben Charles Laurier running as a Liberal Protectionist won 4,076 votes in St. James riding, 26.9% of the total, as the only opponent of the Liberal candidate.

In the 1930 federal election, Lyon William Jacobs won 2,723 votes, 10.2% of the total, placing third of four candidates in Laurier—Outremont riding.

== See also ==
- List of political parties in Canada

Source: Parliament of Canada History of the Federal Electoral Ridings since 1867
