= 1901 Dutch general election =

| ← 1897 | 14 June 1901 (first round); 27 June 1901 (second round) | 1905 → |
- All 100 seats in the House of Representatives; 51 seats needed for a majority
- Turnout: 73.05% (first round); 77.66% (second round)
| Party | Leader | Seats | +/– |
|---|---|---|---|
| Catholic | Franciscus Dobbelmann | 25 | +3 |
| ARP | Abraham Kuyper | 24 | +6 |
| LU | Hendrik Goeman Borgesius | 21 | −17 |
| VL | Joan Röell | 8 | 0 |
| SDAP | Pieter Jelles Troelstra | 7 | +3 |
| VAR | Alexander de Savornin Lohman | 7 | +3 |
| VDB | Hendrik Lodewijk Drucker | 6 | +2 |
| CHK | Johannes de Visser | 1 | −1 |
| FB | Jan Schokking | 1 | New |
This lists parties that won seats. See the complete results below.
| Cabinet before | Cabinet after |
|---|---|
| Pierson cabinet Liberal | Kuyper cabinet Coalition |

General elections were held in the Netherlands on 14 June 1901, with a second round in some constituencies on 27 June. The Catholic group became the largest in the House of Representatives, winning 25 of the 100 seats.

== Electoral system ==
The 100 seats in the House of Representatives were elected in single-member constituencies using the two-round system.

== Results ==
| Party | First round | | | Second round | | | Total seats |
| Party | Votes | % | Seats | Votes | % | Seats | Total seats |
|---|---|---|---|---|---|---|---|
| Anti-Revolutionary Party | 101,726 | 26.15 | 19 | 47,813 | 24.17 | 5 | 24 |
| Liberal Union | 91,497 | 23.52 | 7 | 47,212 | 23.86 | 14 | 21 |
| Catholics | 65,739 | 16.90 | 23 | 25,888 | 13.09 | 2 | 25 |
| Social Democratic Workers' Party | 39,066 | 10.04 | 0 | 25,294 | 12.79 | 7 | 7 |
| Free-thinking Democratic League | 28,094 | 7.22 | 1 | 15,567 | 7.87 | 5 | 6 |
| Free Liberals | 26,565 | 6.83 | 3 | 19,327 | 9.77 | 5 | 8 |
| Free Anti Revolutionary Party | 17,428 | 4.48 | 4 | 8,943 | 4.52 | 3 | 7 |
| Christian Historical Voters' League | 6,189 | 1.59 | 0 | 2,323 | 1.17 | 1 | 1 |
| Frisian League | 4,238 | 1.09 | 1 | 1,449 | 0.73 | 0 | 1 |
| Catholic Democrat | 1,119 | 0.29 | 0 | | | | 0 |
| Independent | 7,356 | 1.89 | 0 | 4,019 | 2.03 | 0 | 0 |
| Total | 389,017 | 100.00 | 58 | 197,835 | 100.00 | 42 | 100 |
| Valid votes | 389,017 | 98.06 | | 197,835 | 99.05 | | |
| Invalid/blank votes | 7,715 | 1.94 | | 1,899 | 0.95 | | |
| Total votes | 396,732 | 100.00 | | 199,734 | 100.00 | | |
| Registered voters/turnout | 543,094 | 73.05 | | 257,191 | 77.66 | | |
Source: Kiesraad, Huygens

Several candidates ran in multiple districts. When they won in more than one seat they picked which seat to take. As a result, several by-elections took place shortly after the general election.

=== By district ===
Results by district
| District | Candidate | Party | First round | | Second round | |
| District | Candidate | Party | Votes | % | Votes | % |
|---|---|---|---|---|---|---|
| Alkmaar | E. Fokker | Free-thinking Democratic League | 2,590 | 42.23 | 3,888 | 57.18 |
| Alkmaar | N. Oosterbaan | Anti-Revolutionary Party | 2,175 | 35.46 | 2,911 | 42.82 |
| Alkmaar | W. C. Bosman | Liberal Union | 941 | 15.34 | | |
| Alkmaar | J. G. van Kuykhof | Social Democratic Workers' Party | 427 | 6.96 | | |
| Alkmaar | Valid votes | | 6,133 | 98.35 | 6,799 | 99.17 |
| Alkmaar | Invalid/blank votes | | 103 | 1.65 | 57 | 0.83 |
| Alkmaar | Total votes | | 6,236 | 100 | 6,856 | 100 |
| Alkmaar | Registered voters/turnout | | 7,824 | 79.70 | 7,824 | 87.63 |
| Almelo | H. J. A. M. Schaepman | Catholic | Unopposed | | | |
| Amersfoort | T. A. J. van Asch van Wijck | Anti-Revolutionary Party | 2,632 | 59.91 | | |
| Amersfoort | C. Roëll | Christian Historical Voters' League | 838 | 19.08 | | |
| Amersfoort | J. Oudegeest | Social Democratic Workers' Party | 431 | 9.81 | | |
| Amersfoort | A. J. A. Thomas | Liberal Union | 412 | 9.38 | | |
| Amersfoort | W. Wijck | Liberal Union | 80 | 1.82 | | |
| Amersfoort | Valid votes | | 4,393 | 96.49 | | |
| Amersfoort | Invalid/blank votes | | 160 | 3.51 | | |
| Amersfoort | Total votes | | 4,553 | 100 | | |
| Amersfoort | Registered voters/turnout | | 7,046 | 64.62 | | |
| Amsterdam I | H. F. R. Hubrecht | Liberal Union | 1,262 | 45.86 | 1,696 | 61.43 |
| Amsterdam I | J. F. M. Sterck | Catholic | 959 | 34.85 | 1,065 | 38.57 |
| Amsterdam I | P. L. Tak | Social Democratic Workers' Party | 251 | 9.12 | | |
| Amsterdam I | H. L. van Hasselt | Independent | 186 | 6.76 | | |
| Amsterdam I | A. N. J. Fabius | Free-thinking Democratic League | 94 | 3.42 | | |
| Amsterdam I | Valid votes | | 2,752 | 98.22 | 2,761 | 98.89 |
| Amsterdam I | Invalid/blank votes | | 50 | 1.78 | 31 | 1.11 |
| Amsterdam I | Total votes | | 2,802 | 100 | 2,792 | 100 |
| Amsterdam I | Registered voters/turnout | | 4,771 | 58.73 | 4,771 | 58.52 |
| Amsterdam II | H. F. Groen van Waarder | Free Liberals | 522 | 35.10 | 783 | 45.74 |
| Amsterdam II | J. T. de Visser | Christian Historical Voters' League | 521 | 35.04 | 929 | 54.26 |
| Amsterdam II | J. W. Smit | Catholic | 187 | 12.58 | | |
| Amsterdam II | H. H. Wollring | Social Democratic Workers' Party | 157 | 10.56 | | |
| Amsterdam II | F. Mol | Free-thinking Democratic League | 100 | 6.72 | | |
| Amsterdam II | Valid votes | | 1,487 | 96.75 | 1,712 | 98.56 |
| Amsterdam II | Invalid/blank votes | | 50 | 3.25 | 25 | 1.44 |
| Amsterdam II | Total votes | | 1,537 | 100 | 1,737 | 100 |
| Amsterdam II | Registered voters/turnout | | 2,475 | 62.10 | 2,475 | 70.18 |
| Amsterdam III | C. H. den Hertog | Liberal Union | 1,603 | 37.78 | 2,531 | 54.52 |
| Amsterdam III | H. Polak | Social Democratic Workers' Party | 1,420 | 33.47 | 2,111 | 45.48 |
| Amsterdam III | E. A. Smidt | Free-thinking Democratic League | 482 | 11.36 | | |
| Amsterdam III | A. C. Bleys | Catholic | 376 | 8.86 | | |
| Amsterdam III | J. H. de Waal Malefijt | Anti-Revolutionary Party | 362 | 8.53 | | |
| Amsterdam III | Valid votes | | 4,243 | 97.59 | 4,642 | 99.38 |
| Amsterdam III | Invalid/blank votes | | 105 | 2.41 | 29 | 0.62 |
| Amsterdam III | Total votes | | 4,348 | 100 | 4,671 | 100 |
| Amsterdam III | Registered voters/turnout | | 7,122 | 61.05 | 7,122 | 65.59 |
| Amsterdam IV | H. Goeman Borgesius | Liberal Union | 1,314 | 54.43 | | |
| Amsterdam IV | Z. van den Bergh | Free-thinking Democratic League | 647 | 26.80 | | |
| Amsterdam IV | M. Mendels | Social Democratic Workers' Party | 245 | 10.15 | | |
| Amsterdam IV | E. P. F. A. van den Bogaert | Catholic | 208 | 8.62 | | |
| Amsterdam IV | Valid votes | | 2,414 | 97.34 | | |
| Amsterdam IV | Invalid/blank votes | | 66 | 2.66 | | |
| Amsterdam IV | Total votes | | 2,480 | 100 | | |
| Amsterdam IV | Registered voters/turnout | | 3,634 | 68.24 | | |
| Amsterdam V | T. M. Ketelaar | Free-thinking Democratic League | 2,300 | 42.64 | 2,939 | 51.16 |
| Amsterdam V | J. Deen | Liberal Union | 1,243 | 23.04 | 2,806 | 48.84 |
| Amsterdam V | P. W. Sutorius | Catholic | 1,182 | 21.91 | | |
| Amsterdam V | H. P. C. W. H. J. B. van Son | Christian Historical Voters' League | 387 | 7.17 | | |
| Amsterdam V | P. L. Tak | Social Democratic Workers' Party | 282 | 5.23 | | |
| Amsterdam V | Valid votes | | 5,394 | 98.81 | 5,745 | 99.26 |
| Amsterdam V | Invalid/blank votes | | 65 | 1.19 | 43 | 0.74 |
| Amsterdam V | Total votes | | 5,459 | 100 | 5,788 | 100 |
| Amsterdam V | Registered voters/turnout | | 7,840 | 69.63 | 7,840 | 73.83 |
| Amsterdam VI | C. J. den Tex | Liberal Union | 1,486 | 44.68 | 1,936 | 55.44 |
| Amsterdam VI | H. W. van Marle | Anti-Revolutionary Party | 1,362 | 40.95 | 1,556 | 44.56 |
| Amsterdam VI | C. T. van Deventer | Free-thinking Democratic League | 248 | 7.46 | | |
| Amsterdam VI | P. J. Troelstra | Social Democratic Workers' Party | 230 | 6.92 | | |
| Amsterdam VI | Valid votes | | 3,326 | 96.46 | 3,492 | 98.59 |
| Amsterdam VI | Invalid/blank votes | | 122 | 3.54 | 50 | 1.41 |
| Amsterdam VI | Total votes | | 3,448 | 100 | 3,542 | 100 |
| Amsterdam VI | Registered voters/turnout | | 5,148 | 66.98 | 5,148 | 68.80 |
| Amsterdam VII | Th. Heemskerk | Anti-Revolutionary Party | 1,477 | 56.35 | | |
| Amsterdam VII | B. H. Heldt | Free-thinking Democratic League | 1,022 | 38.99 | | |
| Amsterdam VII | H. H. Wollring | Social Democratic Workers' Party | 122 | 4.65 | | |
| Amsterdam VII | Valid votes | | 2,621 | 98.20 | | |
| Amsterdam VII | Invalid/blank votes | | 48 | 1.80 | | |
| Amsterdam VII | Total votes | | 2,669 | 100 | | |
| Amsterdam VII | Registered voters/turnout | | 3,805 | 70.14 | | |
| Amsterdam VIII | P. Nolting | Free-thinking Democratic League | 596 | 31.25 | 1,217 | 53.97 |
| Amsterdam VIII | A. Kuyper | Anti-Revolutionary Party | 574 | 30.10 | 1,038 | 46.03 |
| Amsterdam VIII | A. J. C. J. S. Bergsma | Liberal Union | 334 | 17.51 | | |
| Amsterdam VIII | P. H. van Outersterp | Catholic | 301 | 15.78 | | |
| Amsterdam VIII | F. U. Schmidt | Social Democratic Workers' Party | 102 | 5.35 | | |
| Amsterdam VIII | Valid votes | | 1,907 | 95.73 | 2,255 | 99.08 |
| Amsterdam VIII | Invalid/blank votes | | 85 | 4.27 | 21 | 0.92 |
| Amsterdam VIII | Total votes | | 1,992 | 100 | 2,276 | 100 |
| Amsterdam VIII | Registered voters/turnout | | 2,987 | 66.69 | 2,987 | 76.20 |
| Amsterdam IX | H. Byleveld | Independent | 1,532 | 34.07 | 2,058 | 41.76 |
| Amsterdam IX | C. Lely | Liberal Union | 1,289 | 28.66 | 2,870 | 58.24 |
| Amsterdam IX | A. H. Gerhard | Social Democratic Workers' Party | 877 | 19.50 | | |
| Amsterdam IX | J. A. van Gilse | Free-thinking Democratic League | 799 | 17.77 | | |
| Amsterdam IX | Valid votes | | 4,497 | 96.48 | 4,928 | 98.74 |
| Amsterdam IX | Invalid/blank votes | | 164 | 3.52 | 63 | 1.26 |
| Amsterdam IX | Total votes | | 4,661 | 100 | 4,991 | 100 |
| Amsterdam IX | Registered voters/turnout | | 7,935 | 58.74 | 7,935 | 62.90 |
| Apeldoorn | W. K. F. P. graaf van Bylandt | Free Anti Revolutionary Party | 3,013 | 59.26 | | |
| Apeldoorn | H. P. de Kanter | Liberal Union | 2,071 | 40.74 | | |
| Apeldoorn | Valid votes | | 5,084 | 99.05 | | |
| Apeldoorn | Invalid/blank votes | | 49 | 0.95 | | |
| Apeldoorn | Total votes | | 5,133 | 100 | | |
| Apeldoorn | Registered voters/turnout | | 7,192 | 71.37 | | |
| Appingedam | J. van der Molen Tz. | Anti-Revolutionary Party | 1,910 | 35.82 | 2,306 | 42.59 |
| Appingedam | J. H. A. Schaper | Social Democratic Workers' Party | 1,859 | 34.86 | 3,108 | 57.41 |
| Appingedam | J. Schepel | Liberal Union | 1,563 | 29.31 | | |
| Appingedam | Valid votes | | 5,332 | 98.89 | 5,414 | 99.28 |
| Appingedam | Invalid/blank votes | | 60 | 1.11 | 39 | 0.72 |
| Appingedam | Total votes | | 5,392 | 100 | 5,453 | 100 |
| Appingedam | Registered voters/turnout | | 6,729 | 80.13 | 6,729 | 81.04 |
| Arnhem | P. Rink | Liberal Union | 2,047 | 49.48 | 2,496 | 57.76 |
| Arnhem | J. S. F. van Hoogstraten | Anti-Revolutionary Party | 1,585 | 38.31 | 1,825 | 42.24 |
| Arnhem | B. Reyndorp | Social Democratic Workers' Party | 505 | 12.21 | | |
| Arnhem | Valid votes | | 4,137 | 97.30 | 4,321 | 98.97 |
| Arnhem | Invalid/blank votes | | 115 | 2.70 | 45 | 1.03 |
| Arnhem | Total votes | | 4,252 | 100 | 4,366 | 100 |
| Arnhem | Registered voters/turnout | | 5,415 | 78.52 | 5,415 | 80.63 |
| Assen | J. J. Willinge | Liberal Union | 1,468 | 75.32 | | |
| Assen | P. van Vliet | Anti-Revolutionary Party | 481 | 24.68 | | |
| Assen | Valid votes | | 1,949 | 98.09 | | |
| Assen | Invalid/blank votes | | 38 | 1.91 | | |
| Assen | Total votes | | 1,987 | 100 | | |
| Assen | Registered voters/turnout | | 6,182 | 32.14 | | |
| Bergen op Zoom | L. D. J. L. de Ram | Catholic | 2,696 | 83.55 | | |
| Bergen op Zoom | H. P. de Kanter | Liberal Union | 531 | 16.45 | | |
| Bergen op Zoom | Valid votes | | 3,227 | 97.82 | | |
| Bergen op Zoom | Invalid/blank votes | | 72 | 2.18 | | |
| Bergen op Zoom | Total votes | | 3,299 | 100 | | |
| Bergen op Zoom | Registered voters/turnout | | 6,482 | 50.89 | | |
| Beverwijk | W. C. J. Passtoors | Catholic | 3,885 | 50.46 | | |
| Beverwijk | J. van Loenen Martinet | Free-thinking Democratic League | 3,814 | 49.54 | | |
| Beverwijk | Valid votes | | 7,699 | 99.28 | | |
| Beverwijk | Invalid/blank votes | | 56 | 0.72 | | |
| Beverwijk | Total votes | | 7,755 | 100 | | |
| Beverwijk | Registered voters/turnout | | 8,381 | 92.53 | | |
| Bodegraven | A. Knijff | Liberal Union | 2,475 | 41.06 | 2,624 | 41.66 |
| Bodegraven | J. W. H. M. van Idsinga | Free Anti Revolutionary Party | 2,034 | 33.74 | 3,675 | 58.34 |
| Bodegraven | J. H. de Waal Malefijt | Anti-Revolutionary Party | 1,519 | 25.20 | | |
| Bodegraven | Valid votes | | 6,028 | 98.58 | 6,299 | 99.48 |
| Bodegraven | Invalid/blank votes | | 87 | 1.42 | 33 | 0.52 |
| Bodegraven | Total votes | | 6,115 | 100 | 6,332 | 100 |
| Bodegraven | Registered voters/turnout | | 7,160 | 85.41 | 7,160 | 88.44 |
| Breda | L. P. M. H. baron van Michiels van Verduynen | Catholic | 1,579 | 74.91 | | |
| Breda | J. Brinkhuis | Catholic Democrat | 529 | 25.09 | | |
| Breda | Valid votes | | 2,108 | 97.59 | | |
| Breda | Invalid/blank votes | | 52 | 2.41 | | |
| Breda | Total votes | | 2,160 | 100 | | |
| Breda | Registered voters/turnout | | 6,152 | 35.11 | | |
| Breukelen | F. J. A. M. Wierdels | Catholic | 1,944 | 36.05 | 2,357 | 43.11 |
| Breukelen | J. H. de Waal Malefijt | Anti-Revolutionary Party | 1,765 | 32.73 | 3,111 | 56.89 |
| Breukelen | H. J. Doude van Troostwijk | Christian Historical Voters' League | 903 | 16.75 | | |
| Breukelen | W. P. Ruijsch | Liberal Union | 780 | 14.47 | | |
| Breukelen | Valid votes | | 5,392 | 97.12 | 5,468 | 98.68 |
| Breukelen | Invalid/blank votes | | 160 | 2.88 | 73 | 1.32 |
| Breukelen | Total votes | | 5,552 | 100 | 5,541 | 100 |
| Breukelen | Registered voters/turnout | | 6,710 | 82.74 | 6,710 | 82.58 |
| Brielle | G. J. Goekoop | Free Liberals | 1,979 | 43.88 | 2,446 | 50.62 |
| Brielle | H. C. Vegtel | Anti-Revolutionary Party | 1,936 | 42.93 | 2,386 | 49.38 |
| Brielle | L. M. Hermans | Social Democratic Workers' Party | 595 | 13.19 | | |
| Brielle | Valid votes | | 4,510 | 98.95 | 4,832 | 99.06 |
| Brielle | Invalid/blank votes | | 48 | 1.05 | 46 | 0.94 |
| Brielle | Total votes | | 4,558 | 100 | 4,878 | 100 |
| Brielle | Registered voters/turnout | | 5,505 | 82.80 | 5,505 | 88.61 |
| Delft | H. A. van de Velde | Anti-Revolutionary Party | 2,464 | 58.42 | | |
| Delft | W. T. C. van Doorn | Liberal Union | 1,196 | 28.35 | | |
| Delft | J. A. Bergmeyer | Social Democratic Workers' Party | 558 | 13.23 | | |
| Delft | Valid votes | | 4,218 | 98.69 | | |
| Delft | Invalid/blank votes | | 56 | 1.31 | | |
| Delft | Total votes | | 4,274 | 100 | | |
| Delft | Registered voters/turnout | | 5,661 | 75.50 | | |
| Den Bosch | J. A. Loeff | Catholic | 1,636 | 77.06 | | |
| Den Bosch | D. de Klerk | Liberal Union | 487 | 22.94 | | |
| Den Bosch | Valid votes | | 2,123 | 98.24 | | |
| Den Bosch | Invalid/blank votes | | 38 | 1.76 | | |
| Den Bosch | Total votes | | 2,161 | 100 | | |
| Den Bosch | Registered voters/turnout | | 4,732 | 45.67 | | |
| Den Haag I | J. Krap | Anti-Revolutionary Party | 1,643 | 40.51 | 2,172 | 50.09 |
| Den Haag I | W. Dolk | Liberal Union | 1,307 | 32.22 | 2,164 | 49.91 |
| Den Haag I | J. A. Bergmeyer | Social Democratic Workers' Party | 681 | 16.79 | | |
| Den Haag I | D. van Houten | Free Liberals | 344 | 8.48 | | |
| Den Haag I | F. Mol | Free-thinking Democratic League | 81 | 2.00 | | |
| Den Haag I | Valid votes | | 4,056 | 97.76 | 4,336 | 99.09 |
| Den Haag I | Invalid/blank votes | | 93 | 2.24 | 40 | 0.91 |
| Den Haag I | Total votes | | 4,149 | 100 | 4,376 | 100 |
| Den Haag I | Registered voters/turnout | | 6,345 | 65.39 | 6,345 | 68.97 |
| Den Haag II | J. F. W. Conrad | Free Liberals | 2,536 | 55.59 | | |
| Den Haag II | W. B. van Liefland | Catholic | 1,862 | 40.82 | | |
| Den Haag II | P. J. in de Betou | Free-thinking Democratic League | 164 | 3.59 | | |
| Den Haag II | Valid votes | | 4,562 | 98.32 | | |
| Den Haag II | Invalid/blank votes | | 78 | 1.68 | | |
| Den Haag II | Total votes | | 4,640 | 100 | | |
| Den Haag II | Registered voters/turnout | | 6,809 | 68.15 | | |
| Den Haag III | J. M. Pijnacker Hordijk | Liberal Union | 2,434 | 53.71 | | |
| Den Haag III | G. J. C. A. Pop | Liberal Union | 1,331 | 29.37 | | |
| Den Haag III | A. Hoogenraad | Anti-Revolutionary Party | 767 | 16.92 | | |
| Den Haag III | Valid votes | | 4,532 | 98.41 | | |
| Den Haag III | Invalid/blank votes | | 73 | 1.59 | | |
| Den Haag III | Total votes | | 4,605 | 100 | | |
| Den Haag III | Registered voters/turnout | | 7,014 | 65.65 | | |
| Den Helder | A. P. Staalman | Anti-Revolutionary Party | 2,683 | 51.53 | | |
| Den Helder | C. S. Jaring | Liberal Union | 2,138 | 41.06 | | |
| Den Helder | F. W. N. Hugenholtz | Social Democratic Workers' Party | 386 | 7.41 | | |
| Den Helder | Valid votes | | 5,207 | 99.16 | | |
| Den Helder | Invalid/blank votes | | 44 | 0.84 | | |
| Den Helder | Total votes | | 5,251 | 100 | | |
| Den Helder | Registered voters/turnout | | 6,816 | 77.04 | | |
| Deventer | H. P. Marchant | Free-thinking Democratic League | 2,892 | 76.03 | | |
| Deventer | P. W. van der Sleyden | Free Liberals | 912 | 23.97 | | |
| Deventer | Valid votes | | 3,804 | 98.55 | | |
| Deventer | Invalid/blank votes | | 56 | 1.45 | | |
| Deventer | Total votes | | 3,860 | 100 | | |
| Deventer | Registered voters/turnout | | 6,527 | 59.14 | | |
| Doetinchem | P. van Vliet | Anti-Revolutionary Party | 4,354 | 56.14 | | |
| Doetinchem | H. F. Hesselink van Suchtelen | Liberal Union | 2,930 | 37.78 | | |
| Doetinchem | W. P. G. Helsdingen | Social Democratic Workers' Party | 312 | 4.02 | | |
| Doetinchem | W. H. E. van der Borch van Verwolde | Independent | 160 | 2.06 | | |
| Doetinchem | Valid votes | | 7,756 | 98.18 | | |
| Doetinchem | Invalid/blank votes | | 144 | 1.82 | | |
| Doetinchem | Total votes | | 7,900 | 100 | | |
| Doetinchem | Registered voters/turnout | | 8,841 | 89.36 | | |
| Dokkum | R. van Veen | Free Anti Revolutionary Party | 2,836 | 57.72 | | |
| Dokkum | E. Schaafsma | Liberal Union | 1,420 | 28.90 | | |
| Dokkum | G. W. Melchers | Social Democratic Workers' Party | 657 | 13.37 | | |
| Dokkum | Valid votes | | 4,913 | 98.99 | | |
| Dokkum | Invalid/blank votes | | 50 | 1.01 | | |
| Dokkum | Total votes | | 4,963 | 100 | | |
| Dokkum | Registered voters/turnout | | 5,872 | 84.52 | | |
| Dordrecht | S. M. H. van Gijn | Liberal Union | 2,100 | 45.00 | 2,565 | 51.51 |
| Dordrecht | J. M. Rens | Anti-Revolutionary Party | 1,804 | 38.65 | 2,415 | 48.49 |
| Dordrecht | J. A. Bergmeyer | Social Democratic Workers' Party | 763 | 16.35 | | |
| Dordrecht | Valid votes | | 4,667 | 98.58 | 4,980 | 99.05 |
| Dordrecht | Invalid/blank votes | | 67 | 1.42 | 48 | 0.95 |
| Dordrecht | Total votes | | 4,734 | 100 | 5,028 | 100 |
| Dordrecht | Registered voters/turnout | | 6,161 | 76.84 | 6,161 | 81.61 |
| Druten | J. A. N. Travaglino | Catholic | Unopposed | | | |
| Ede | L. H. J. M. van Asch van Wijck | Anti-Revolutionary Party | Unopposed | | | |
| Eindhoven | V. A. M. van den Heuvel | Catholic | 2,388 | 66.41 | | |
| Eindhoven | A. F. C. M. Raupp | Catholic | 1,208 | 33.59 | | |
| Eindhoven | Valid votes | | 3,596 | 98.47 | | |
| Eindhoven | Invalid/blank votes | | 56 | 1.53 | | |
| Eindhoven | Total votes | | 3,652 | 100 | | |
| Eindhoven | Registered voters/turnout | | 6,156 | 59.32 | | |
| Elst | J. W. Bergansius | Catholic | 3,089 | 57.08 | | |
| Elst | P. Rink | Liberal Union | 956 | 17.66 | | |
| Elst | A. D. Duys | Anti-Revolutionary Party | 890 | 16.44 | | |
| Elst | W. baron van Voorst tot Voorst | Catholic | 353 | 6.52 | | |
| Elst | B. Reyndorp | Social Democratic Workers' Party | 124 | 2.29 | | |
| Elst | Valid votes | | 5,412 | 95.70 | | |
| Elst | Invalid/blank votes | | 243 | 4.30 | | |
| Elst | Total votes | | 5,655 | 100 | | |
| Elst | Registered voters/turnout | | 6,819 | 82.93 | | |
| Emmen | P. H. Roessingh | Liberal Union | 1,854 | 82.80 | | |
| Emmen | Th. Heemskerk | Anti-Revolutionary Party | 385 | 17.20 | | |
| Emmen | Valid votes | | 2,239 | 98.72 | | |
| Emmen | Invalid/blank votes | | 29 | 1.28 | | |
| Emmen | Total votes | | 2,268 | 100 | | |
| Emmen | Registered voters/turnout | | 5,421 | 41.84 | | |
| Enkhuizen | N. Sluis Pzn. | Anti-Revolutionary Party | 3,686 | 50.18 | | |
| Enkhuizen | A. Kool II | Independent | 3,415 | 46.49 | | |
| Enkhuizen | A. H. Gerhard | Social Democratic Workers' Party | 244 | 3.32 | | |
| Enkhuizen | Valid votes | | 7,345 | 98.63 | | |
| Enkhuizen | Invalid/blank votes | | 102 | 1.37 | | |
| Enkhuizen | Total votes | | 7,447 | 100 | | |
| Enkhuizen | Registered voters/turnout | | 8,005 | 93.03 | | |
| Enschede | P. J. M. Aalberse | Catholic | 4,256 | 43.22 | 4,593 | 47.07 |
| Enschede | H. H. van Kol | Social Democratic Workers' Party | 3,321 | 33.72 | 5,165 | 52.93 |
| Enschede | E. B. Kielstra | Free Liberals | 2,271 | 23.06 | | |
| Enschede | Valid votes | | 9,848 | 99.21 | 9,758 | 98.70 |
| Enschede | Invalid/blank votes | | 78 | 0.79 | 129 | 1.30 |
| Enschede | Total votes | | 9,926 | 100 | 9,887 | 100 |
| Enschede | Registered voters/turnout | | 10,639 | 93.30 | 10,639 | 92.93 |
| Franeker | J. P. Vergouwen | Anti-Revolutionary Party | 2,153 | 40.26 | 2,332 | 43.68 |
| Franeker | F. Lieftinck | Liberal Union | 1,668 | 31.19 | 3,007 | 56.32 |
| Franeker | P. J. Troelstra | Social Democratic Workers' Party | 1,527 | 28.55 | | |
| Franeker | Valid votes | | 5,348 | 99.46 | 5,339 | 99.63 |
| Franeker | Invalid/blank votes | | 29 | 0.54 | 20 | 0.37 |
| Franeker | Total votes | | 5,377 | 100 | 5,359 | 100 |
| Franeker | Registered voters/turnout | | 6,226 | 86.36 | 6,226 | 86.07 |
| Goes | A. F. de Savornin Lohman | Free Anti Revolutionary Party | 2,582 | 61.67 | | |
| Goes | G. A. Vorsterman van Oyen | Liberal Union | 1,605 | 38.33 | | |
| Goes | Valid votes | | 4,187 | 98.89 | | |
| Goes | Invalid/blank votes | | 47 | 1.11 | | |
| Goes | Total votes | | 4,234 | 100 | | |
| Goes | Registered voters/turnout | | 5,532 | 76.54 | | |
| Gorinchem | H. Seret | Anti-Revolutionary Party | 2,432 | 62.78 | | |
| Gorinchem | D. de Klerk | Liberal Union | 1,210 | 31.23 | | |
| Gorinchem | W. H. E. van der Borch van Verwolde | Independent | 232 | 5.99 | | |
| Gorinchem | Valid votes | | 3,874 | 95.91 | | |
| Gorinchem | Invalid/blank votes | | 165 | 4.09 | | |
| Gorinchem | Total votes | | 4,039 | 100 | | |
| Gorinchem | Registered voters/turnout | | 5,910 | 68.34 | | |
| Gouda | Th. Heemskerk | Anti-Revolutionary Party | 1,818 | 37.57 | 2,769 | 54.71 |
| Gouda | C. J. E. graaf van Bylandt | Free Liberals | 1,588 | 32.82 | 2,292 | 45.29 |
| Gouda | J. H. de Waal Malefijt | Anti-Revolutionary Party | 712 | 14.71 | | |
| Gouda | F. Mol | Free-thinking Democratic League | 508 | 10.50 | | |
| Gouda | H. Gorter | Social Democratic Workers' Party | 213 | 4.40 | | |
| Gouda | Valid votes | | 4,839 | 98.41 | 5,061 | 99.53 |
| Gouda | Invalid/blank votes | | 78 | 1.59 | 24 | 0.47 |
| Gouda | Total votes | | 4,917 | 100 | 5,085 | 100 |
| Gouda | Registered voters/turnout | | 6,072 | 80.98 | 6,072 | 83.75 |
| Grave | J. J. I. Harte van Tecklenburg | Catholic | Unopposed | | | |
| Groningen | H. L. Drucker | Free-thinking Democratic League | 2,481 | 47.86 | 3,176 | 64.63 |
| Groningen | S. van Houten | Free Liberals | 1,428 | 27.55 | 1,738 | 35.37 |
| Groningen | W. P. G. Helsdingen | Social Democratic Workers' Party | 704 | 13.58 | | |
| Groningen | N. de Ridder | Anti-Revolutionary Party | 571 | 11.01 | | |
| Groningen | Valid votes | | 5,184 | 98.91 | 4,914 | 99.39 |
| Groningen | Invalid/blank votes | | 57 | 1.09 | 30 | 0.61 |
| Groningen | Total votes | | 5,241 | 100 | 4,944 | 100 |
| Groningen | Registered voters/turnout | | 6,424 | 81.58 | 6,424 | 76.96 |
| Gulpen | J. M. M. H. Merkelbach | Catholic | 1,695 | 82.48 | | |
| Gulpen | L. H. L. J. van der Maesen de Sombreff | Catholic | 360 | 17.52 | | |
| Gulpen | Valid votes | | 2,055 | 97.58 | | |
| Gulpen | Invalid/blank votes | | 51 | 2.42 | | |
| Gulpen | Total votes | | 2,106 | 100 | | |
| Gulpen | Registered voters/turnout | | 6,029 | 34.93 | | |
| Haarlem | F. W. van Styrum | Free Liberals | 1,778 | 35.21 | 3,135 | 63.14 |
| Haarlem | W. A. J. van de Kamp | Catholic | 1,480 | 29.31 | 1,830 | 36.86 |
| Haarlem | F. W. N. Hugenholtz | Social Democratic Workers' Party | 1,301 | 25.76 | | |
| Haarlem | N. Oosterbaan | Anti-Revolutionary Party | 491 | 9.72 | | |
| Haarlem | Valid votes | | 5,050 | 97.27 | 4,965 | 99.24 |
| Haarlem | Invalid/blank votes | | 142 | 2.73 | 38 | 0.76 |
| Haarlem | Total votes | | 5,192 | 100 | 5,003 | 100 |
| Haarlem | Registered voters/turnout | | 7,133 | 72.79 | 7,133 | 70.14 |
| Haarlemmermeer | F. H. van Wichen | Catholic | 3,103 | 46.03 | 3,498 | 50.10 |
| Haarlemmermeer | G. B. 't Hooft | Anti-Revolutionary Party | 2,113 | 31.35 | 3,484 | 49.90 |
| Haarlemmermeer | J. H. Wentholt | Liberal Union | 1,160 | 17.21 | | |
| Haarlemmermeer | P. Nolting | Free-thinking Democratic League | 365 | 5.41 | | |
| Haarlemmermeer | Valid votes | | 6,741 | 97.92 | 6,982 | 99.30 |
| Haarlemmermeer | Invalid/blank votes | | 143 | 2.08 | 49 | 0.70 |
| Haarlemmermeer | Total votes | | 6,884 | 100 | 7,031 | 100 |
| Haarlemmermeer | Registered voters/turnout | | 8,132 | 84.65 | 8,132 | 86.46 |
| Harlingen | J. Schokking | Frisian League | 2,978 | 56.08 | | |
| Harlingen | A. Bouman | Liberal Union | 2,332 | 43.92 | | |
| Harlingen | Valid votes | | 5,310 | 99.16 | | |
| Harlingen | Invalid/blank votes | | 45 | 0.84 | | |
| Harlingen | Total votes | | 5,355 | 100 | | |
| Harlingen | Registered voters/turnout | | 6,034 | 88.75 | | |
| Helmond | K. Raymakers | Catholic | Unopposed | | | |
| Hilversum | F. J. M. A. Reekers | Catholic | 1,710 | 30.13 | 2,257 | 41.07 |
| Hilversum | S. baron van Heemstra II | Anti-Revolutionary Party | 1,262 | 22.24 | 3,239 | 58.93 |
| Hilversum | J. J. B. Fanoy | Free Anti Revolutionary Party | 1,235 | 21.76 | | |
| Hilversum | J. van Loenen Martinet | Free-thinking Democratic League | 892 | 15.72 | | |
| Hilversum | H. Gorter | Social Democratic Workers' Party | 576 | 10.15 | | |
| Hilversum | Valid votes | | 5,675 | 97.84 | 5,496 | 98.09 |
| Hilversum | Invalid/blank votes | | 125 | 2.16 | 107 | 1.91 |
| Hilversum | Total votes | | 5,800 | 100 | 5,603 | 100 |
| Hilversum | Registered voters/turnout | | 7,789 | 74.46 | 7,789 | 71.93 |
| Hontenisse | P. F. Fruijtier | Catholic | 1,689 | 35.37 | 2,578 | 52.02 |
| Hontenisse | J. G. van Deinse | Liberal Union | 1,566 | 32.80 | 2,378 | 47.98 |
| Hontenisse | Th. Heemskerk | Anti-Revolutionary Party | 1,520 | 31.83 | | |
| Hontenisse | Valid votes | | 4,775 | 98.76 | 4,956 | 98.37 |
| Hontenisse | Invalid/blank votes | | 60 | 1.24 | 82 | 1.63 |
| Hontenisse | Total votes | | 4,835 | 100 | 5,038 | 100 |
| Hontenisse | Registered voters/turnout | | 5,814 | 83.16 | 5,814 | 86.65 |
| Hoogezand | K. ter Laan | Social Democratic Workers' Party | 1,486 | 41.23 | 2,333 | 60.61 |
| Hoogezand | J. W. Rudolph | Anti-Revolutionary Party | 1,102 | 30.58 | 1,516 | 39.39 |
| Hoogezand | J. D. Veegens | Liberal Union | 1,016 | 28.19 | | |
| Hoogezand | Valid votes | | 3,604 | 97.46 | 3,849 | 99.15 |
| Hoogezand | Invalid/blank votes | | 94 | 2.54 | 33 | 0.85 |
| Hoogezand | Total votes | | 3,698 | 100 | 3,882 | 100 |
| Hoogezand | Registered voters/turnout | | 5,410 | 68.35 | 5,410 | 71.76 |
| Hoorn | P. B. J. Ferf | Liberal Union | 2,580 | 58.94 | | |
| Hoorn | F. J. A. M. Wierdels | Catholic | 1,167 | 26.66 | | |
| Hoorn | J. de Vries | Social Democratic Workers' Party | 630 | 14.39 | | |
| Hoorn | Valid votes | | 4,377 | 97.88 | | |
| Hoorn | Invalid/blank votes | | 95 | 2.12 | | |
| Hoorn | Total votes | | 4,472 | 100 | | |
| Hoorn | Registered voters/turnout | | 6,481 | 69.00 | | |
| Kampen | Æ. baron van Mackay Jr. | Anti-Revolutionary Party | 2,404 | 58.98 | | |
| Kampen | F. O. van der Dussen | Liberal Union | 1,672 | 41.02 | | |
| Kampen | Valid votes | | 4,076 | 99.20 | | |
| Kampen | Invalid/blank votes | | 33 | 0.80 | | |
| Kampen | Total votes | | 4,109 | 100 | | |
| Kampen | Registered voters/turnout | | 5,637 | 72.89 | | |
| Katwijk | P. J. M. Aalberse | Catholic | 2,347 | 42.60 | 2,574 | 45.74 |
| Katwijk | O. J. E. baron van Wassenaer van Catwijck | Free Anti Revolutionary Party | 1,439 | 26.12 | 3,053 | 54.26 |
| Katwijk | S. baron van Heemstra II | Anti-Revolutionary Party | 1,401 | 25.43 | | |
| Katwijk | H. H. van Waveren | Liberal Union | 323 | 5.86 | | |
| Katwijk | Valid votes | | 5,510 | 96.58 | 5,627 | 99.63 |
| Katwijk | Invalid/blank votes | | 195 | 3.42 | 21 | 0.37 |
| Katwijk | Total votes | | 5,705 | 100 | 5,648 | 100 |
| Katwijk | Registered voters/turnout | | 6,568 | 86.86 | 6,568 | 85.99 |
| Leeuwarden | G. W. Melchers | Social Democratic Workers' Party | 1,705 | 36.10 | 2,371 | 52.47 |
| Leeuwarden | H. Pyttersen | Liberal Union | 1,439 | 30.47 | 2,148 | 47.53 |
| Leeuwarden | T. de Vries | Anti-Revolutionary Party | 1,121 | 23.73 | | |
| Leeuwarden | Z. van den Bergh | Free-thinking Democratic League | 458 | 9.70 | | |
| Leeuwarden | Valid votes | | 4,723 | 99.10 | 4,519 | 99.32 |
| Leeuwarden | Invalid/blank votes | | 43 | 0.90 | 31 | 0.68 |
| Leeuwarden | Total votes | | 4,766 | 100 | 4,550 | 100 |
| Leeuwarden | Registered voters/turnout | | 6,065 | 78.58 | 6,065 | 75.02 |
| Leiden | A. E. van Kempen | Anti-Revolutionary Party | 2,164 | 54.51 | | |
| Leiden | H. L. Drucker | Free-thinking Democratic League | 1,084 | 27.30 | | |
| Leiden | W. van der Kaay | Free Liberals | 722 | 18.19 | | |
| Leiden | Valid votes | | 3,970 | 98.66 | | |
| Leiden | Invalid/blank votes | | 54 | 1.34 | | |
| Leiden | Total votes | | 4,024 | 100 | | |
| Leiden | Registered voters/turnout | | 4,741 | 84.88 | | |
| Lochem | C. Lely | Liberal Union | 2,936 | 49.18 | 3,731 | 60.70 |
| Lochem | H. W. van Asch van Wijck | Anti-Revolutionary Party | 2,242 | 37.55 | 2,416 | 39.30 |
| Lochem | W. P. G. Helsdingen | Social Democratic Workers' Party | 792 | 13.27 | | |
| Lochem | Valid votes | | 5,970 | 97.52 | 6,147 | 98.64 |
| Lochem | Invalid/blank votes | | 152 | 2.48 | 85 | 1.36 |
| Lochem | Total votes | | 6,122 | 100 | 6,232 | 100 |
| Lochem | Registered voters/turnout | | 7,553 | 81.05 | 7,553 | 82.51 |
| Loosduinen | J. W. J. C. M. van Nispen tot Sevenaer | Catholic | 2,106 | 39.28 | 2,491 | 48.53 |
| Loosduinen | A. Brummelkamp jr. | Anti-Revolutionary Party | 1,817 | 33.89 | 2,642 | 51.47 |
| Loosduinen | J. Pattist | Liberal Union | 1,016 | 18.95 | | |
| Loosduinen | J. D. Six | Free Anti Revolutionary Party | 423 | 7.89 | | |
| Loosduinen | Valid votes | | 5,362 | 96.93 | 5,133 | 98.43 |
| Loosduinen | Invalid/blank votes | | 170 | 3.07 | 82 | 1.57 |
| Loosduinen | Total votes | | 5,532 | 100 | 5,215 | 100 |
| Loosduinen | Registered voters/turnout | | 6,917 | 79.98 | 6,917 | 75.39 |
| Maastricht | M. de Ras | Catholic | 2,522 | 75.51 | | |
| Maastricht | S. P. Baart | Social Democratic Workers' Party | 818 | 24.49 | | |
| Maastricht | Valid votes | | 3,340 | 97.63 | | |
| Maastricht | Invalid/blank votes | | 81 | 2.37 | | |
| Maastricht | Total votes | | 3,421 | 100 | | |
| Maastricht | Registered voters/turnout | | 4,995 | 68.49 | | |
| Meppel | H. Smeenge | Liberal Union | 2,407 | 55.74 | | |
| Meppel | H. Verkouteren | Christian Historical Voters' League | 1,785 | 41.34 | | |
| Meppel | F. Pomp | Social Democratic Workers' Party | 126 | 2.92 | | |
| Meppel | Valid votes | | 4,318 | 97.60 | | |
| Meppel | Invalid/blank votes | | 106 | 2.40 | | |
| Meppel | Total votes | | 4,424 | 100 | | |
| Meppel | Registered voters/turnout | | 5,417 | 81.67 | | |
| Middelburg | C. Lucasse | Anti-Revolutionary Party | 3,279 | 52.01 | | |
| Middelburg | A. Smit | Liberal Union | 2,329 | 36.94 | | |
| Middelburg | J. A. Bergmeyer | Social Democratic Workers' Party | 697 | 11.05 | | |
| Middelburg | Valid votes | | 6,305 | 98.56 | | |
| Middelburg | Invalid/blank votes | | 92 | 1.44 | | |
| Middelburg | Total votes | | 6,397 | 100 | | |
| Middelburg | Registered voters/turnout | | 7,770 | 82.33 | | |
| Nijmegen | O. F. A. M. van Nispen tot Sevenaer | Catholic | 2,547 | 68.03 | | |
| Nijmegen | H. P. de Wilde | Free-thinking Democratic League | 1,197 | 31.97 | | |
| Nijmegen | Valid votes | | 3,744 | 97.91 | | |
| Nijmegen | Invalid/blank votes | | 80 | 2.09 | | |
| Nijmegen | Total votes | | 3,824 | 100 | | |
| Nijmegen | Registered voters/turnout | | 5,703 | 67.05 | | |
| Ommen | J. van Alphen | Anti-Revolutionary Party | 2,672 | 65.25 | | |
| Ommen | T. M. Wentholt | Liberal Union | 1,423 | 34.75 | | |
| Ommen | Valid votes | | 4,095 | 98.08 | | |
| Ommen | Invalid/blank votes | | 80 | 1.92 | | |
| Ommen | Total votes | | 4,175 | 100 | | |
| Ommen | Registered voters/turnout | | 5,997 | 69.62 | | |
| Oostburg | P. C. J. Hennequin | Free Liberals | 3,067 | 60.80 | | |
| Oostburg | J. F. Heemskerk | Anti-Revolutionary Party | 1,977 | 39.20 | | |
| Oostburg | Valid votes | | 5,044 | 98.15 | | |
| Oostburg | Invalid/blank votes | | 95 | 1.85 | | |
| Oostburg | Total votes | | 5,139 | 100 | | |
| Oostburg | Registered voters/turnout | | 6,578 | 78.12 | | |
| Oosterhout | I. B. D. van den Berch van Heemstede | Catholic | Unopposed | | | |
| Rheden | M. J. C. M. Kolkman | Catholic | 2,811 | 74.35 | | |
| Rheden | B. Cuperus | Liberal Union | 970 | 25.65 | | |
| Rheden | Valid votes | | 3,781 | 97.78 | | |
| Rheden | Invalid/blank votes | | 86 | 2.22 | | |
| Rheden | Total votes | | 3,867 | 100 | | |
| Rheden | Registered voters/turnout | | 6,419 | 60.24 | | |
| Ridderkerk | A. P. R. C. baron van Borch van Verwolde | Anti-Revolutionary Party | 2,795 | 60.79 | | |
| Ridderkerk | D. de Klerk | Liberal Union | 1,803 | 39.21 | | |
| Ridderkerk | Valid votes | | 4,598 | 99.05 | | |
| Ridderkerk | Invalid/blank votes | | 44 | 0.95 | | |
| Ridderkerk | Total votes | | 4,642 | 100 | | |
| Ridderkerk | Registered voters/turnout | | 5,286 | 87.82 | | |
| Roermond | F. J. Bolsius | Catholic | Unopposed | | | |
| Rotterdam I | D. Fock | Liberal Union | 1,155 | 41.37 | 1,569 | 52.95 |
| Rotterdam I | J. T. de Visser | Christian Historical Voters' League | 1,023 | 36.64 | 1,394 | 47.05 |
| Rotterdam I | J. P. van Term | Catholic | 366 | 13.11 | | |
| Rotterdam I | L. M. Hermans | Social Democratic Workers' Party | 248 | 8.88 | | |
| Rotterdam I | Valid votes | | 2,792 | 98.90 | 2,963 | 99.10 |
| Rotterdam I | Invalid/blank votes | | 31 | 1.10 | 27 | 0.90 |
| Rotterdam I | Total votes | | 2,823 | 100 | 2,990 | 100 |
| Rotterdam I | Registered voters/turnout | | 3,844 | 73.44 | 3,844 | 77.78 |
| Rotterdam II | D. de Klerk | Liberal Union | 1,637 | 43.54 | 2,298 | 53.96 |
| Rotterdam II | A. de Jong | Independent | 1,548 | 41.17 | 1,961 | 46.04 |
| Rotterdam II | H. Verkouteren | Christian Historical Voters' League | 296 | 7.87 | | |
| Rotterdam II | J. G. van Kuykhof | Social Democratic Workers' Party | 279 | 7.42 | | |
| Rotterdam II | Valid votes | | 3,760 | 99.03 | 4,259 | 99.46 |
| Rotterdam II | Invalid/blank votes | | 37 | 0.97 | 23 | 0.54 |
| Rotterdam II | Total votes | | 3,797 | 100 | 4,282 | 100 |
| Rotterdam II | Registered voters/turnout | | 5,148 | 73.76 | 5,148 | 83.18 |
| Rotterdam III | J. B. Verhey | Liberal Union | 1,324 | 51.94 | | |
| Rotterdam III | C. A. H. Barge | Catholic | 826 | 32.40 | | |
| Rotterdam III | J. H. J. Quarles van Ufford | Free Anti Revolutionary Party | 233 | 9.14 | | |
| Rotterdam III | W. P. G. Helsdingen | Social Democratic Workers' Party | 166 | 6.51 | | |
| Rotterdam III | Valid votes | | 2,549 | 99.30 | | |
| Rotterdam III | Invalid/blank votes | | 18 | 0.70 | | |
| Rotterdam III | Total votes | | 2,567 | 100 | | |
| Rotterdam III | Registered voters/turnout | | 3,676 | 69.83 | | |
| Rotterdam IV | R. P. Mees R. Az. | Free Liberals | 1,574 | 49.87 | 1,810 | 54.40 |
| Rotterdam IV | D. P. D. Fabius | Anti-Revolutionary Party | 1,217 | 38.56 | 1,517 | 45.60 |
| Rotterdam IV | W. P. G. Helsdingen | Social Democratic Workers' Party | 210 | 6.65 | | |
| Rotterdam IV | H. Verkouteren | Christian Historical Voters' League | 155 | 4.91 | | |
| Rotterdam IV | Valid votes | | 3,156 | 99.06 | 3,327 | 99.28 |
| Rotterdam IV | Invalid/blank votes | | 30 | 0.94 | 24 | 0.72 |
| Rotterdam IV | Total votes | | 3,186 | 100 | 3,351 | 100 |
| Rotterdam IV | Registered voters/turnout | | 4,159 | 76.60 | 4,159 | 80.57 |
| Rotterdam V | E. E. van Raalte | Liberal Union | 876 | 31.89 | 1,683 | 61.38 |
| Rotterdam V | F. J. van Rijswijk | Catholic | 610 | 22.21 | 1,059 | 38.62 |
| Rotterdam V | S. Muller Hzn. | Liberal Union | 430 | 15.65 | | |
| Rotterdam V | J. H. de Waal Malefijt | Anti-Revolutionary Party | 409 | 14.89 | | |
| Rotterdam V | J. T. de Visser | Christian Historical Voters' League | 281 | 10.23 | | |
| Rotterdam V | J. A. Bergmeyer | Social Democratic Workers' Party | 141 | 5.13 | | |
| Rotterdam V | Valid votes | | 2,747 | 97.97 | 2,742 | 98.70 |
| Rotterdam V | Invalid/blank votes | | 57 | 2.03 | 36 | 1.30 |
| Rotterdam V | Total votes | | 2,804 | 100 | 2,778 | 100 |
| Rotterdam V | Registered voters/turnout | | 3,983 | 70.40 | 3,983 | 69.75 |
| Schiedam | A. W. F. Idenburg | Anti-Revolutionary Party | 2,088 | 47.11 | 2,142 | 49.16 |
| Schiedam | O. J. H. graaf van Limburg Stirum | Free Anti Revolutionary Party | 1,290 | 29.11 | 2,215 | 50.84 |
| Schiedam | W. P. G. Helsdingen | Social Democratic Workers' Party | 518 | 11.69 | | |
| Schiedam | C. T. van Deventer | Free-thinking Democratic League | 417 | 9.41 | | |
| Schiedam | S. van Houten | Free Liberals | 119 | 2.69 | | |
| Schiedam | Valid votes | | 4,432 | 97.51 | 4,357 | 99.14 |
| Schiedam | Invalid/blank votes | | 113 | 2.49 | 38 | 0.86 |
| Schiedam | Total votes | | 4,545 | 100 | 4,395 | 100 |
| Schiedam | Registered voters/turnout | | 5,775 | 78.70 | 5,775 | 76.10 |
| Schoterland | G. L. van der Zwaag | Social Democratic Workers' Party | 1,704 | 46.68 | 2,168 | 59.94 |
| Schoterland | J. Schokking | Frisian League | 1,012 | 27.73 | 1,449 | 40.06 |
| Schoterland | J. P. Engelman | Liberal Union | 934 | 25.59 | | |
| Schoterland | Valid votes | | 3,650 | 97.99 | 3,617 | 99.10 |
| Schoterland | Invalid/blank votes | | 75 | 2.01 | 33 | 0.90 |
| Schoterland | Total votes | | 3,725 | 100 | 3,650 | 100 |
| Schoterland | Registered voters/turnout | | 5,184 | 71.86 | 5,184 | 70.41 |
| Sittard | J. Arnoldts | Catholic | 2,052 | 51.12 | | |
| Sittard | C. C. M. H. baron van Bieberstein Rogalla Zawadsky | Catholic | 1,962 | 48.88 | | |
| Sittard | Valid votes | | 4,014 | 96.86 | | |
| Sittard | Invalid/blank votes | | 130 | 3.14 | | |
| Sittard | Total votes | | 4,144 | 100 | | |
| Sittard | Registered voters/turnout | | 6,704 | 61.81 | | |
| Sliedrecht | A. Kuyper | Anti-Revolutionary Party | 2,311 | 63.00 | | |
| Sliedrecht | D. de Klerk | Liberal Union | 1,357 | 37.00 | | |
| Sliedrecht | Valid votes | | 3,668 | 97.17 | | |
| Sliedrecht | Invalid/blank votes | | 107 | 2.83 | | |
| Sliedrecht | Total votes | | 3,775 | 100 | | |
| Sliedrecht | Registered voters/turnout | | 5,919 | 63.78 | | |
| Sneek | H. Okma | Anti-Revolutionary Party | 3,076 | 62.74 | | |
| Sneek | H. P. N. Halbertsma | Liberal Union | 1,579 | 32.20 | | |
| Sneek | O. Schriecke | Frisian League | 248 | 5.06 | | |
| Sneek | Valid votes | | 4,903 | 99.41 | | |
| Sneek | Invalid/blank votes | | 29 | 0.59 | | |
| Sneek | Total votes | | 4,932 | 100 | | |
| Sneek | Registered voters/turnout | | 6,035 | 81.72 | | |
| Steenwijk | L. F. Duymaer van Twist | Anti-Revolutionary Party | 2,545 | 58.38 | | |
| Steenwijk | J. Meesters II | Liberal Union | 1,544 | 35.42 | | |
| Steenwijk | W. P. Zeilmaker | Free-thinking Democratic League | 270 | 6.19 | | |
| Steenwijk | Valid votes | | 4,359 | 97.80 | | |
| Steenwijk | Invalid/blank votes | | 98 | 2.20 | | |
| Steenwijk | Total votes | | 4,457 | 100 | | |
| Steenwijk | Registered voters/turnout | | 5,701 | 78.18 | | |
| Tiel | M. Tydeman jr. | Free Liberals | 2,621 | 71.73 | | |
| Tiel | Th. Heemskerk | Anti-Revolutionary Party | 1,033 | 28.27 | | |
| Tiel | Valid votes | | 3,654 | 94.15 | | |
| Tiel | Invalid/blank votes | | 227 | 5.85 | | |
| Tiel | Total votes | | 3,881 | 100 | | |
| Tiel | Registered voters/turnout | | 5,639 | 68.82 | | |
| Tietjerksteradeel | A. S. Talma | Anti-Revolutionary Party | 3,025 | 55.55 | | |
| Tietjerksteradeel | P. J. Troelstra | Social Democratic Workers' Party | 1,247 | 22.90 | | |
| Tietjerksteradeel | H. P. de Kanter | Liberal Union | 1,174 | 21.56 | | |
| Tietjerksteradeel | Valid votes | | 5,446 | 99.20 | | |
| Tietjerksteradeel | Invalid/blank votes | | 44 | 0.80 | | |
| Tietjerksteradeel | Total votes | | 5,490 | 100 | | |
| Tietjerksteradeel | Registered voters/turnout | | 6,234 | 88.07 | | |
| Tilburg | J. F. Jansen | Catholic | 3,122 | 84.11 | | |
| Tilburg | J. Brinkhuis | Catholic Democrat | 590 | 15.89 | | |
| Tilburg | Valid votes | | 3,712 | 97.63 | | |
| Tilburg | Invalid/blank votes | | 90 | 2.37 | | |
| Tilburg | Total votes | | 3,802 | 100 | | |
| Tilburg | Registered voters/turnout | | 5,592 | 67.99 | | |
| Utrecht I | A. P. C. van Karnebeek | Free Liberals | 1,852 | 37.09 | 2,710 | 56.48 |
| Utrecht I | A. W. F. Idenburg | Anti-Revolutionary Party | 1,534 | 30.72 | 2,088 | 43.52 |
| Utrecht I | P. J. Troelstra | Social Democratic Workers' Party | 935 | 18.73 | | |
| Utrecht I | E. A. Smidt | Free-thinking Democratic League | 672 | 13.46 | | |
| Utrecht I | Valid votes | | 4,993 | 97.50 | 4,798 | 99.15 |
| Utrecht I | Invalid/blank votes | | 128 | 2.50 | 41 | 0.85 |
| Utrecht I | Total votes | | 5,121 | 100 | 4,839 | 100 |
| Utrecht I | Registered voters/turnout | | 6,426 | 79.69 | 6,426 | 75.30 |
| Utrecht II | D. A. P. N. Koolen | Catholic | 1,390 | 39.68 | 1,586 | 45.08 |
| Utrecht II | J. Roëll | Free Liberals | 1,059 | 30.23 | 1,932 | 54.92 |
| Utrecht II | J. Oudegeest | Social Democratic Workers' Party | 903 | 25.78 | | |
| Utrecht II | E. A. Smidt | Free-thinking Democratic League | 151 | 4.31 | | |
| Utrecht II | Valid votes | | 3,503 | 96.85 | 3,518 | 99.13 |
| Utrecht II | Invalid/blank votes | | 114 | 3.15 | 31 | 0.87 |
| Utrecht II | Total votes | | 3,617 | 100 | 3,549 | 100 |
| Utrecht II | Registered voters/turnout | | 4,527 | 79.90 | 4,527 | 78.40 |
| Veendam | J. H. A. Schaper | Social Democratic Workers' Party | 1,927 | 48.97 | 2,110 | 53.26 |
| Veendam | D. Bos | Free-thinking Democratic League | 1,250 | 31.77 | 1,852 | 46.74 |
| Veendam | J. van der Molen Tz. | Anti-Revolutionary Party | 758 | 19.26 | | |
| Veendam | Valid votes | | 3,935 | 97.89 | 3,962 | 98.93 |
| Veendam | Invalid/blank votes | | 85 | 2.11 | 43 | 1.07 |
| Veendam | Total votes | | 4,020 | 100 | 4,005 | 100 |
| Veendam | Registered voters/turnout | | 5,966 | 67.38 | 5,966 | 67.13 |
| Veghel | B. R. F. van Vlijmen | Catholic | Unopposed | | | |
| Venlo | W. H. Nolens | Catholic | Unopposed | | | |
| Waalwijk | W. P. A. Mutsaers | Catholic | Unopposed | | | |
| Weert | V. E. L. de Stuers | Catholic | 2,270 | 68.75 | | |
| Weert | B. J. Hulshof | Catholic | 1,032 | 31.25 | | |
| Weert | Valid votes | | 3,302 | 97.66 | | |
| Weert | Invalid/blank votes | | 79 | 2.34 | | |
| Weert | Total votes | | 3,381 | 100 | | |
| Weert | Registered voters/turnout | | 6,104 | 55.39 | | |
| Weststellingwerf | G. L. van der Zwaag | Social Democratic Workers' Party | 1,222 | 37.30 | 1,984 | 56.22 |
| Weststellingwerf | A. S. Talma | Anti-Revolutionary Party | 1,169 | 35.68 | 1,545 | 43.78 |
| Weststellingwerf | H. Blink | Liberal Union | 885 | 27.01 | | |
| Weststellingwerf | Valid votes | | 3,276 | 98.35 | 3,529 | 98.93 |
| Weststellingwerf | Invalid/blank votes | | 55 | 1.65 | 38 | 1.07 |
| Weststellingwerf | Total votes | | 3,331 | 100 | 3,567 | 100 |
| Weststellingwerf | Registered voters/turnout | | 5,228 | 63.71 | 5,228 | 68.23 |
| Wijk bij Duurstede | H. M. J. van Asch van Wijck | Anti-Revolutionary Party | 3,091 | 69.09 | | |
| Wijk bij Duurstede | J. G. ridder van Rappard | Liberal Union | 1,015 | 22.69 | | |
| Wijk bij Duurstede | J. Oudegeest | Social Democratic Workers' Party | 368 | 8.23 | | |
| Wijk bij Duurstede | Valid votes | | 4,474 | 96.55 | | |
| Wijk bij Duurstede | Invalid/blank votes | | 160 | 3.45 | | |
| Wijk bij Duurstede | Total votes | | 4,634 | 100 | | |
| Wijk bij Duurstede | Registered voters/turnout | | 6,509 | 71.19 | | |
| Winschoten | D. Bos | Free-thinking Democratic League | 1,314 | 33.84 | 2,495 | 54.25 |
| Winschoten | H. H. van Kol | Social Democratic Workers' Party | 1,254 | 32.29 | 2,104 | 45.75 |
| Winschoten | J. C. Wirtz | Anti-Revolutionary Party | 697 | 17.95 | | |
| Winschoten | B. L. Tijdens | Liberal Union | 335 | 8.63 | | |
| Winschoten | E. Brader Bz. | Independent | 283 | 7.29 | | |
| Winschoten | Valid votes | | 3,883 | 98.30 | 4,599 | 99.18 |
| Winschoten | Invalid/blank votes | | 67 | 1.70 | 38 | 0.82 |
| Winschoten | Total votes | | 3,950 | 100 | 4,637 | 100 |
| Winschoten | Registered voters/turnout | | 6,004 | 65.79 | 6,004 | 77.23 |
| Zaandam | K. de Boer | Liberal Union | 2,203 | 44.59 | 3,025 | 62.18 |
| Zaandam | M. Mendels | Social Democratic Workers' Party | 1,428 | 28.90 | 1,840 | 37.82 |
| Zaandam | J. H. Feringa | Anti-Revolutionary Party | 847 | 17.14 | | |
| Zaandam | F. J. A. M. Wierdels | Catholic | 463 | 9.37 | | |
| Zaandam | Valid votes | | 4,941 | 98.19 | 4,865 | 99.16 |
| Zaandam | Invalid/blank votes | | 91 | 1.81 | 41 | 0.84 |
| Zaandam | Total votes | | 5,032 | 100 | 4,906 | 100 |
| Zaandam | Registered voters/turnout | | 7,289 | 69.04 | 7,289 | 67.31 |
| Zevenbergen | E. A. M. van der Kun | Catholic | Unopposed | | | |
| Zierikzee | J. J. Pompe van Meerdervoort | Anti-Revolutionary Party | 2,713 | 52.43 | | |
| Zierikzee | J. A. de Bruijne | Liberal Union | 2,462 | 47.57 | | |
| Zierikzee | Valid votes | | 5,175 | 99.44 | | |
| Zierikzee | Invalid/blank votes | | 29 | 0.56 | | |
| Zierikzee | Total votes | | 5,204 | 100 | | |
| Zierikzee | Registered voters/turnout | | 5,919 | 87.92 | | |
| Zuidhorn | J. C. Wirtz | Anti-Revolutionary Party | 2,157 | 45.32 | 2,403 | 46.09 |
| Zuidhorn | G. Zijlma | Liberal Union | 1,880 | 39.50 | 2,811 | 53.91 |
| Zuidhorn | P. J. Troelstra | Social Democratic Workers' Party | 723 | 15.19 | | |
| Zuidhorn | Valid votes | | 4,760 | 98.33 | 5,214 | 98.81 |
| Zuidhorn | Invalid/blank votes | | 81 | 1.67 | 63 | 1.19 |
| Zuidhorn | Total votes | | 4,841 | 100 | 5,277 | 100 |
| Zuidhorn | Registered voters/turnout | | 6,421 | 75.39 | 6,421 | 82.18 |
| Zutphen | H. Goeman Borgesius | Liberal Union | 2,200 | 44.87 | 2,874 | 53.67 |
| Zutphen | R. P. J. Tutein Nolthenius | Free Liberals | 1,758 | 35.86 | 2,481 | 46.33 |
| Zutphen | M. A. Brants | Anti-Revolutionary Party | 556 | 11.34 | | |
| Zutphen | P. L. Tak | Social Democratic Workers' Party | 389 | 7.93 | | |
| Zutphen | Valid votes | | 4,903 | 97.75 | 5,355 | 99.09 |
| Zutphen | Invalid/blank votes | | 113 | 2.25 | 49 | 0.91 |
| Zutphen | Total votes | | 5,016 | 100 | 5,404 | 100 |
| Zutphen | Registered voters/turnout | | 6,368 | 78.77 | 6,368 | 84.86 |
| Zwolle | A. baron van Dedem | Free Anti Revolutionary Party | 2,343 | 54.95 | | |
| Zwolle | J. Hoven | Free-thinking Democratic League | 1,206 | 28.28 | | |
| Zwolle | M. W. Pijnappel | Free Liberals | 435 | 10.20 | | |
| Zwolle | M. Mendels | Social Democratic Workers' Party | 280 | 6.57 | | |
| Zwolle | Valid votes | | 4,264 | 95.03 | | |
| Zwolle | Invalid/blank votes | | 223 | 4.97 | | |
| Zwolle | Total votes | | 4,487 | 100 | | |
| Zwolle | Registered voters/turnout | | 5,795 | 77.43 | | |
