= Johannes Theodoor de Visser =

Dutch politician (1857–1932)

His Excellency Johannes Theodoor de Visser
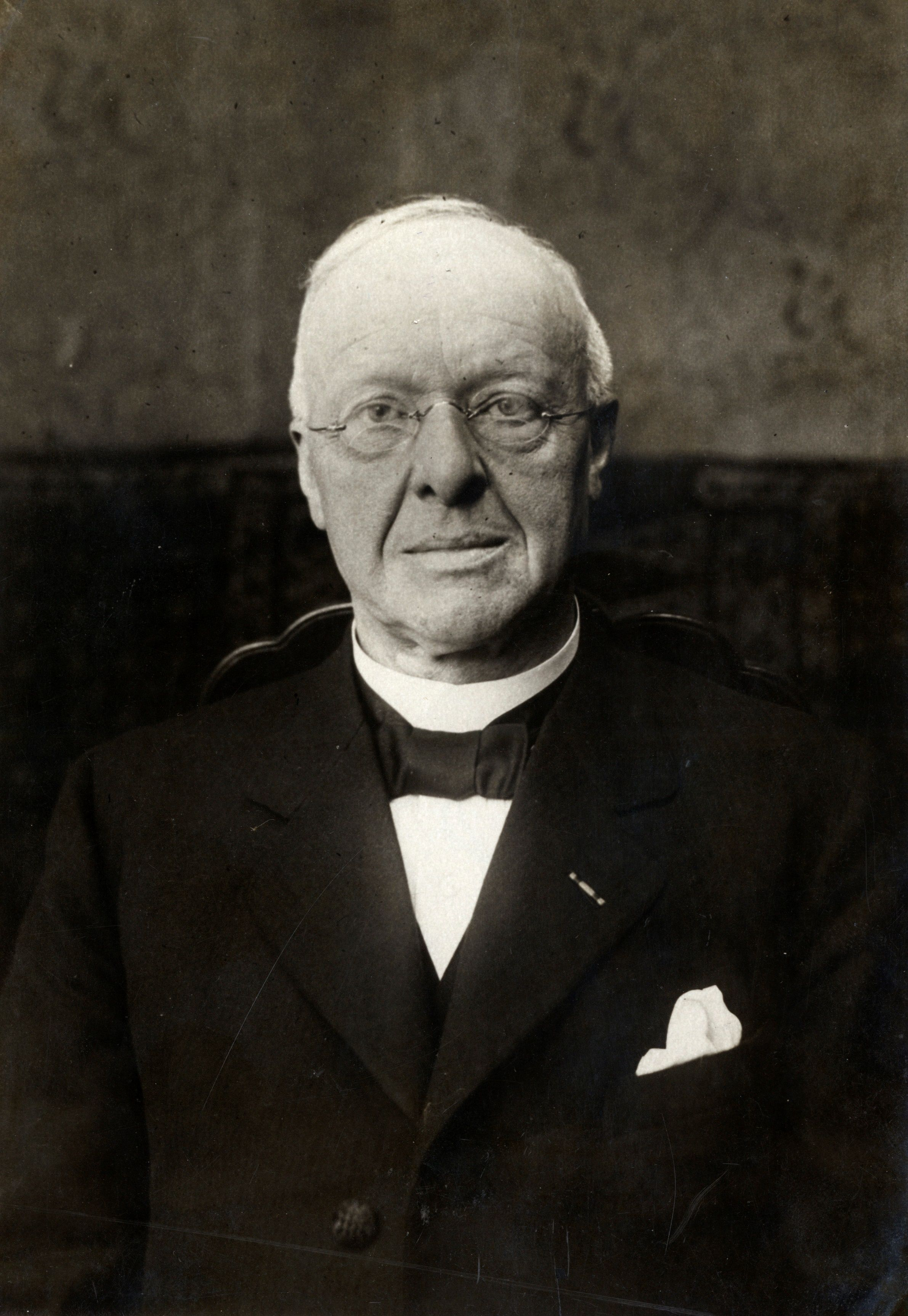
- De Visser in 1918

Minister of Education, Arts and Sciences
- In office 26 September 1918 – 4 August 1925
- Prime Minister: Charles Ruijs de Beerenbrouck
- Succeeded by: Victor Rutgers

Leader of the CHU in the House of Representatives
- In office 16 September 1925 – 8 July 1929

Member of the House of Representatives
- In office 15 September 1925 – 17 September 1929
- In office 25 July 1922 – 17 September 1922
- In office 24 June 1914 – 17 September 1918
- Preceded by: Otto Jacob Eifelanus van Wassenaer van Catwijck
- Constituency: Katwijk
- In office 13 November 1906 – 16 September 1913
- In office 21 September 1897 – 19 september 1905

Member of the Provincial Council of South Holland
- In office 1916–1918

Personal details
- Born: Johannes Theodoor de Visser; 9 February 1857 Utrecht, Netherlands
- Died: 14 April 1932 (age 94) The Hague, Netherlands
- Party: Christian Historical Union (since 1908)
- Other political affiliations: Christian Historical Party (1903–1908) Christian Historical Voters' League (1897–1903)
- Spouse: Gezina Ida van der Garde (m. 1882)
- Relatives: Louis de Visser (second cousin)
- Occupation: Politician; minister

Johannes Theodoor (or Theodorus) de Visser (9 February 1857 – 14 April 1932) was a Dutch preacher and politician for the Christian Historical Union (CHU). He was the Netherlands' first Minister of Education.

== Early life and education ==
De Visser was born in Utrecht on 9 February 1857. After attending grammar school, he went on to study theology in his hometown in 1874, at the age of seventeen. He received his doctorate from Josué Jean Philippe Valeton cum laude with a dissertation on De Daemonologie van het Oude Testament ('The Demonology of the Old Testament') on 27 May 1880. A year before, he had already taken his candidate exam in law.

== Career ==
De Visser was a Reformed minister in congregations in Leusden, Almelo, Amsterdam, and Rotterdam. In 1897 he came to the House of Representatives for the small Christian Historical Voters' League and remained a member of it (with interruptions) until 1918. During this period, he worked closely with the Free Anti Revolutionary Party led by Alexander de Savornin Lohman. The Christian Historical Voters' League fused with this party in 1903 to form the Christian Historical Party, and in 1908 this party again fused with the Frisian League to form the Christian Historical Union.

=== Minister of Education, Arts and Sciences ===
On 26 September 1918, De Visser was appointed Minister of Education, Arts and Sciences in the first Ruijs de Beerenbrouck cabinet; he was the first education minister in the twentieth century. (Note: In the nineteenth century there was a Minister of Public Education, National Industry and Colonies from 19 March 1818 to 30 March 1824; the official of this ministry was Anton Reinhard Falck.)

In 1919, De Visser brought about the Industrial Education Act, which concerned itself with apprenticeships in vocational education. With his Lower Education Act – which was approved nearly unanimously in 1920, he ended the school struggle based on the Pacification of 1917. In addition to providing equal public funding for special schools, the act provided room for religious education within regular school hours. The act also reduced class sizes, introduced a seventh grade and improved teachers' training. Teachers' salaries would henceforth be paid by the national government, while costs related to school buildings were paid by local government. Moreover, extended lower education was given legal recognition as a separate school type. De Visser was praised for his defence of the bill in the House of Representatives, and its passing was met with applause in the plenary chamber. A 1921 amendment of the Compulsory Education Act extended compulsory education to the seventh year of lower education, or the age of 13.

However, De Visser subsequently lost most of the trust he had enjoyed in the House of Representatives. From 1920 onward, he reversed some of the improvements he had implemented as part of a general budget reduction. In 1924, he temporarily suspended compulsory education in the seventh grade, increased class sizes and introduced a system of unpaid teaching assistants. Furthermore, the Coalition parties were unhappy about his reluctance to extend the equal funding of special schools beyond lower education.

De Visser's attempt at secondary education reform also proved less successful. In 1921, he introduced a bill that would have merged middle and preparatory higher education into a single school type, and given schools more autonomy in curriculum and thereby more space for educational experiments. He later changed the bill so that middle and preparatory higher education would remain separate due to opposition to their merger in the House of Representatives, but this did not save the bill, and De Visser did not succeed in getting it approved by the House before leaving office. With respect to higher education, a 1920 amendment of the Higher Education Act made a written thesis a requirement for obtaining a doctorate.

Although he had an aversion to the use of Bible texts in Parliament, he conducted a theologically oriented debate about subsidies for the Olympic Games in 1925. He failed to gather enough support in the House of Representatives to reserve a million guilders for the 1928 Summer Olympics.

=== Later political career ===
After his term of office, he returned to Parliament as faction leader of the CHU. He fell out with his fellow party members in 1926 after he – unsuccessfully – tried to form a cabinet outside his party and seek a compromise for the Dutch legation to the Holy See. On 31 August 1931, De Visser was appointed the honorary title of Minister of State. A bust of De Visser, made by Han Wezelaar, was unveiled in 1937 on the Bezuidenhoutseweg near de Koekamp in The Hague. It is now located in the hall of the Ministry of Education, Culture and Science.

== Personal life ==
De Visser was the son of Justus de Visser, a merchant, and Simonia Gerarda de Ruijter, who died at a young age. He was married on 5 July 1882 to Gezina Ida van der Garde, with whom he had three sons and one daughter.
