= Katwijk (electoral district) =

Katwijk was an electoral district of the House of Representatives in the Netherlands from 1888 to 1918.

== Profile ==
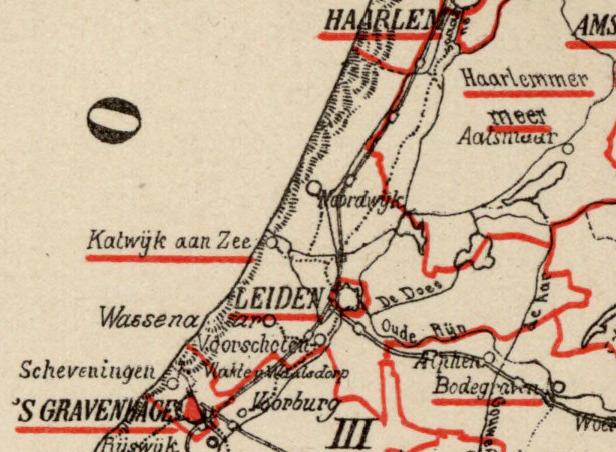
The district of Katwijk in 1888

The electoral district of Katwijk was created in 1888, mostly out of parts of the Leiden district, which was reduced to a single-seat district encompassing only the municipality of Leiden. Katwijk spanned much of the northern part of the province of South Holland, and was named after the coastal town of Katwijk aan Zee. Other municipalities it encompassed were Koudekerk aan den Rijn, Leiderdorp, Noordwijk, Noordwijkerhout, Oegstgeest, Oudshoorn, Rijnsaterwoude, Rijnsburg, Sassenheim, Valkenburg, Veur, Voorhout, Voorschoten, Warmond, Wassenaar, Woubrugge and Zoeterwoude. It was a predominantly agricultural district.

The district's population increased from 46,041 in 1888 to 57,437 in 1909. The majority of the population was Protestant; the share of Dutch Reformed inhabitants dropped slightly from 45.5% to 41.7% in the same period, while the share of Gereformeerde inhabitants grew from 13.3% to 16.7%. The district was home to a considerable Catholic minority, which remained stable at around 39% of the population. The share of "Others" varied from 1.6% to 3.1%.

The district of Katwijk was abolished upon the introduction of party-list proportional representation in 1918.

== Members ==
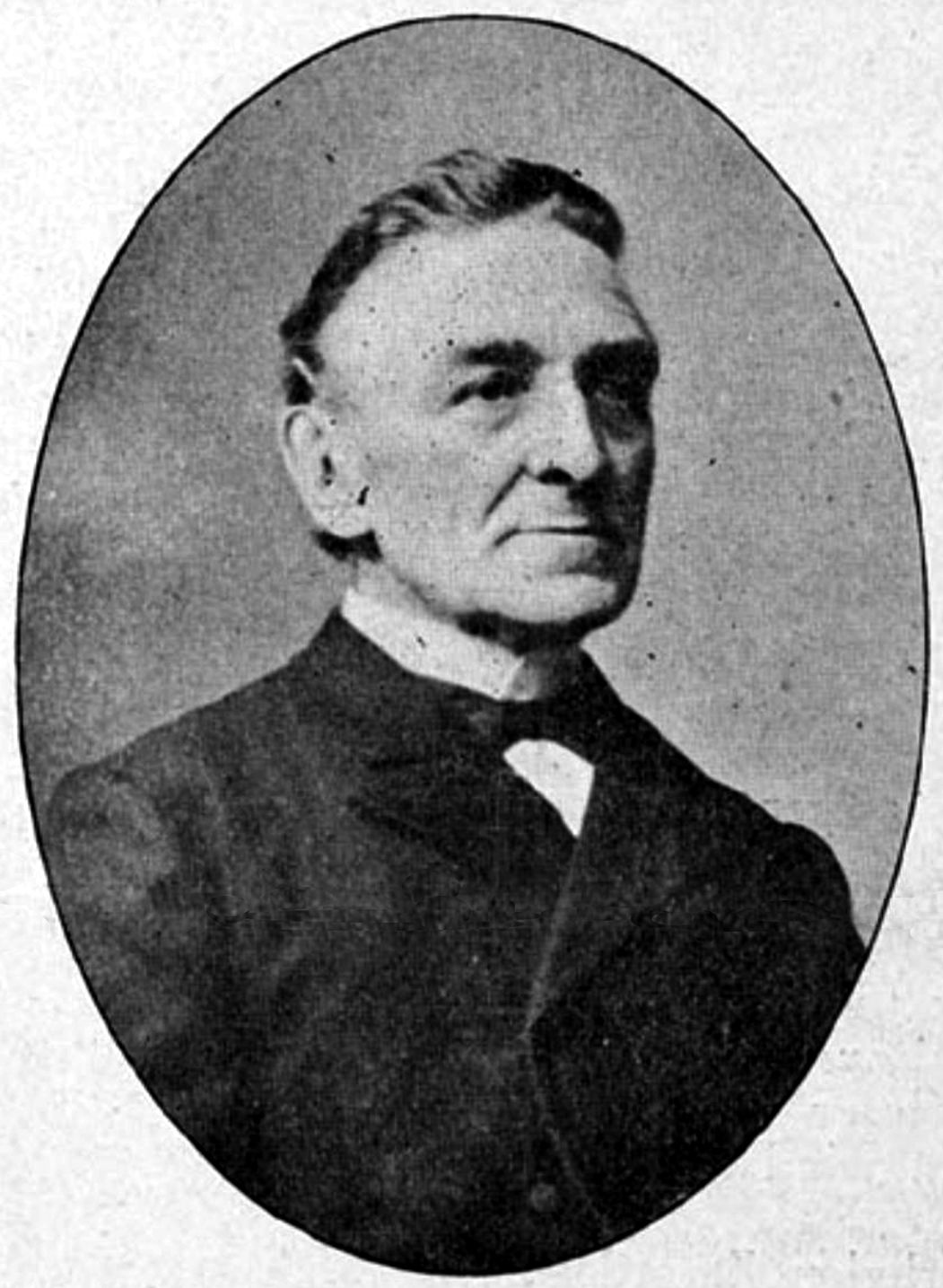
Donner, 1903

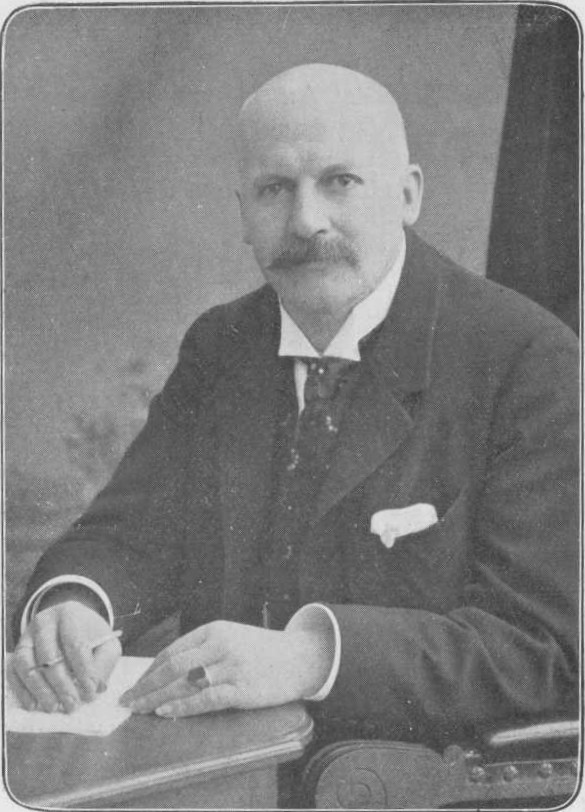
Van Wassenaer van Catwijck, c. 1913

Katwijk was a safe seat for the parliamentary right, though it was frequently contested between different parties on the right. The inaugural election was won by Johannes Hendricus Donner, who was an incumbent Anti-Revolutionary member of parliament for Leiden. In 1894 he was defeated by the National Conservative candidate Otto Jan Herbert van Limburg Stirum, but the latter was also elected in the district of Schiedam and opted to represent that district. The subsequent by-election in Katwijk was won by Donner. In 1901, Donner was succeeded by Otto Jacob Eifelanus van Wassenaer van Catwijck who, after some party mergers, represented the Christian Historical Union (CHU). He resigned upon his election to the Senate in 1914, and was succeeded by Johannes Theodoor de Visser, later education minister, who represented the district until its abolition in 1918.

Election	Member	Party	Ref.
1888	Johannes Hendricus Donner	AR	
1891	Johannes Hendricus Donner	AR	
1894	Otto Jan Herbert van Limburg Stirum	NC	
1894	Johannes Hendricus Donner	AR	
1897	Johannes Hendricus Donner	AR	
1901	Otto Jacob Eifelanus van Wassenaer van Catwijck	VA	
1905	Otto Jacob Eifelanus van Wassenaer van Catwijck	CHP	
1909	Otto Jacob Eifelanus van Wassenaer van Catwijck	CHU	
1913	Otto Jacob Eifelanus van Wassenaer van Catwijck	CHU	
1914	Johannes Theodoor de Visser	CHU	
1917	Johannes Theodoor de Visser	CHU	

== Election results ==
=== Elections in the 1880s ===
1888 general election: Katwijk
Candidate	Party	First round		Second round	
Candidate	Party	Votes	%	Votes	%
Johannes Hendricus Donner	AR	1,392	39.38	1,715	53.96
J. Maschek	Ka	1,377	38.95	1,463	46.04
H.A.C. de la Bassecour Caan	Lib	751	21.24		
Others		15	0.42		
Total		3,535	100.00	3,178	100.00
Valid votes		3,535	99.72	3,178	98.76
Invalid/blank votes		10	0.28	40	1.24
Total votes		3,545	100.00	3,218	100.00
Registered voters/turnout		3,861	91.82	3,861	83.35
Anti-Revolutionary gain					
Source: Electoral Council, Huygens Institute

=== Elections in the 1890s ===
1891 general election: Katwijk
Candidate	Party	First round		Second round	
Candidate	Party	Votes	%	Votes	%
Johannes Hendricus Donner	AR	1,256	36.97	1,942	57.63
A. op de Laak	Ka	1,243	36.59	1,428	42.37
Otto Jan Herbert van Limburg Stirum	Independent	450	13.25		
C.A. Zelvelder	Lib	436	12.83		
Others		12	0.35		
Total		3,397	100.00	3,370	100.00
Valid votes		3,397	99.36	3,370	98.88
Invalid/blank votes		22	0.64	38	1.12
Total votes		3,419	100.00	3,408	100.00
Registered voters/turnout		4,138	82.62	4,138	82.36
Anti-Revolutionary hold					
Source: Electoral Council, Huygens Institute

1894 general election: Katwijk
Candidate	Party	Votes	%
Otto Jan Herbert van Limburg Stirum	NC	1,857	58.43
Johannes Hendricus Donner	AR	1,311	41.25
Others		10	0.31
Total		3,178	100.00
Valid votes		3,178	99.56
Invalid/blank votes		14	0.44
Total votes		3,192	100.00
Registered voters/turnout		4,060	78.62
National Conservative gain			
Source: Electoral Council, Huygens Institute

1894 Katwijk by-election
Candidate	Party	First round		Second round	
Candidate	Party	Votes	%	Votes	%
Frederic Joseph Maria Anton Reekers	Ka	1,518	44.81	1,694	47.68
Johannes Hendricus Donner	AR	1,160	34.24	1,859	52.32
Otto Jacob Eifelanus van Wassenaer van Catwijck	AR	448	13.22		
A.D. van Assendelft de Coningh	Lib	251	7.41		
Others		11	0.32		
Total		3,388	100.00	3,553	100.00
Valid votes		3,388	99.82	3,553	98.89
Invalid/blank votes		6	0.18	40	1.11
Total votes		3,394	100.00	3,593	100.00
Registered voters/turnout		4,160	81.59	4,160	86.37
Anti-Revolutionary gain					
Source: Electoral Council, Huygens Institute

1897 general election: Katwijk
Candidate	Party	First round		Second round	
Candidate	Party	Votes	%	Votes	%
Joseph Willem Jan Carel Marie van Nispen tot Sevenaer	Ka	2,297	43.82	2,359	46.42
Johannes Hendricus Donner	AR	2,012	38.38	2,723	53.58
M. van den Brandeler	CHK	933	17.80		
Total		5,242	100.00	5,082	100.00
Valid votes		5,242	99.30	5,082	98.87
Invalid/blank votes		37	0.70	58	1.13
Total votes		5,279	100.00	5,140	100.00
Registered voters/turnout		5,728	92.16	5,728	89.73
Anti-Revolutionary hold					
Source: Electoral Council, Huygens Institute

=== Elections in the 1900s ===
1901 general election: Katwijk
Candidate	Party	First round		Second round	
Candidate	Party	Votes	%	Votes	%
Piet Aalberse Sr.	Ka	2,347	42.60	2,574	45.74
Otto Jacob Eifelanus van Wassenaer van Catwijck	VA	1,439	26.12	3,053	54.26
Schelto van Heemstra	AR	1,401	25.43		
H.H. van Waveren	Lib	323	5.86		
Total		5,510	100.00	5,627	100.00
Valid votes		5,510	96.58	5,627	99.63
Invalid/blank votes		195	3.42	21	0.37
Total votes		5,705	100.00	5,648	100.00
Registered voters/turnout		6,568	86.86	6,568	85.99
Free Antirevolutionary gain					
Source: Electoral Council, Huygens Institute

1905 general election: Katwijk
Candidate	Party	Votes	%
Otto Jacob Eifelanus van Wassenaer van Catwijck	CHP	5,569	83.47
Hendrik Goeman Borgesius	Lib	1,103	16.53
Total		6,672	100.00
Valid votes		6,672	98.65
Invalid/blank votes		91	1.35
Total votes		6,763	100.00
Registered voters/turnout		8,117	83.32
Christian Historical hold			
Source: Electoral Council, Huygens Institute

1909 general election: Katwijk
Candidate	Party	Votes	%
Otto Jacob Eifelanus van Wassenaer van Catwijck	CHU	5,875	87.41
C.A. Elias	Lib	846	12.59
Total		6,721	100.00
Valid votes		6,721	98.81
Invalid/blank votes		81	1.19
Total votes		6,802	100.00
Registered voters/turnout		8,932	76.15
Christian Historical hold			
Source: Electoral Council, Huygens Institute

=== Elections in the 1910s ===
1913 general election: Katwijk
Candidate	Party	Votes	%
Otto Jacob Eifelanus van Wassenaer van Catwijck	CHU	6,663	81.42
Johannes Kielstra	VL	1,158	14.15
S.R. Rodrigues de Miranda	SDAP	227	2.77
P.J. Muller	NBPK	135	1.65
Total		8,183	100.00
Valid votes		8,183	97.81
Invalid/blank votes		183	2.19
Total votes		8,366	100.00
Registered voters/turnout		10,379	80.61
Christian Historical hold			
Source: Electoral Council, Huygens Institute

1914 Katwijk by-election
Candidate	Party	Votes	%
Johannes Theodoor de Visser	CHU	6,176	83.75
H.W.C.J. de Jong	VL	956	12.96
S.R. Rodrigues de Miranda	SDAP	242	3.28
Total		7,374	100.00
Valid votes		7,374	98.49
Invalid/blank votes		113	1.51
Total votes		7,487	100.00
Registered voters/turnout		10,505	71.27
Christian Historical hold			
Source: Electoral Council, Huygens Institute

1917 general election: Katwijk
Candidate	Party	Votes	%
Johannes Theodoor de Visser	CHU	4,290	85.94
J.H. Ekering	AG	702	14.06
Total		4,992	100.00
Valid votes		4,992	97.56
Invalid/blank votes		125	2.44
Total votes		5,117	100.00
Registered voters/turnout		11,414	44.83
Christian Historical hold			
Source: Electoral Council, Huygens Institute
