= Frisian League =

Dutch conservative Reformed political party

The League of Electoral Associations on a Christian Historical Foundation in the province of Friesland (Dutch: Bond van Kiesvereenigingen op Christelijk-Historischen grondslag in de provincie Friesland), informally called the Frisian League (Dutch: Friesche Bond) was a conservative Reformed political party in the Netherlands.

== Party history ==
The Frisian League was founded on 24 March 1898 by the reformed minister Philippus Jacobus Hoedemaker. It was founded as one of several parties in the 1890s that revolved around the leadership and ideology of Abraham Kuyper, the leader of the Protestant Anti-Revolutionary Party. Kuyper had initiated a new political course for Protestantism in the Netherlands, which included cooperation with the Catholics, in the Coalition, strategical support for extension of suffrage, a rejection of theocracy in favour of a specific conception of state neutrality, sphere sovereignty and a strong party organization and party discipline. The party also rejected the split of the Reformed Churches in the Netherlands from the Dutch Reformed Church.

The party won one seat (Harlingen) in the 1901 general election, which was taken by the minister Jan Schokking. It held its one seat in the 1905 general election. In 1908, the party merged with the Christian Historical Party to found the Christian Historical Union.

== Name ==
The rather complicated name of the party "League of electoral associations on Christian Historical foundation in the province of Friesland" was chosen to convey several meanings: the party was not a centralized party with party discipline, instead it was a league of local electoral associations; the term "Christian Historical" was used before 1898 to denote supporters of the main Protestant party, the Anti-Revolutionary Party, emphasizing the Protestant nature of the history of the Netherlands; and finally the only representatives of the party came from Friesland, although it also had branches in South Holland.

== Ideology and issues ==
The Frisian League was a conservative Protestant party. It saw government as a God-given institution, which should act according to biblical norms. Society should furthermore follow its historical course. Power should not be based on the opinion of the majority but on authority. The most important issue for the party was the increasing separation of church and state and the acceptance of Catholicism. The party advocated a Protestant theocracy and was strongly anti-papist. Furthermore, the party opposed universal suffrage.

== Representation ==
This table shows the Frisian League's results elections to the House of Representatives and Senate, as well as the party's parliamentary leader.

| Year | HoR | S | Parliamentary leader | Cabinet |
|---|---|---|---|---|
| 1901 | 1 | 0 | Jan Schokking | supports the Kuyper cabinet |
| 1902 | 1 | 0 | Jan Schokking | supports the Kuyper cabinet |
| 1903 | 1 | 0 | Jan Schokking | supports the Kuyper cabinet |
| 1904 | 1 | 0 | Jan Schokking | supports the Kuyper cabinet |
| 1905 | 1 | 0 | Jan Schokking | opposition |
| 1906 | 1 | 0 | Jan Schokking | opposition |
| 1907 | 1 | 0 | Jan Schokking | opposition |

== Electorate ==
The electorate of the Frisian League mainly consisted of adherents of the Dutch Reformed Church from the upper class. Its support was heavily regionalized in Friesland.
