= 1905 Dutch general election =

- 16 June 1905 (first round); 28 June 1905 (second round)
- All 100 seats in the House of Representatives; 51 seats needed for a majority
- Turnout: 82.98% (first round); 87.99% (second round)
Party	Leader	Seats	+/–
LU	Hendrik Goeman Borgesius	25	+4
AB	Maximilien Kolkman	25	0
VDB	Hendrik Lodewijk Drucker	10	+4
VL	Meinard Tydeman	10	+2
ARP	Abraham Kuyper	15	−9
SDAP	Pieter Jelles Troelstra	7	0
CHP	Alexander de Savornin Lohman	7	−1
FB	Jan Schokking	1	0
This lists parties that won seats. See the complete results below.
Cabinet before	Cabinet after
Kuyper cabinet Coalition	De Meester cabinet Liberal

General elections were held in the Netherlands on 16 June 1905, with a second round in some constituencies on 28 June. The General League of Roman Catholic Electoral Associations and the Liberal Union emerged as the largest party, winning each 25 of the 100 seats in the House of Representatives.

== Electoral system ==
The 100 seats in the House of Representatives were elected in single-member constituencies using the two-round system.

== Results ==
Party	First round			Second round			Total seats
Party	Votes	%	Seats	Votes	%	Seats	Total seats
Anti-Revolutionary Party	138,357	23.71	13	70,668	26.15	2	15
Liberal Union	114,692	19.66	8	70,556	26.11	17	25
General League	87,409	14.98	23	16,494	6.10	2	25
Social Democratic Workers' Party	65,558	11.23	0	35,458	13.12	7	7
Christian Historical Party	53,199	9.12	7	16,837	6.23	0	7
Free-thinking Democratic League	52,190	8.94	5	21,050	7.79	5	10
Free Liberals	45,887	7.86	3	27,843	10.30	7	10
Frisian League	9,571	1.64	1	3,179	1.18	0	1
Christian Democratic Party	4,140	0.71	0				0
National Historical Party	2,572	0.44	0	2,637	0.98	0	0
Independent	9,942	1.70	0	5,503	2.04	0	0
Total	583,517	100.00	60	270,225	100.00	40	100
Valid votes	583,517	98.65		270,225	99.30		
Invalid/blank votes	7,974	1.35		1,899	0.70		
Total votes	591,491	100.00		272,124	100.00		
Registered voters/turnout	712,849	82.98		309,258	87.99		
Source: Kiesraad, Huygens

Several candidates ran in multiple districts. When they won in more than one seat they picked which seat to take. As a result, several by-elections took place shortly after the general election.

=== By district ===
Results by district
District	Candidate	Party	First round		Second round	
District	Candidate	Party	Votes	%	Votes	%
Alkmaar	J. H. Blum	Anti-Revolutionary Party	3,420	39.93	3,509	40.41
Alkmaar	P. van Foreest	Free Liberals	3,275	38.24	5,174	59.59
Alkmaar	F. C. J. Netscher	Free-thinking Democratic League	1,509	17.62		
Alkmaar	M. Mendels	Social Democratic Workers' Party	360	4.20		
Alkmaar	Valid votes		8,564	99.34	8,683	99.72
Alkmaar	Invalid/blank votes		57	0.66	24	0.28
Alkmaar	Total votes		8,621	100	8,707	100
Alkmaar	Registered voters/turnout		9,543	90.34	9,543	91.24
Almelo	P. J. M. Aalberse	General League	5,217	66.52		
Almelo	I. A. Levy	Independent	1,907	24.31		
Almelo	J. F. Tijhof	Social Democratic Workers' Party	719	9.17		
Almelo	Valid votes		7,843	96.93		
Almelo	Invalid/blank votes		248	3.07		
Almelo	Total votes		8,091	100		
Almelo	Registered voters/turnout		9,324	86.78		
Amersfoort	H. W. van Asch van Wijck	Anti-Revolutionary Party	4,485	52.67		
Amersfoort	W. H. de Beaufort	Free Liberals	3,592	42.18		
Amersfoort	F. van der Goes	Social Democratic Workers' Party	330	3.88		
Amersfoort	A. P. Staalman	Christian Democratic Party	109	1.28		
Amersfoort	Valid votes		8,516	99.39		
Amersfoort	Invalid/blank votes		52	0.61		
Amersfoort	Total votes		8,568	100		
Amersfoort	Registered voters/turnout		9,416	90.99		
Amsterdam I	H. F. R. Hubrecht	Liberal Union	2,085	56.87		
Amsterdam I	D. Schut	Anti-Revolutionary Party	1,256	34.26		
Amsterdam I	S. J. Pothuis	Social Democratic Workers' Party	325	8.87		
Amsterdam I	Valid votes		3,666	97.92		
Amsterdam I	Invalid/blank votes		78	2.08		
Amsterdam I	Total votes		3,744	100		
Amsterdam I	Registered voters/turnout		4,996	74.94		
Amsterdam II	J. T. de Visser	Christian Historical Party	1,177	46.93	1,346	46.25
Amsterdam II	C. Lely	Liberal Union	722	28.79	1,564	53.75
Amsterdam II	M. Mendels	Social Democratic Workers' Party	609	24.28		
Amsterdam II	Valid votes		2,508	97.06	2,910	99.11
Amsterdam II	Invalid/blank votes		76	2.94	26	0.89
Amsterdam II	Total votes		2,584	100	2,936	100
Amsterdam II	Registered voters/turnout		3,481	74.23	3,481	84.34
Amsterdam III	P. J. Troelstra	Social Democratic Workers' Party	3,837	48.28	4,564	56.85
Amsterdam III	K. Eland	Liberal Union	2,056	25.87	3,464	43.15
Amsterdam III	A. S. Talma	Anti-Revolutionary Party	1,926	24.23		
Amsterdam III	A. P. Staalman	Christian Democratic Party	129	1.62		
Amsterdam III	Valid votes		7,948	98.03	8,028	98.93
Amsterdam III	Invalid/blank votes		160	1.97	87	1.07
Amsterdam III	Total votes		8,108	100	8,115	100
Amsterdam III	Registered voters/turnout		10,163	79.78	10,163	79.85
Amsterdam IV	J. W. Ijzerman	Liberal Union	1,680	59.45		
Amsterdam IV	J. Loopuit	Social Democratic Workers' Party	683	24.17		
Amsterdam IV	H. W. Hovy	Independent	463	16.38		
Amsterdam IV	Valid votes		2,826	97.18		
Amsterdam IV	Invalid/blank votes		82	2.82		
Amsterdam IV	Total votes		2,908	100		
Amsterdam IV	Registered voters/turnout		3,939	73.83		
Amsterdam V	T. M. Ketelaar	Free-thinking Democratic League	3,993	50.14		
Amsterdam V	G. A. P. M. van der Aa	General League	2,495	31.33		
Amsterdam V	A. H. Gerhard	Social Democratic Workers' Party	1,476	18.53		
Amsterdam V	Valid votes		7,964	98.31		
Amsterdam V	Invalid/blank votes		137	1.69		
Amsterdam V	Total votes		8,101	100		
Amsterdam V	Registered voters/turnout		10,594	76.47		
Amsterdam VI	W. H. de Beaufort	Free Liberals	2,370	53.97		
Amsterdam VI	C. Roëll	Christian Historical Party	1,840	41.90		
Amsterdam VI	J. A. Fortuyn	Social Democratic Workers' Party	181	4.12		
Amsterdam VI	Valid votes		4,391	98.67		
Amsterdam VI	Invalid/blank votes		59	1.33		
Amsterdam VI	Total votes		4,450	100		
Amsterdam VI	Registered voters/turnout		5,505	80.84		
Amsterdam VII	Th. Heemskerk	Anti-Revolutionary Party	1,771	48.18	1,934	48.40
Amsterdam VII	C. F. J. Blooker	Free Liberals	1,667	45.35	2,062	51.60
Amsterdam VII	T. Westra	Social Democratic Workers' Party	209	5.69		
Amsterdam VII	W. H. Lieftinck	Christian Democratic Party	29	0.79		
Amsterdam VII	Valid votes		3,676	98.55	3,996	99.25
Amsterdam VII	Invalid/blank votes		54	1.45	30	0.75
Amsterdam VII	Total votes		3,730	100	4,026	100
Amsterdam VII	Registered voters/turnout		4,419	84.41	4,419	91.11
Amsterdam VIII	S. de Vries Cz.	Independent	1,391	46.46	1,540	45.32
Amsterdam VIII	P. Nolting	Free-thinking Democratic League	1,336	44.62	1,858	54.68
Amsterdam VIII	P. L. Tak	Social Democratic Workers' Party	214	7.15		
Amsterdam VIII	H. van Munster	Christian Democratic Party	53	1.77		
Amsterdam VIII	Valid votes		2,994	98.29	3,398	99.15
Amsterdam VIII	Invalid/blank votes		52	1.71	29	0.85
Amsterdam VIII	Total votes		3,046	100	3,427	100
Amsterdam VIII	Registered voters/turnout		3,854	79.03	3,854	88.92
Amsterdam IX	C. T. van Deventer	Free-thinking Democratic League	3,678	38.48	6,465	64.84
Amsterdam IX	H. Bijleveld	Anti-Revolutionary Party	3,456	36.15	3,506	35.16
Amsterdam IX	J. G. van Kuykhof	Social Democratic Workers' Party	2,318	24.25		
Amsterdam IX	T. B. V. Dill	Christian Democratic Party	107	1.12		
Amsterdam IX	Valid votes		9,559	98.23	9,971	99.32
Amsterdam IX	Invalid/blank votes		172	1.77	68	0.68
Amsterdam IX	Total votes		9,731	100	10,039	100
Amsterdam IX	Registered voters/turnout		12,748	76.33	12,748	78.75
Apeldoorn	W. K. F. P. graaf van Bylandt	Christian Historical Party	4,147	55.13		
Apeldoorn	R. A. P. Sandberg tot Essenburg	Free Liberals	2,994	39.80		
Apeldoorn	P. J. Troelstra	Social Democratic Workers' Party	381	5.07		
Apeldoorn	Valid votes		7,522	98.83		
Apeldoorn	Invalid/blank votes		89	1.17		
Apeldoorn	Total votes		7,611	100		
Apeldoorn	Registered voters/turnout		8,869	85.82		
Appingedam	J. H. A. Schaper	Social Democratic Workers' Party	2,838	39.58	4,087	59.19
Appingedam	G. J. Sybrandy	Anti-Revolutionary Party	2,560	35.70	2,818	40.81
Appingedam	J. H. W. Q. ter Spill	Liberal Union	1,773	24.72		
Appingedam	Valid votes		7,171	99.56	6,905	99.25
Appingedam	Invalid/blank votes		32	0.44	52	0.75
Appingedam	Total votes		7,203	100	6,957	100
Appingedam	Registered voters/turnout		8,305	86.73	8,305	83.77
Arnhem	P. Rink	Liberal Union	2,729	45.56	3,396	55.34
Arnhem	C. van der Voort van Zijp	Anti-Revolutionary Party	2,649	44.22	2,741	44.66
Arnhem	W. P. G. Helsdingen	Social Democratic Workers' Party	612	10.22		
Arnhem	Valid votes		5,990	99.04	6,137	99.43
Arnhem	Invalid/blank votes		58	0.96	35	0.57
Arnhem	Total votes		6,048	100	6,172	100
Arnhem	Registered voters/turnout		6,754	89.55	6,754	91.38
Assen	M. W. F. Treub	Free-thinking Democratic League	2,869	68.24		
Assen	H. Bos Kz.	Anti-Revolutionary Party	1,034	24.60		
Assen	A. van der Heide	Social Democratic Workers' Party	301	7.16		
Assen	Valid votes		4,204	98.69		
Assen	Invalid/blank votes		56	1.31		
Assen	Total votes		4,260	100		
Assen	Registered voters/turnout		6,898	61.76		
Bergen op Zoom	L. D. J. L. de Ram	General League	3,116	77.73		
Bergen op Zoom	H. Goeman Borgesius	Liberal Union	453	11.30		
Bergen op Zoom	J. Brinkhuis	General League	440	10.98		
Bergen op Zoom	Valid votes		4,009	98.02		
Bergen op Zoom	Invalid/blank votes		81	1.98		
Bergen op Zoom	Total votes		4,090	100		
Bergen op Zoom	Registered voters/turnout		7,219	56.66		
Beverwijk	W. C. J. Passtoors	General League	5,374	53.41		
Beverwijk	J. Limburg	Free-thinking Democratic League	3,889	38.65		
Beverwijk	J. Gerritz	Social Democratic Workers' Party	490	4.87		
Beverwijk	O. Kamerlingh Onnes	Free Liberals	191	1.90		
Beverwijk	A. P. Staalman	Christian Democratic Party	118	1.17		
Beverwijk	Valid votes		10,062	98.69		
Beverwijk	Invalid/blank votes		134	1.31		
Beverwijk	Total votes		10,196	100		
Beverwijk	Registered voters/turnout		11,021	92.51		
Bodegraven	J. W. H. M. van Idsinga	Christian Historical Party	4,838	61.03		
Bodegraven	K. Reyne	Liberal Union	2,759	34.81		
Bodegraven	P. J. Troelstra	Social Democratic Workers' Party	330	4.16		
Bodegraven	Valid votes		7,927	99.24		
Bodegraven	Invalid/blank votes		61	0.76		
Bodegraven	Total votes		7,988	100		
Bodegraven	Registered voters/turnout		8,751	91.28		
Breda	L. P. M. H. baron van Michiels van Verduynen	General League	3,616	70.43		
Breda	J. A. H. van den Brink	Social Democratic Workers' Party	923	17.98		
Breda	G. C. A. Fabius	Free-thinking Democratic League	595	11.59		
Breda	Valid votes		5,134	98.73		
Breda	Invalid/blank votes		66	1.27		
Breda	Total votes		5,200	100		
Breda	Registered voters/turnout		6,755	76.98		
Breukelen	J. H. de Waal Malefijt	Anti-Revolutionary Party	4,248	69.95		
Breukelen	H. P. Kapteyn	Liberal Union	1,825	30.05		
Breukelen	Valid votes		6,073	98.84		
Breukelen	Invalid/blank votes		71	1.16		
Breukelen	Total votes		6,144	100		
Breukelen	Registered voters/turnout		7,541	81.47		
Brielle	A. Roodhuyzen	Liberal Union	3,477	52.43		
Brielle	Æ. baron van Mackay Thzn.	Christian Historical Party	2,678	40.38		
Brielle	P. J. Troelstra	Social Democratic Workers' Party	477	7.19		
Brielle	Valid votes		6,632	99.04		
Brielle	Invalid/blank votes		64	0.96		
Brielle	Total votes		6,696	100		
Brielle	Registered voters/turnout		7,467	89.67		
Delft	H. A. van de Velde	Anti-Revolutionary Party	3,386	56.46		
Delft	A. R. Zimmerman	Free Liberals	2,029	33.83		
Delft	J. A. Bergmeyer	Social Democratic Workers' Party	582	9.70		
Delft	Valid votes		5,997	99.35		
Delft	Invalid/blank votes		39	0.65		
Delft	Total votes		6,036	100		
Delft	Registered voters/turnout		6,669	90.51		
Den Bosch	A. F. O. van Sasse van Ysselt	General League	2,251	83.62		
Den Bosch	S. van Houten	Free Liberals	441	16.38		
Den Bosch	Valid votes		2,692	98.36		
Den Bosch	Invalid/blank votes		45	1.64		
Den Bosch	Total votes		2,737	100		
Den Bosch	Registered voters/turnout		5,341	51.25		
Den Haag I	J. Krap	Anti-Revolutionary Party	2,736	40.92	3,131	43.29
Den Haag I	J. Limburg	Free-thinking Democratic League	2,267	33.90	4,102	56.71
Den Haag I	J. A. Bergmeyer	Social Democratic Workers' Party	1,370	20.49		
Den Haag I	J. H. Valckenier Kips	Free Liberals	291	4.35		
Den Haag I	T. B. V. Dill	Christian Democratic Party	23	0.34		
Den Haag I	Valid votes		6,687	97.99	7,233	99.31
Den Haag I	Invalid/blank votes		137	2.01	50	0.69
Den Haag I	Total votes		6,824	100	7,283	100
Den Haag I	Registered voters/turnout		8,853	77.08	8,853	82.27
Den Haag II	W. Dolk	Liberal Union	3,362	44.74	4,529	56.96
Den Haag II	J. T. de Visser	Christian Historical Party	3,244	43.17	3,422	43.04
Den Haag II	A. H. Gerhard	Social Democratic Workers' Party	537	7.15		
Den Haag II	J. D. Six	Free Liberals	372	4.95		
Den Haag II	Valid votes		7,515	98.53	7,951	99.45
Den Haag II	Invalid/blank votes		112	1.47	44	0.55
Den Haag II	Total votes		7,627	100	7,995	100
Den Haag II	Registered voters/turnout		9,444	80.76	9,444	84.66
Den Haag III	J. C. Jansen	Liberal Union	3,090	42.71	4,608	63.60
Den Haag III	W. C. A. baron van Vredenburch	National Historical Party	2,572	35.55	2,637	36.40
Den Haag III	E. B. Kielstra	Free Liberals	1,111	15.36		
Den Haag III	P. J. Troelstra	Social Democratic Workers' Party	406	5.61		
Den Haag III	H. van Munster	Christian Democratic Party	56	0.77		
Den Haag III	Valid votes		7,235	98.89	7,245	99.52
Den Haag III	Invalid/blank votes		81	1.11	35	0.48
Den Haag III	Total votes		7,316	100	7,280	100
Den Haag III	Registered voters/turnout		9,253	79.07	9,253	78.68
Den Helder	C. V. Gerritsen	Free-thinking Democratic League	3,111	51.03		
Den Helder	A. P. Staalman	Christian Democratic Party	2,276	37.34		
Den Helder	L. Adriaanse	Anti-Revolutionary Party	491	8.05		
Den Helder	A. H. Gerhard	Social Democratic Workers' Party	218	3.58		
Den Helder	Valid votes		6,096	98.72		
Den Helder	Invalid/blank votes		79	1.28		
Den Helder	Total votes		6,175	100		
Den Helder	Registered voters/turnout		7,641	80.81		
Deventer	H. P. Marchant	Free-thinking Democratic League	3,846	59.95		
Deventer	Th. Heemskerk	Anti-Revolutionary Party	2,347	36.59		
Deventer	F. van der Goes	Social Democratic Workers' Party	222	3.46		
Deventer	Valid votes		6,415	99.06		
Deventer	Invalid/blank votes		61	0.94		
Deventer	Total votes		6,476	100		
Deventer	Registered voters/turnout		7,454	86.88		
Doetinchem	P. van Vliet	Anti-Revolutionary Party	5,858	56.72		
Doetinchem	D. Brocx	Liberal Union	4,042	39.14		
Doetinchem	L. M. Hermans	Social Democratic Workers' Party	428	4.14		
Doetinchem	Valid votes		10,328	99.29		
Doetinchem	Invalid/blank votes		74	0.71		
Doetinchem	Total votes		10,402	100		
Doetinchem	Registered voters/turnout		10,819	96.15		
Dokkum	R. van Veen	Christian Historical Party	3,556	54.65		
Dokkum	E. Schaafsma	Liberal Union	2,362	36.30		
Dokkum	A. van der Heide	Social Democratic Workers' Party	589	9.05		
Dokkum	Valid votes		6,507	99.37		
Dokkum	Invalid/blank votes		41	0.63		
Dokkum	Total votes		6,548	100		
Dokkum	Registered voters/turnout		7,199	90.96		
Dordrecht	A. S. Talma	Anti-Revolutionary Party	3,208	47.38	3,387	47.62
Dordrecht	S. M. H. van Gijn	Liberal Union	2,824	41.71	3,725	52.38
Dordrecht	J. H. F. van Zadelhoff	Social Democratic Workers' Party	739	10.91		
Dordrecht	Valid votes		6,771	98.54	7,112	99.16
Dordrecht	Invalid/blank votes		100	1.46	60	0.84
Dordrecht	Total votes		6,871	100	7,172	100
Dordrecht	Registered voters/turnout		7,805	88.03	7,805	91.89
Druten	T. J. A. Duijnstee	General League	2,576	65.08		
Druten	J. W. J. C. M. van Nispen tot Sevenaer	General League	1,295	32.72		
Druten	E. P. F. A. van den Bogaert	General League	87	2.20		
Druten	Valid votes		3,958	98.24		
Druten	Invalid/blank votes		71	1.76		
Druten	Total votes		4,029	100		
Druten	Registered voters/turnout		6,067	66.41		
Ede	M. A. Brants	Anti-Revolutionary Party	3,075	67.36		
Ede	P. Tideman	Free Liberals	1,283	28.11		
Ede	S. Lindeman	Social Democratic Workers' Party	207	4.53		
Ede	Valid votes		4,565	97.86		
Ede	Invalid/blank votes		100	2.14		
Ede	Total votes		4,665	100		
Ede	Registered voters/turnout		6,762	68.99		
Eindhoven	V. A. M. van den Heuvel	General League	4,425	90.96		
Eindhoven	J. A. H. van den Brink	Social Democratic Workers' Party	440	9.04		
Eindhoven	Valid votes		4,865	98.60		
Eindhoven	Invalid/blank votes		69	1.40		
Eindhoven	Total votes		4,934	100		
Eindhoven	Registered voters/turnout		6,814	72.41		
Elst	A. I. M. J. baron van Wijnbergen	General League	4,318	64.69		
Elst	F. J. W. baron van Pallandt van Rosendael	Independent	1,920	28.76		
Elst	S. Lindeman	Social Democratic Workers' Party	437	6.55		
Elst	Valid votes		6,675	98.18		
Elst	Invalid/blank votes		124	1.82		
Elst	Total votes		6,799	100		
Elst	Registered voters/turnout		8,188	83.04		
Emmen	P. H. Roessingh	Liberal Union	4,140	67.72		
Emmen	P. Wielinga	Anti-Revolutionary Party	1,973	32.28		
Emmen	Valid votes		6,113	98.56		
Emmen	Invalid/blank votes		89	1.44		
Emmen	Total votes		6,202	100		
Emmen	Registered voters/turnout		7,304	84.91		
Enkhuizen	N. Sluis	Anti-Revolutionary Party	4,582	49.17	4,714	49.46
Enkhuizen	H. Goeman Borgesius	Liberal Union	4,504	48.33	4,817	50.54
Enkhuizen	H. Gorter	Social Democratic Workers' Party	124	1.33		
Enkhuizen	A. P. Staalman	Christian Democratic Party	109	1.17		
Enkhuizen	Valid votes		9,319	99.33	9,531	99.77
Enkhuizen	Invalid/blank votes		63	0.67	22	0.23
Enkhuizen	Total votes		9,382	100	9,553	100
Enkhuizen	Registered voters/turnout		9,717	96.55	9,717	98.31
Enschede	A. H. J. Engels	General League	6,192	45.92	6,440	46.84
Enschede	H. H. van Kol	Social Democratic Workers' Party	4,118	30.54	7,310	53.16
Enschede	D. Brocx	Liberal Union	3,020	22.40		
Enschede	A. Kreuzen Azn.	Christian Democratic Party	153	1.13		
Enschede	Valid votes		13,483	98.96	13,750	99.24
Enschede	Invalid/blank votes		142	1.04	105	0.76
Enschede	Total votes		13,625	100	13,855	100
Enschede	Registered voters/turnout		14,396	94.64	14,396	96.24
Franeker	J. Ankerman	Frisian League	2,880	41.86	3,179	44.64
Franeker	P. L. Tak	Social Democratic Workers' Party	2,170	31.54	3,943	55.36
Franeker	F. Lieftinck	Liberal Union	1,830	26.60		
Franeker	Valid votes		6,880	99.41	7,122	99.39
Franeker	Invalid/blank votes		41	0.59	44	0.61
Franeker	Total votes		6,921	100	7,166	100
Franeker	Registered voters/turnout		7,669	90.25	7,669	93.44
Goes	A. F. de Savornin Lohman	Christian Historical Party	3,184	59.37		
Goes	G. A. Vorsterman van Oyen	Free-thinking Democratic League	1,963	36.60		
Goes	P. J. Troelstra	Social Democratic Workers' Party	216	4.03		
Goes	Valid votes		5,363	98.58		
Goes	Invalid/blank votes		77	1.42		
Goes	Total votes		5,440	100		
Goes	Registered voters/turnout		6,620	82.18		
Gorinchem	N. G. Pierson	Liberal Union	3,506	50.76		
Gorinchem	L. van Andel	Anti-Revolutionary Party	3,401	49.24		
Gorinchem	Valid votes		6,907	98.59		
Gorinchem	Invalid/blank votes		99	1.41		
Gorinchem	Total votes		7,006	100		
Gorinchem	Registered voters/turnout		7,594	92.26		
Gouda	S. de Vries Cz.	Independent	3,680	47.11	3,963	48.47
Gouda	W. T. C. van Doorn	Liberal Union	3,361	43.03	4,213	51.53
Gouda	H. Gorter	Social Democratic Workers' Party	669	8.56		
Gouda	A. P. Staalman	Christian Democratic Party	101	1.29		
Gouda	Valid votes		7,811	98.99	8,176	99.36
Gouda	Invalid/blank votes		80	1.01	53	0.64
Gouda	Total votes		7,891	100	8,229	100
Gouda	Registered voters/turnout		8,663	91.09	8,663	94.99
Grave	D. A. P. N. Koolen	General League	2,499	49.51	3,001	55.26
Grave	J. J. I. Harte van Tecklenburg	General League	2,270	44.98	2,430	44.74
Grave	J. M. P. Broeder	General League	278	5.51		
Grave	Valid votes		5,047	97.90	5,431	98.96
Grave	Invalid/blank votes		108	2.10	57	1.04
Grave	Total votes		5,155	100	5,488	100
Grave	Registered voters/turnout		6,414	80.37	6,414	85.56
Groningen	H. L. Drucker	Free-thinking Democratic League	2,573	39.35	4,405	67.19
Groningen	A. F. de Savornin Lohman	Christian Historical Party	1,897	29.01	2,151	32.81
Groningen	H. Gorter	Social Democratic Workers' Party	1,230	18.81		
Groningen	J. baron van Aulnis de Bourouill	Free Liberals	815	12.46		
Groningen	F. van der Pers	Christian Democratic Party	24	0.37		
Groningen	Valid votes		6,539	98.81	6,556	99.48
Groningen	Invalid/blank votes		79	1.19	34	0.52
Groningen	Total votes		6,618	100	6,590	100
Groningen	Registered voters/turnout		7,849	84.32	7,849	83.96
Gulpen	C. J. M. Ruijs de Beerenbrouck	General League	3,297	64.89		
Gulpen	J. H. Pinckers	General League	1,606	31.61		
Gulpen	H. H. van Kol	Social Democratic Workers' Party	178	3.50		
Gulpen	Valid votes		5,081	96.95		
Gulpen	Invalid/blank votes		160	3.05		
Gulpen	Total votes		5,241	100		
Gulpen	Registered voters/turnout		7,031	74.54		
Haarlem	F. K. van Lennep	Christian Historical Party	3,022	45.63	3,589	47.04
Haarlem	F. W. van Styrum	Free Liberals	2,125	32.09	4,040	52.96
Haarlem	F. W. N. Hugenholtz	Social Democratic Workers' Party	1,072	16.19		
Haarlem	F. C. J. Netscher	Free-thinking Democratic League	404	6.10		
Haarlem	Valid votes		6,623	98.85	7,629	99.43
Haarlem	Invalid/blank votes		77	1.15	44	0.57
Haarlem	Total votes		6,700	100	7,673	100
Haarlem	Registered voters/turnout		8,665	77.32	8,665	88.55
Haarlemmermeer	F. H. van Wichen	General League	5,530	63.81		
Haarlemmermeer	W. P. Ruijsch	Liberal Union	2,152	24.83		
Haarlemmermeer	W. H. Lieftinck	Christian Democratic Party	531	6.13		
Haarlemmermeer	J. Gerritz	Social Democratic Workers' Party	453	5.23		
Haarlemmermeer	Valid votes		8,666	98.41		
Haarlemmermeer	Invalid/blank votes		140	1.59		
Haarlemmermeer	Total votes		8,806	100		
Haarlemmermeer	Registered voters/turnout		10,117	87.04		
Harlingen	J. Schokking	Frisian League	3,645	55.89		
Harlingen	L. W. J. K. Thomson	Liberal Union	2,277	34.91		
Harlingen	A. van der Heide	Social Democratic Workers' Party	600	9.20		
Harlingen	Valid votes		6,522	99.06		
Harlingen	Invalid/blank votes		62	0.94		
Harlingen	Total votes		6,584	100		
Harlingen	Registered voters/turnout		7,179	91.71		
Helmond	E. R. H. Regout	General League	Unopposed			
Hilversum	S. baron van Heemstra II	Anti-Revolutionary Party	4,464	54.55		
Hilversum	N. H. van Roggen	Free-thinking Democratic League	1,996	24.39		
Hilversum	J. J. B. Fanoy	Christian Historical Party	821	10.03		
Hilversum	H. Gorter	Social Democratic Workers' Party	791	9.67		
Hilversum	W. H. Lieftinck	Christian Democratic Party	112	1.37		
Hilversum	Valid votes		8,184	98.47		
Hilversum	Invalid/blank votes		127	1.53		
Hilversum	Total votes		8,311	100		
Hilversum	Registered voters/turnout		10,026	82.89		
Hontenisse	P. F. Fruijtier	General League	3,341	54.87		
Hontenisse	J. G. van Deinse	Liberal Union	2,488	40.86		
Hontenisse	J. A. H. van den Brink	Social Democratic Workers' Party	260	4.27		
Hontenisse	Valid votes		6,089	98.54		
Hontenisse	Invalid/blank votes		90	1.46		
Hontenisse	Total votes		6,179	100		
Hontenisse	Registered voters/turnout		7,077	87.31		
Hoogezand	K. ter Laan	Social Democratic Workers' Party	2,320	42.35	3,193	63.38
Hoogezand	H. de Wilde	Anti-Revolutionary Party	1,612	29.43	1,845	36.62
Hoogezand	U. G. Schilthuis Jzn.	Free-thinking Democratic League	1,546	28.22		
Hoogezand	Valid votes		5,478	98.99	5,038	99.19
Hoogezand	Invalid/blank votes		56	1.01	41	0.81
Hoogezand	Total votes		5,534	100	5,079	100
Hoogezand	Registered voters/turnout		6,396	86.52	6,396	79.41
Hoorn	P. B. J. Ferf	Liberal Union	3,431	52.99		
Hoorn	J. N. J. E. Thijssen	General League	2,219	34.27		
Hoorn	J. Loopuit	Social Democratic Workers' Party	825	12.74		
Hoorn	Valid votes		6,475	98.79		
Hoorn	Invalid/blank votes		79	1.21		
Hoorn	Total votes		6,554	100		
Hoorn	Registered voters/turnout		7,578	86.49		
Kampen	K. Reyne	Liberal Union	2,542	42.24	3,210	50.65
Kampen	M. Noordtzij	Anti-Revolutionary Party	2,358	39.18	3,127	49.35
Kampen	J. Schokking	Frisian League	1,043	17.33		
Kampen	J. Loopuit	Social Democratic Workers' Party	75	1.25		
Kampen	Valid votes		6,018	98.95	6,337	98.62
Kampen	Invalid/blank votes		64	1.05	89	1.38
Kampen	Total votes		6,082	100	6,426	100
Kampen	Registered voters/turnout		6,791	89.56	6,791	94.63
Katwijk	O. J. E. baron van Wassenaer van Catwijck	Christian Historical Party	5,569	83.47		
Katwijk	H. Goeman Borgesius	Liberal Union	1,103	16.53		
Katwijk	Valid votes		6,672	98.65		
Katwijk	Invalid/blank votes		91	1.35		
Katwijk	Total votes		6,763	100		
Katwijk	Registered voters/turnout		8,117	83.32		
Leeuwarden	F. M. Wibaut	Social Democratic Workers' Party	2,270	36.15	2,933	45.39
Leeuwarden	L. W. J. K. Thomson	Liberal Union	2,228	35.48	3,529	54.61
Leeuwarden	T. A. Hettinga	General League	1,439	22.91		
Leeuwarden	M. W. F. Treub	Free-thinking Democratic League	343	5.46		
Leeuwarden	Valid votes		6,280	98.87	6,462	99.37
Leeuwarden	Invalid/blank votes		72	1.13	41	0.63
Leeuwarden	Total votes		6,352	100	6,503	100
Leeuwarden	Registered voters/turnout		7,553	84.10	7,553	86.10
Leiden	T. G. den Houter	Anti-Revolutionary Party	2,446	45.63	2,707	48.19
Leiden	W. van der Vlugt	Free Liberals	2,276	42.45	2,910	51.81
Leiden	C. Plug	Frisian League	294	5.48		
Leiden	F. van der Goes	Social Democratic Workers' Party	194	3.62		
Leiden	M. W. F. Treub	Free-thinking Democratic League	151	2.82		
Leiden	Valid votes		5,361	98.53	5,617	99.08
Leiden	Invalid/blank votes		80	1.47	52	0.92
Leiden	Total votes		5,441	100	5,669	100
Leiden	Registered voters/turnout		6,075	89.56	6,075	93.32
Lochem	N. Oosterbaan	Anti-Revolutionary Party	3,069	37.82	3,290	40.43
Lochem	G. Jannink	Liberal Union	2,848	35.10	4,848	59.57
Lochem	W. P. G. Helsdingen	Social Democratic Workers' Party	2,198	27.09		
Lochem	Valid votes		8,115	99.05	8,138	99.03
Lochem	Invalid/blank votes		78	0.95	80	0.97
Lochem	Total votes		8,193	100	8,218	100
Lochem	Registered voters/turnout		8,872	92.35	8,872	92.63
Loosduinen	A. Brummelkamp Jr.	Anti-Revolutionary Party	5,378	70.06		
Loosduinen	A. Ferf	Liberal Union	2,298	29.94		
Loosduinen	Valid votes		7,676	98.50		
Loosduinen	Invalid/blank votes		117	1.50		
Loosduinen	Total votes		7,793	100		
Loosduinen	Registered voters/turnout		8,951	87.06		
Maastricht	F. I. J. Janssen	General League	2,620	74.52		
Maastricht	S. P. Baart	Social Democratic Workers' Party	896	25.48		
Maastricht	Valid votes		3,516	98.16		
Maastricht	Invalid/blank votes		66	1.84		
Maastricht	Total votes		3,582	100		
Maastricht	Registered voters/turnout		5,960	60.10		
Meppel	H. Smeenge	Liberal Union	3,515	57.34		
Meppel	J. Knoppers	Christian Historical Party	2,495	40.70		
Meppel	A. van der Heide	Social Democratic Workers' Party	120	1.96		
Meppel	Valid votes		6,130	98.93		
Meppel	Invalid/blank votes		66	1.07		
Meppel	Total votes		6,196	100		
Meppel	Registered voters/turnout		6,932	89.38		
Middelburg	C. Lucasse	Anti-Revolutionary Party	4,180	50.70		
Middelburg	H. Snijders	Free-thinking Democratic League	3,542	42.96		
Middelburg	J. A. Bergmeyer	Social Democratic Workers' Party	523	6.34		
Middelburg	Valid votes		8,245	98.92		
Middelburg	Invalid/blank votes		90	1.08		
Middelburg	Total votes		8,335	100		
Middelburg	Registered voters/turnout		9,151	91.08		
Nijmegen	O. F. A. M. van Nispen tot Sevenaer	General League	2,941	79.40		
Nijmegen	A. H. Gerhard	Social Democratic Workers' Party	763	20.60		
Nijmegen	Valid votes		3,704	96.56		
Nijmegen	Invalid/blank votes		132	3.44		
Nijmegen	Total votes		3,836	100		
Nijmegen	Registered voters/turnout		6,733	56.97		
Ommen	J. van Alphen	Anti-Revolutionary Party	4,114	57.20		
Ommen	W. J. M. Engelberts	Free Liberals	3,078	42.80		
Ommen	Valid votes		7,192	98.60		
Ommen	Invalid/blank votes		102	1.40		
Ommen	Total votes		7,294	100		
Ommen	Registered voters/turnout		8,078	90.29		
Oostburg	P. C. J. Hennequin	Free Liberals	4,375	60.32		
Oostburg	J. H. Blum	Anti-Revolutionary Party	2,610	35.99		
Oostburg	G. W. Sannes	Social Democratic Workers' Party	268	3.70		
Oostburg	Valid votes		7,253	99.10		
Oostburg	Invalid/blank votes		66	0.90		
Oostburg	Total votes		7,319	100		
Oostburg	Registered voters/turnout		8,152	89.78		
Oosterhout	I. B. D. van den Berch van Heemstede	General League	3,470	74.66		
Oosterhout	J. N. J. E. Thijssen	General League	825	17.75		
Oosterhout	F. J. Potter	Liberal Union	353	7.59		
Oosterhout	Valid votes		4,648	98.12		
Oosterhout	Invalid/blank votes		89	1.88		
Oosterhout	Total votes		4,737	100		
Oosterhout	Registered voters/turnout		6,784	69.83		
Rheden	M. J. C. M. Kolkman	General League	3,223	74.38		
Rheden	K. Eland	Liberal Union	1,110	25.62		
Rheden	Valid votes		4,333	98.34		
Rheden	Invalid/blank votes		73	1.66		
Rheden	Total votes		4,406	100		
Rheden	Registered voters/turnout		7,056	62.44		
Ridderkerk	A. P. R. C. baron van Borch van Verwolde	Anti-Revolutionary Party	3,694	50.12		
Ridderkerk	A. Smit	Liberal Union	3,676	49.88		
Ridderkerk	Valid votes		7,370	99.47		
Ridderkerk	Invalid/blank votes		39	0.53		
Ridderkerk	Total votes		7,409	100		
Ridderkerk	Registered voters/turnout		7,731	95.83		
Roermond	F. J. Bolsius	General League	Unopposed			
Rotterdam I	J. W. Rudolph	Anti-Revolutionary Party	2,782	43.64	3,056	45.94
Rotterdam I	D. Fock	Liberal Union	2,417	37.91	3,596	54.06
Rotterdam I	H. Spiekman	Social Democratic Workers' Party	1,176	18.45		
Rotterdam I	Valid votes		6,375	99.07	6,652	99.43
Rotterdam I	Invalid/blank votes		60	0.93	38	0.57
Rotterdam I	Total votes		6,435	100	6,690	100
Rotterdam I	Registered voters/turnout		7,357	87.47	7,357	90.93
Rotterdam II	J. T. de Visser	Christian Historical Party	3,151	46.12	3,328	46.50
Rotterdam II	D. de Klerk	Liberal Union	3,124	45.73	3,829	53.50
Rotterdam II	P. J. Helsdingen	Social Democratic Workers' Party	557	8.15		
Rotterdam II	Valid votes		6,832	99.19	7,157	99.53
Rotterdam II	Invalid/blank votes		56	0.81	34	0.47
Rotterdam II	Total votes		6,888	100	7,191	100
Rotterdam II	Registered voters/turnout		7,751	88.87	7,751	92.78
Rotterdam III	J. B. Verhey	Liberal Union	2,093	54.36		
Rotterdam III	K. A. Warmenhoven Jr.	Christian Historical Party	1,553	40.34		
Rotterdam III	F. van der Goes	Social Democratic Workers' Party	204	5.30		
Rotterdam III	Valid votes		3,850	99.15		
Rotterdam III	Invalid/blank votes		33	0.85		
Rotterdam III	Total votes		3,883	100		
Rotterdam III	Registered voters/turnout		4,600	84.41		
Rotterdam IV	J. M. Voorhoeve II	Anti-Revolutionary Party	2,858	46.09	3,057	47.18
Rotterdam IV	A. Plate	Free Liberals	2,825	45.56	3,422	52.82
Rotterdam IV	J. van Leeuwen	Social Democratic Workers' Party	476	7.68		
Rotterdam IV	P. van der Pols	Anti-Revolutionary Party	42	0.68		
Rotterdam IV	Valid votes		6,201	99.42	6,479	99.43
Rotterdam IV	Invalid/blank votes		36	0.58	37	0.57
Rotterdam IV	Total votes		6,237	100	6,516	100
Rotterdam IV	Registered voters/turnout		7,223	86.35	7,223	90.21
Rotterdam V	E. E. van Raalte	Liberal Union	2,136	49.15	2,523	54.41
Rotterdam V	A. Brummelkamp Jr.	Anti-Revolutionary Party	1,975	45.44	2,114	45.59
Rotterdam V	J. H. F. van Zadelhoff	Social Democratic Workers' Party	235	5.41		
Rotterdam V	Valid votes		4,346	98.91	4,637	99.40
Rotterdam V	Invalid/blank votes		48	1.09	28	0.60
Rotterdam V	Total votes		4,394	100	4,665	100
Rotterdam V	Registered voters/turnout		5,431	80.91	5,431	85.90
Schiedam	O. J. H. graaf van Limburg Stirum	Christian Historical Party	3,953	60.70		
Schiedam	M. C. M. de Groot	Free-thinking Democratic League	1,642	25.21		
Schiedam	J. van Leeuwen	Social Democratic Workers' Party	917	14.08		
Schiedam	Valid votes		6,512	98.89		
Schiedam	Invalid/blank votes		73	1.11		
Schiedam	Total votes		6,585	100		
Schiedam	Registered voters/turnout		7,696	85.56		
Schoterland	G. L. van der Zwaag	Social Democratic Workers' Party	2,085	43.83	3,172	63.89
Schoterland	J. Huizinga	Anti-Revolutionary Party	1,342	28.21	1,793	36.11
Schoterland	C. V. Gerritsen	Free-thinking Democratic League	1,330	27.96		
Schoterland	Valid votes		4,757	98.75	4,965	99.12
Schoterland	Invalid/blank votes		60	1.25	44	0.88
Schoterland	Total votes		4,817	100	5,009	100
Schoterland	Registered voters/turnout		6,365	75.68	6,365	78.70
Sittard	J. H. J. Beckers	General League	1,919	85.63		
Sittard	J. J. A. Kamps	General League	322	14.37		
Sittard	Valid votes		2,241	96.30		
Sittard	Invalid/blank votes		86	3.70		
Sittard	Total votes		2,327	100		
Sittard	Registered voters/turnout		6,935	33.55		
Sliedrecht	Th. Heemskerk	Anti-Revolutionary Party	2,827	48.09	3,270	51.40
Sliedrecht	H. Smissaert	Free Liberals	2,046	34.81	3,092	48.60
Sliedrecht	J. Ankerman	Frisian League	750	12.76		
Sliedrecht	L. M. Hermans	Social Democratic Workers' Party	255	4.34		
Sliedrecht	Valid votes		5,878	98.11	6,362	98.94
Sliedrecht	Invalid/blank votes		113	1.89	68	1.06
Sliedrecht	Total votes		5,991	100	6,430	100
Sliedrecht	Registered voters/turnout		7,135	83.97	7,135	90.12
Sneek	H. Okma	Anti-Revolutionary Party	2,837	47.08	3,633	56.70
Sneek	C. J. Niemeijer	Liberal Union	2,020	33.52	2,774	43.30
Sneek	H. van Eijck van Heslinga	Frisian League	959	15.91		
Sneek	A. P. Staalman	Christian Democratic Party	210	3.48		
Sneek	Valid votes		6,026	98.84	6,407	99.27
Sneek	Invalid/blank votes		71	1.16	47	0.73
Sneek	Total votes		6,097	100	6,454	100
Sneek	Registered voters/turnout		7,183	84.88	7,183	89.85
Steenwijk	L. F. Duymaer van Twist	Anti-Revolutionary Party	3,231	50.23		
Steenwijk	J. H. Tromp Meesters	Liberal Union	3,202	49.77		
Steenwijk	Valid votes		6,433	98.97		
Steenwijk	Invalid/blank votes		67	1.03		
Steenwijk	Total votes		6,500	100		
Steenwijk	Registered voters/turnout		7,007	92.76		
Tiel	M. Tydeman Jr.	Free Liberals	2,666	60.66		
Tiel	C. van der Voort van Zijp	Anti-Revolutionary Party	1,453	33.06		
Tiel	H. P. de Wilde	Free-thinking Democratic League	276	6.28		
Tiel	Valid votes		4,395	95.09		
Tiel	Invalid/blank votes		227	4.91		
Tiel	Total votes		4,622	100		
Tiel	Registered voters/turnout		5,935	77.88		
Tietjerksteradeel	A. S. Talma	Anti-Revolutionary Party	3,851	53.22		
Tietjerksteradeel	H. Goeman Borgesius	Liberal Union	1,916	26.48		
Tietjerksteradeel	P. J. Troelstra	Social Democratic Workers' Party	1,469	20.30		
Tietjerksteradeel	Valid votes		7,236	99.37		
Tietjerksteradeel	Invalid/blank votes		46	0.63		
Tietjerksteradeel	Total votes		7,282	100		
Tietjerksteradeel	Registered voters/turnout		7,880	92.41		
Tilburg	A. H. A. Arts	General League	3,202	70.48		
Tilburg	F. P. J. M. van Dooren	General League	779	17.15		
Tilburg	A. Mutsaers	General League	295	6.49		
Tilburg	J. A. Bergmeyer	Social Democratic Workers' Party	267	5.88		
Tilburg	Valid votes		4,543	98.27		
Tilburg	Invalid/blank votes		80	1.73		
Tilburg	Total votes		4,623	100		
Tilburg	Registered voters/turnout		6,459	71.57		
Utrecht I	G. C. von Weiler	Christian Historical Party	2,729	39.38	3,001	42.04
Utrecht I	A. P. C. van Karnebeek	Free Liberals	2,585	37.30	4,137	57.96
Utrecht I	M. Mendels	Social Democratic Workers' Party	1,168	16.85		
Utrecht I	H. L. Drucker	Free-thinking Democratic League	448	6.46		
Utrecht I	Valid votes		6,930	98.94	7,138	99.44
Utrecht I	Invalid/blank votes		74	1.06	40	0.56
Utrecht I	Total votes		7,004	100	7,178	100
Utrecht I	Registered voters/turnout		8,000	87.55	8,000	89.73
Utrecht II	N. de Ridder	Anti-Revolutionary Party	2,422	46.19	2,544	45.84
Utrecht II	J. Roëll	Free Liberals	1,351	25.77	3,006	54.16
Utrecht II	J. Oudegeest	Social Democratic Workers' Party	963	18.37		
Utrecht II	M. W. F. Treub	Free-thinking Democratic League	507	9.67		
Utrecht II	Valid votes		5,243	98.74	5,550	99.46
Utrecht II	Invalid/blank votes		67	1.26	30	0.54
Utrecht II	Total votes		5,310	100	5,580	100
Utrecht II	Registered voters/turnout		6,087	87.24	6,087	91.67
Veendam	E. A. Smidt	Free-thinking Democratic League	2,340	38.43	4,220	66.10
Veendam	G. J. Sybrandy	Anti-Revolutionary Party	2,050	33.67	2,164	33.90
Veendam	H. Spiekman	Social Democratic Workers' Party	1,699	27.90		
Veendam	Valid votes		6,089	98.34	6,384	99.19
Veendam	Invalid/blank votes		103	1.66	52	0.81
Veendam	Total votes		6,192	100	6,436	100
Veendam	Registered voters/turnout		7,551	82.00	7,551	85.23
Veghel	B. R. F. van Vlijmen	General League	Unopposed			
Venlo	W. H. Nolens	General League	Unopposed			
Waalwijk	J. A. Loeff	General League	Unopposed			
Weert	V. E. L. de Stuers	General League	Unopposed			
Weststellingwerf	F. W. N. Hugenholtz	Social Democratic Workers' Party	2,217	40.53	3,460	60.82
Weststellingwerf	J. van der Molen Tz.	Anti-Revolutionary Party	2,007	36.69	2,229	39.18
Weststellingwerf	C. A. Zelvelder	Free-thinking Democratic League	1,246	22.78		
Weststellingwerf	Valid votes		5,470	99.40	5,689	99.28
Weststellingwerf	Invalid/blank votes		33	0.60	41	0.72
Weststellingwerf	Total votes		5,503	100	5,730	100
Weststellingwerf	Registered voters/turnout		6,653	82.71	6,653	86.13
Wijk bij Duurstede	N. de Ridder	Anti-Revolutionary Party	4,233	65.86		
Wijk bij Duurstede	H. C. Dresselhuys	Free Liberals	2,065	32.13		
Wijk bij Duurstede	J. Oudegeest	Social Democratic Workers' Party	129	2.01		
Wijk bij Duurstede	Valid votes		6,427	98.26		
Wijk bij Duurstede	Invalid/blank votes		114	1.74		
Wijk bij Duurstede	Total votes		6,541	100		
Wijk bij Duurstede	Registered voters/turnout		7,715	84.78		
Winschoten	D. Bos	Free-thinking Democratic League	2,396	55.31		
Winschoten	J. F. Heemskerk	Anti-Revolutionary Party	999	23.06		
Winschoten	H. J. Kenter	Social Democratic Workers' Party	873	20.15		
Winschoten	H. Thoden van Velzen	Free Liberals	64	1.48		
Winschoten	Valid votes		4,332	97.68		
Winschoten	Invalid/blank votes		103	2.32		
Winschoten	Total votes		4,435	100		
Winschoten	Registered voters/turnout		6,877	64.49		
Zaandam	K. de Boer	Liberal Union	2,609	37.80	4,135	59.66
Zaandam	M. Mendels	Social Democratic Workers' Party	2,392	34.66	2,796	40.34
Zaandam	J. Windhouwer	Anti-Revolutionary Party	1,901	27.54		
Zaandam	Valid votes		6,902	98.70	6,931	99.18
Zaandam	Invalid/blank votes		91	1.30	57	0.82
Zaandam	Total votes		6,993	100	6,988	100
Zaandam	Registered voters/turnout		8,980	77.87	8,980	77.82
Zevenbergen	W. H. Bogaardt	General League	2,088	46.27	2,295	49.64
Zevenbergen	A. C. A. van Vuuren	General League	1,325	29.36	2,328	50.36
Zevenbergen	W. H. E. van der Borch van Verwolde	Independent	581	12.87		
Zevenbergen	A. G. J. Mastboom	General League	519	11.50		
Zevenbergen	Valid votes		4,513	98.43	4,623	99.06
Zevenbergen	Invalid/blank votes		72	1.57	44	0.94
Zevenbergen	Total votes		4,585	100	4,667	100
Zevenbergen	Registered voters/turnout		6,393	71.72	6,393	73.00
Zierikzee	R. J. H. Patijn	Liberal Union	3,339	49.34	3,709	52.92
Zierikzee	J. J. Pompe van Meerdervoort	Anti-Revolutionary Party	3,195	47.21	3,300	47.08
Zierikzee	W. H. Vliegen	Social Democratic Workers' Party	234	3.46		
Zierikzee	Valid votes		6,768	98.99	7,009	99.49
Zierikzee	Invalid/blank votes		69	1.01	36	0.51
Zierikzee	Total votes		6,837	100	7,045	100
Zierikzee	Registered voters/turnout		7,412	92.24	7,412	95.05
Zuidhorn	D. G. Postma	Anti-Revolutionary Party	3,197	45.37	3,323	45.69
Zuidhorn	G. Zijlma	Liberal Union	2,726	38.68	3,950	54.31
Zuidhorn	W. H. Vliegen	Social Democratic Workers' Party	1,124	15.95		
Zuidhorn	Valid votes		7,047	98.79	7,273	99.22
Zuidhorn	Invalid/blank votes		86	1.21	57	0.78
Zuidhorn	Total votes		7,133	100	7,330	100
Zuidhorn	Registered voters/turnout		7,880	90.52	7,880	93.02
Zutphen	H. Goeman Borgesius	Liberal Union	3,489	46.64	4,137	54.34
Zutphen	A. S. Talma	Anti-Revolutionary Party	3,368	45.03	3,476	45.66
Zutphen	F. van der Goes	Social Democratic Workers' Party	623	8.33		
Zutphen	Valid votes		7,480	98.89	7,613	99.43
Zutphen	Invalid/blank votes		84	1.11	44	0.57
Zutphen	Total votes		7,564	100	7,657	100
Zutphen	Registered voters/turnout		8,175	92.53	8,175	93.66
Zwolle	A. baron van Dedem	Christian Historical Party	3,345	54.72		
Zwolle	J. A. van Gilse	Free-thinking Democratic League	2,394	39.16		
Zwolle	J. Oudegeest	Social Democratic Workers' Party	374	6.12		
Zwolle	Valid votes		6,113	97.51		
Zwolle	Invalid/blank votes		156	2.49		
Zwolle	Total votes		6,269	100		
Zwolle	Registered voters/turnout		7,067	88.71		

== See also ==
- 1905 Dutch cabinet formation
