= Jan Schokking =

Dutch politician

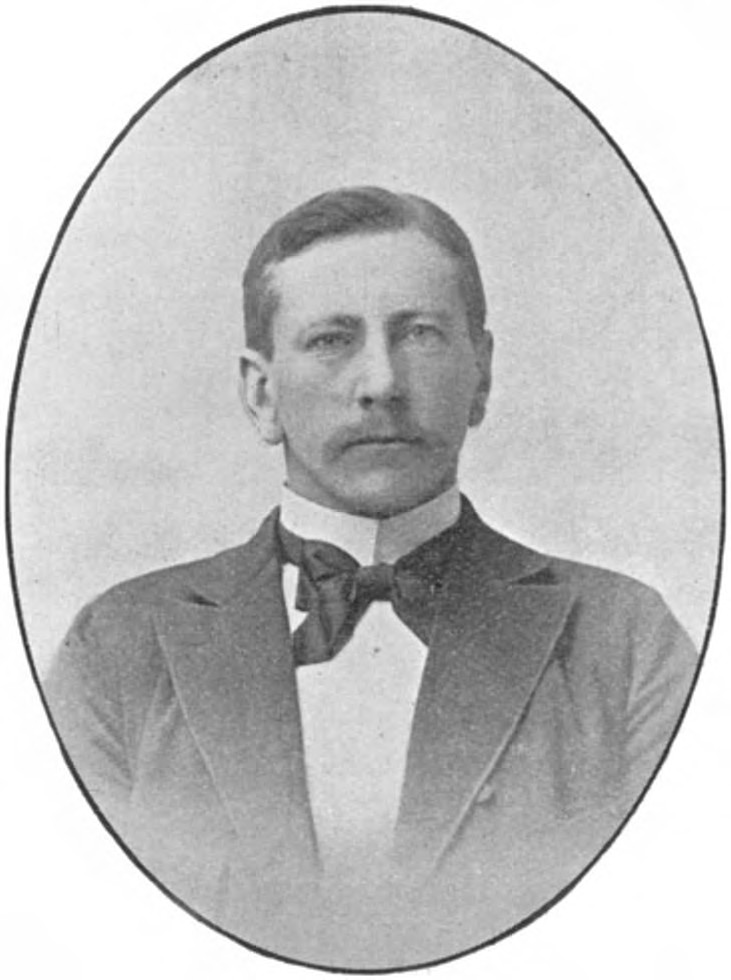
Jan Schokking ca. 1901

Jan Schokking (10 May 1864, Amsterdam – 15 July 1941, The Hague) was a Dutch politician and Christian minister.

He was party chair of the Christian Historical Union (CHU), mayor of Katwijk, an MP and also minister of Justice.

House of Representatives of the Netherlands
Preceded by Abraham Bouman	Member for Harlingen; 1901–1909	Succeeded by Jan Ankerman
Party political offices
Preceded by Alexander de Savornin Lohman	Leader of the Christian Historical Union in the House of Representatives; 1921–1925	Succeeded by Johannes Theodoor de Visser
Preceded by Johannes Theodoor de Visser	Leader of the Christian Historical Union in the House of Representatives; 1929–1932	Succeeded by Reinhardt Snoeck Henkemans
Political offices
Preceded by Theo Heemskerk	Minister of Justice; 1925–1926	Succeeded by Jan Donner
Preceded by Jan Hendrik de Waal Malefijt	Mayor of Katwijk; 1927–1932	Succeeded by Wicher Woldringh van der Hoop
