= Coalition (Netherlands) =

The Coalition is a historic coalition between three confessional parties of Netherlands - the Christian Historical Union, Anti-Revolutionary Party and Roman Catholic State Party. They were united in their common struggle for equal financing for religious schools. They were opposed to the Concentration. The Coalition governed between 1888 and 1891, led by Æneas Mackay, 1901 and 1905 led by Abraham Kuyper, 1908 and 1913 led by Theo Heemskerk and between 1918 and 1940 led by several politicians, Hendrikus Colijn, Dirk Jan de Geer and Charles Ruijs de Beerenbrouck.
