= Hendrik Wortman =

Dutch civil engineer (1859–1939)

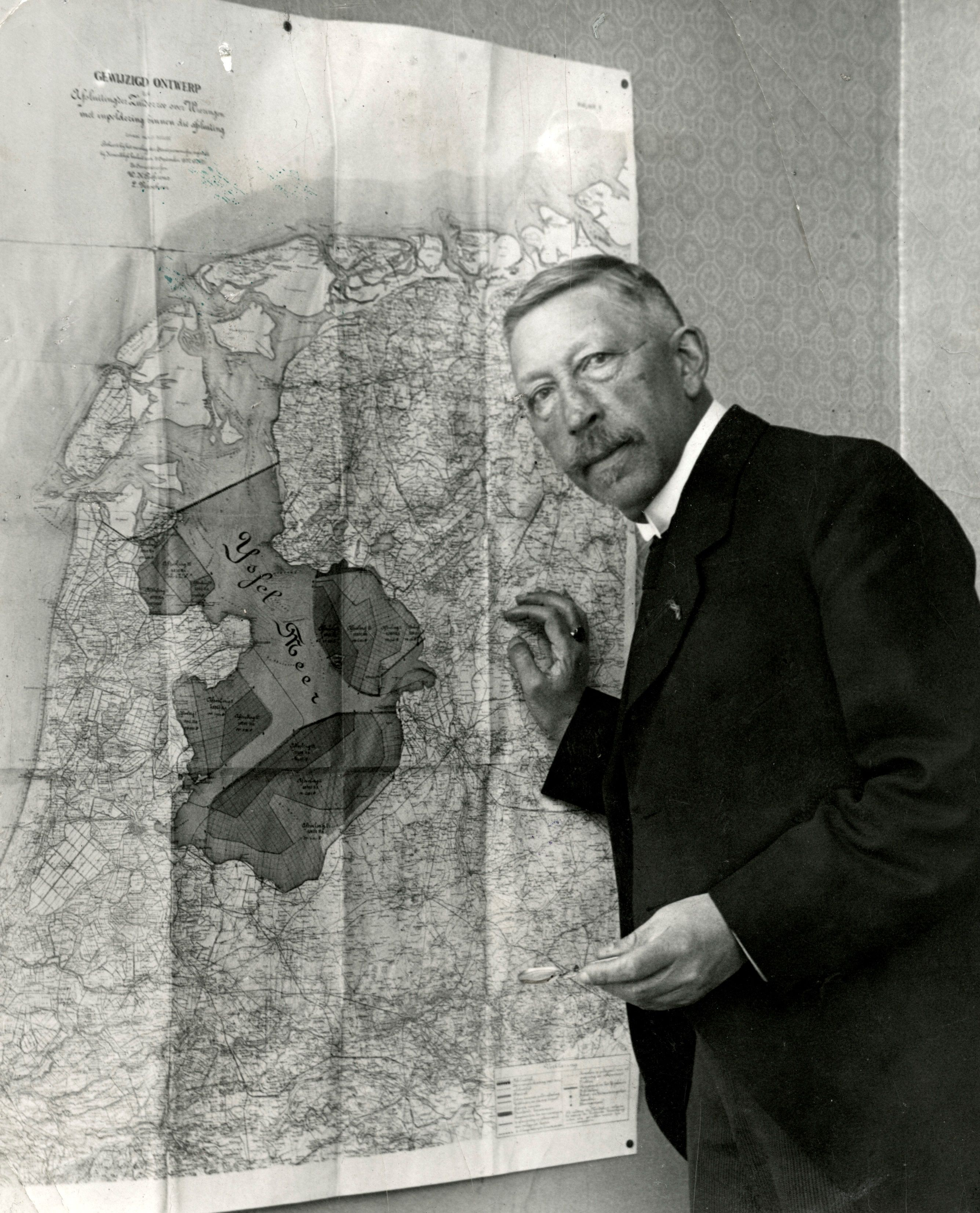
- Wortman in 1920
- Born: 25 March 1859; Amersfoort, Utrecht, Netherlands
- Died: 21 October 1939 (aged 80); The Hague, Netherlands
- Occupation: Civil engineer

Hendrik Wortman (25 March 1859 – 21 October 1939) was a Dutch civil engineer. Born in Amersfoort, Utrecht, he graduated from Delft Polytechnic in 1880 and joined the Rijkswaterstaat. He took offices throughout the country, focusing particularly on questions of water management and hydraulic engineering, until he was seconded to the Ministry of Public Works, Trade, and Industry in 1894. In this capacity, he developed several infrastructure projects, including a harbour in Scheveningen, while preparing exploratory studies for damming of the Zuiderzee.

After Queen Wilhelmina of the Netherlands gave royal assent to the Zuiderzee Works, in 1919 Wortman was appointed as the director general of the Zuiderzee Works Service. Wortman thus designed several aspects of the project as he oversaw its initial stages, including early work on the Afsluitdijk. For his contributions, Wortman was appointed to the Orders of the Netherlands Lion and Orange-Nassau. The H. Wortman Pumping Station in Lelystad is named after him.

== Early life ==
Wortman was born in Amersfoort, Utrecht, the Netherlands, on 25 March 1859. He completed his studies through the HBS (secondary) level, graduating in 1876. He then took civil engineering at the Delft Polytechnic (now the Delft University of Technology). While still a student, he enrolled with the Royal Institute of Engineers (KIVI) in 1878; after graduating in 1880, he also became involved with the Engineers Association of Delft. By the time of his graduation, Wortman was involved in the First Precise Levelling Project.

== Rijkswaterstaat ==
Wortman completed his entrance examination for the Rijkswaterstaat in 1881, being appointed an "aspiring engineer" in the General Service on 15 November of that year. In this capacity, he observed the drawing of maps for water management, including polders and dykes. This provided him with insight into the overall water management situation of the Netherlands. He remained in this capacity until 1887, when he was made an engineer, third-class, and sent to Dordrecht. After this, he took numerous short-term assignments, taking him to Zwolle, Terneuzen, and Assen.

In August 1889, Wortman was assigned to Drenthe, where he stayed for several years. Having previously argued in favour of peatland exploitation, including the use of peat as a construction material, he oversaw several peat engineering projects. Wortman's portfolio in Drenthe also included the rivers and national roads in the area, as well as the Drentsche Hoofdvaart and the region's steam-powered pumping stations. He was made an engineer, second class, in 1891.

Wortman was seconded in July 1894 to the Ministry of Public Works, Trade, and Industry, where he was tasked with preparing for several infrastructure projects. With contributions from Wortman, in 1907 a bill was passed to allow for the partial drainage of the Zuiderzee, construction of the Amsteldiepdijk, and drainage of the Wieringermeer. He also served on a state commission for the management of water pollution, travelling to France, Germany, and the United Kingdom to survey existing measures. The commission's report was published in 1901, and through his involvement Wortman ultimately spent two decades as an extraordinary member of the national health council. Also in 1901 he was made engineer, first class.

His work sometimes took him into the field; for instance, in 1902 he supervised the completion of a railway bridge over the Oude Maas near Spijkenisse following the death of its original engineer, M. Henket. He also led a committee that designed a fishing harbour for Scheveningen, with the outer harbour constructed by the national government and the inner harbour handled by the Hague. Outside of the ministry, Wortman served two terms on the KIVI board of directors. He frequently delivered lectures with the association, with topics including peat construction and hydraulic engineering. Several of his lectures were subsequently published in De Ingenieur.

In October 1903, Wortman was sent to North Holland. He began expanding and electrifying the North Sea Canal, improving the local waterways, and building locks. In Velsen, he installed cable ferries. Within five years, in August 1908, he was made the director of the local Rijkswaterstaat office. Sited in Haarlem and made chief engineer, second class, he became responsible for the various ports, islands, and sea defences in the area.

By the 1910s, the Rijkswaterstaat was preparing for the Zuiderzee Works. Several governments had sought to pass legislation that would allow the damming of the Zuiderzee, and to ensure the feasibility of the task, extensive preparatory work was required. Under Wortman's supervision, Victor de Blocq van Kuffeler surveyed the inlets between the Wadden Islands. Two years later, Wortman was appointed by Minister of Water Management Cornelis Lely as the chairman of a committee tasked with developing a new budget for the project. Wortman was made chief engineer-director, first class, in 1912.

Three years later, in August 1915, Wortman was appointed one of two inspectors general of the Rijkswaterstaat. He was responsible for the northwestern Netherlands, while fellow inspector general Johan Christoffel Ramaer had a different area of authority. Wortman took membership in several committees, including ones that sought to improve the Amsterdam–Rhine Canal, connect the coal mines of South Limburg with ports along the Meuse, and improve the seaport at Delfzijl.

== Zuiderzee Works ==
In June 1918, Queen Wilhelmina of the Netherlands signed into law an act allowing the damming of the Zuiderzee. Minister Lely appointed Wortman to a commission, headed by Hendrik Lorentz, to examine the potential consequences of the project on sea levels. Wortman drew on previous studies, including those of de Blocq van Kuffeler, to provide the necessary information. He also chaired a supervisory committee.

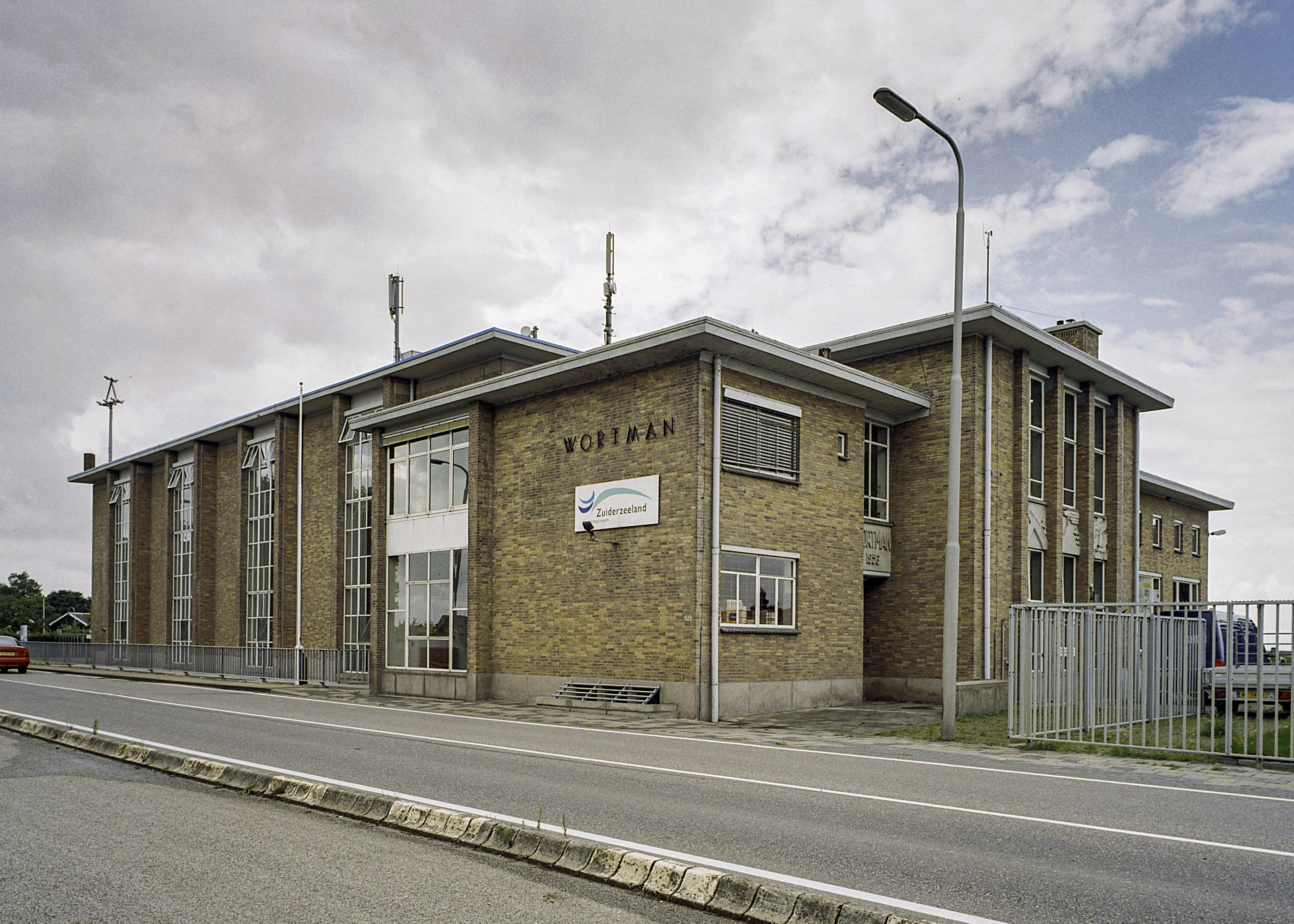
The H. Wortman Pumping Station

On 1 May 1919, Wortman was appointed Director General of the Zuiderzee Works Service. On indefinite leave from the Rijkswaterstaat, Wortman was directly responsible to the Minister of Water Management. In this capacity, he wrote extensively about the project's potential benefits to the Netherlands and made numerous proposals about the ultimate shape of the finished project. He was a strong advocate for using the new polders for agriculture, concurring with Hermanus Johannes Lovink that the country required agrarian land to ensure its self-sufficiency. Among the major projects undertaken during this period was the construction of the Afsluitdijk, which began in 1927. Wortman retired on 1 May 1929, and was succeeded by Victor de Blocq van Kuffeler.

After his retirement, Wortman wrote extensively on engineering subjects. He was also a member of the Zuiderzee Council, serving as its chair from 1933, and dealt extensively with questions of hydraulic engineering and the reclamation of the Wieringermeer. In 1929, Wortman was appointed to the International Advisory Committee on the Suez Canal Works, replacing Lely. He died in the Hague on 21 October 1939.

== Legacy ==
Wortman received an honorary doctorate degree from the Karlsruhe Institute of Technology in 1926. He was a knight in the Order of the Netherlands Lion, as well as an officer in the Order of Orange-Nassau. In 1956, the H. Wortman Pumping Station began operations in Lelystad. This four-pump station, designed by Dirk Roosenburg, was used with the Colijn Pumping Station in Ketelhaven and the H. J. Lovink Pumping Station in Biddinghuizen to reclaim the eastern Flevopolder.

== Works cited ==
- Blocq van Kuffeler, Victor de (24 November 1939). "Ter Herdenking: Dr. Ir. H. Wortman, 1859 — 1939" [In Memoriam: Dr. Ir. H. Wortman, 1859 — 1939]. De Ingenieur (in Dutch). Vol. 54, no. 47. pp. 443–444.
- "Dr. Ing. Ir. H. Wortman". De Ingenieur (in Dutch). Vol. 44, no. 11. 11 March 1929. pp. 93–95.
- "Dr. Ir. H. Wortman †". Twentsch Dagblad Tubantia en Enschedesche Courant (in Dutch). Enschede. 23 October 1939. p. 6.
- "Gemaal Lovink" [Lovink Pumping Station] (in Dutch). Zuiderzeeland Water Authority. 26 May 2020. Archived from the original on 8 June 2024.
- Horn-van Nispen, Marie-Louise ten (2004). "Hendrik Wortman". Tijdschrift voor Waterstaatsgeschiedenis. 13 (2). Vereniging voor Waterstaatsgeschiedenis: 60–68.
- "Ir. Dr. H. Wortman". De Locomotief (in Dutch). Semarang. 16 October 1929. p. 1.
- "Wortman" (in Dutch). Netherlands Pumping Station Foundation. Archived from the original on 9 June 2024.
