= Lovink =

Lovink is a surname found in the Netherlands. Notable people with this surname include:

- Geert Lovink (born 1959), a Dutch media academic
- Hermanus Johannes Lovink (1866 – 1938), a Dutch agriculturalist, horticulturalist, and politician
- Tony Lovink (1902 – 1995), a Dutch diplomat

== See also ==
- H. J. Lovink Pumping Station, a pumping station in Dronten, the Netherlands
- Loving (disambiguation)
