= List of Rijksmonuments in Flevoland =

This is a list of notable Rijksmonuments in Flevoland. They are listed by municipality.

== Almere ==
Rijksmonument	Type	Location	Description	Photo
Archaeological site	Archaeological monument	Almere Hout	Field with traces of early-Neolithic habitation	
Archaeological site	Archaeological monument	Almere Hout	Field with traces of early-Neolithic habitation	
Archaeological site	Archaeological monument	Almere Hout	Field with traces of early-Neolithic habitation	
Archaeological site	Archaeological monument	Almere Hout	Field with traces of early-Neolithic habitation	
Het Kalkschip	Archaeological monument	Almere Poort	Shipwreck of a 17th-century cargo ship	
De Visbun	Archaeological monument	Almere Stad	Shipwreck of a 16th-century fishing boat	
De Zuiderzeeparel	Archaeological monument	Almere Pampus	Shipwreck of a 15th-century cargo boat	
De Tjalk	Archaeological monument	Almere Pampus	Shipwreck of an 18th-century cargo boat	
De Ravage	Archaeological monument	Almere Poort	Shipwreck of a 17th-century cargo ship	
De Slagzij	Archaeological monument	Almere Poort	Shipwreck of a 17th-century cargo ship	
De Werkschuit	Archaeological monument	Almere Buiten	Shipwreck of a 19th-century working ship	
De Molensteen	Archaeological monument	Almere Buiten	Shipwreck of a 16th-century or 17th-century cargo ship	
Hanzeschip	Archaeological monument	Almere Stad	Shipwreck of a 16th-century cargo ship	
De Branding	Archaeological monument	Almere Hout	Shipwreck of a 16th-century fishing boat	
Visserijoorlog	Archaeological monument	Almere Hout	Shipwreck of a 16th-century fishing boat	

== Dronten ==
Rijksmonument	Type	Location	Description	Photo
Gemaal Lovink	Monument	Dronten	Pumping station	

== Lelystad ==
Rijksmonument	Type	Location	Description	Photo
Ship Wreck VAL1460	Archaeological monument	Lelystad	Shipwreck of a late Medieval freighter	

== Noordoostpolder ==
- See List of Rijksmonuments in Noordoostpolder

== Urk ==
- See List of Rijksmonuments in Urk

== Zeewolde ==
Rijksmonument	Type	Location	Description	Photo
Archaeological site	Archaeological monument	Zeewolde	Field with traces of early-Neolithic habitation	
