= Andries Cornelis Dirk de Graeff =

Governor-General of the Dutch East Indies

His Excellency, Jonkheer Andries Cornelis Dirk de Graeff
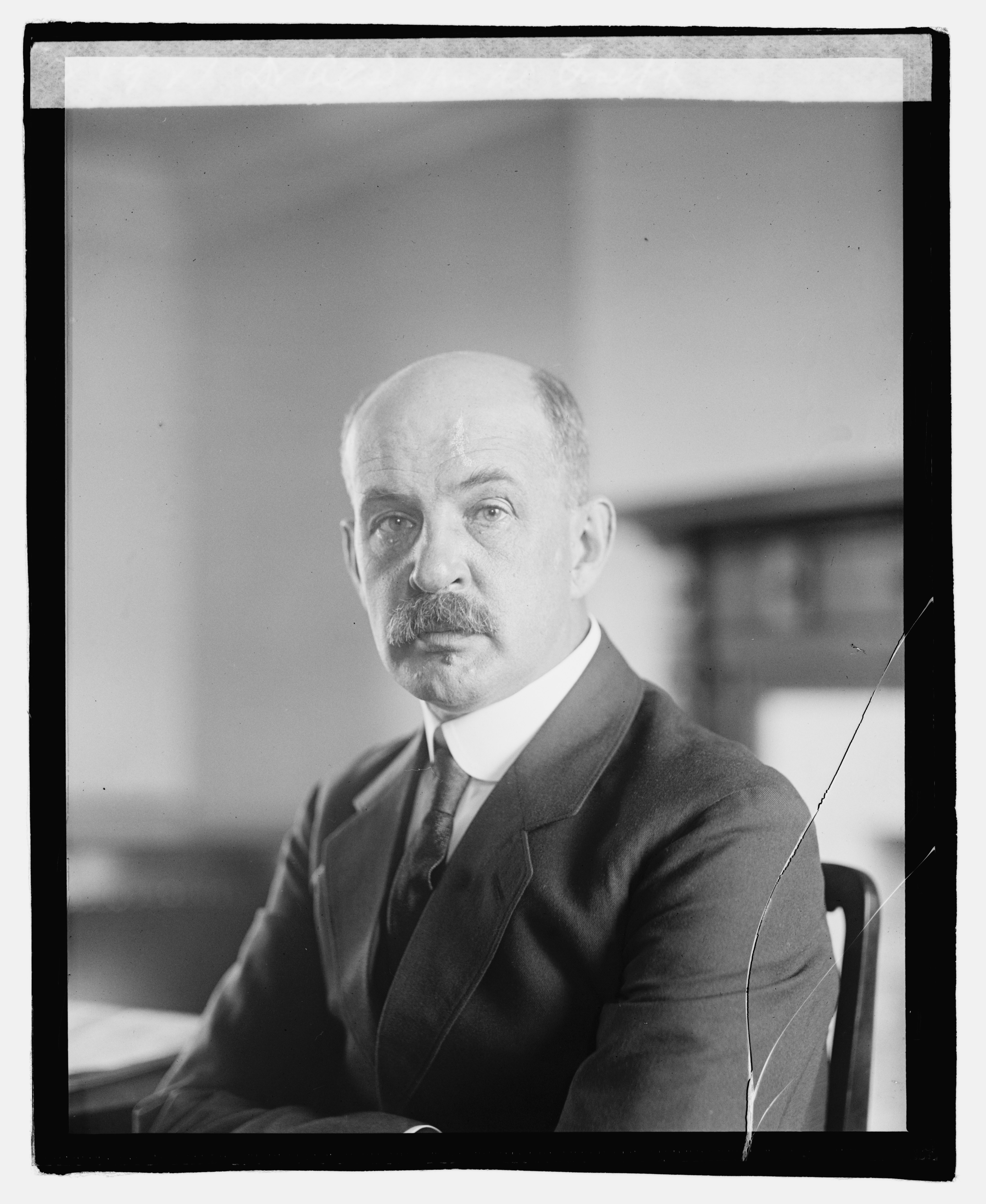
- Dirk de Graeff in 1922

Governor-General of the Dutch East Indies
- In office 26 March 1926 – 11 September 1931
- Monarch: Wilhelmina
- Preceded by: Dirk Fock
- Succeeded by: Bonifacius Cornelis de Jonge

Minister of Foreign Affairs
- In office 26 May 1933 – 24 June 1937
- Preceded by: Charles Ruijs de Beerenbrouck
- Succeeded by: Hendrikus Colijn

Personal details
- Born: 7 August 1872 The Hague, Netherlands
- Died: 24 April 1957 (aged 84) The Hague, Netherlands
- Spouse: Caroline van der Wijck (m. 1877–1936)

Jhr. Andries Cornelis Dirk de Graeff (7 August 1872 – 24 April 1957) was a governor-general of the Dutch East Indies and a Dutch minister for foreign affairs.

== Family ==
Coat of arms De Graeff (1885 creation)

Andries Cornelis Dirk de Graeff was a descendant of the De Graeff-family from the Dutch Golden Age. He was a son of the general consul and Dutch minister in Japan Dirk de Graeff van Polsbroek, and Bonne Elisabeth Royer. De Graeff married jonkvrouw Caroline Angelique van der Wijck, daughter of jonkheer Carel Herman Aart van der Wijck, Governor-General of the Dutch East Indies. They had seven children; a grandson of his is Jan Jaap de Graeff.

== Career ==
De Graeff was an unorthodox man of a Remonstrant background, who was mistakenly assumed to be a CHU sympathizer. Between 1890 and 1895, he studied law at Leiden University, where he met his friends for life, Johan Paul Count of Limburg Stirum and Jhr. Frans Beelaerts van Blokland, and then moved to the Dutch East Indies. De Graeff became secretary official and general secretary of the governor-general Alexander Willem Frederik Idenburg. In 1914 he became a member, and in the beginning of 1917 vice president of the Council of the Dutch East Indies.

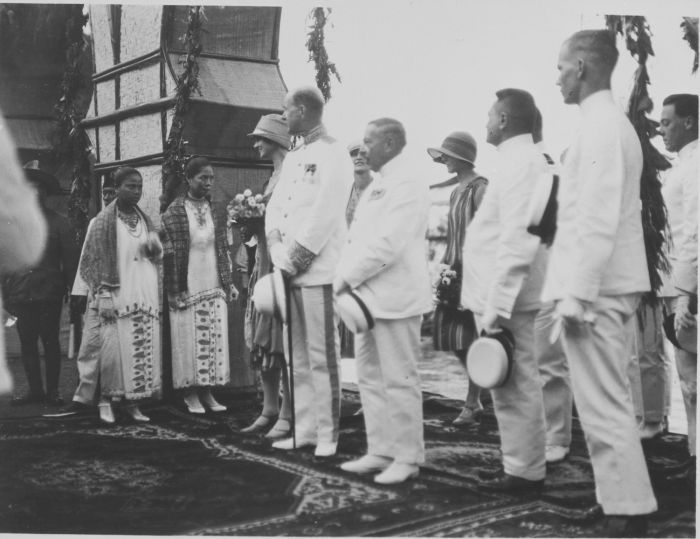
De Graeff as Governor-General of Dutch East Indies. Gorontalo, ca. 1927.

After his East Indies stint, de Graeff became envoy in Tokyo (1919-1922) and in Washington (1922-1926), and was governor-general of the Dutch East Indies from 1926–1931. There, de Graeff tried in vain to conduct an ethical regime that catered to moderate nationalists.

De Graeff was also the Dutch minister for foreign affairs for an unspecified period during 1936 and 1937. During De Graeff's term as Foreign Minister, the Netherlands returned to pure neutrality. Throughout 1936, de Graeff served as a "sort of stooge" to British Foreign Secretary Anthony Eden in relation to the question of weakening the League of Nations.

De Graeff wanted to modify the League until it became "purely consultative", coax Germany back into it, and abolish forever all sanctions "except the one Sanction that an aggressor would be automatically expelled from the League."

== Honours ==
Andries Cornelis Dirk de Graeff received various honours:

- Officer in the Order of Orange-Nassau, August 31, 1909
- Knight in the Order of the Netherlands Lion, 30 August 1913
- Commander of the Order of the Netherlands Lion, 29 April 1930
- Bearer of the Grand Cross Order of Oranje-Nassau, 10 September 1931
- Grand Cross of the Order of the White Lion, 29 April 1937

== Notes ==
Political offices
Preceded by Dirk Fock	Governor-General of the Dutch East Indies; 1926–1931	Succeeded by Bonifacius Cornelis de Jonge
