= Hermanus Johannes Lovink =

Dutch agriculturist, horticulturist and politician (1866–1938)

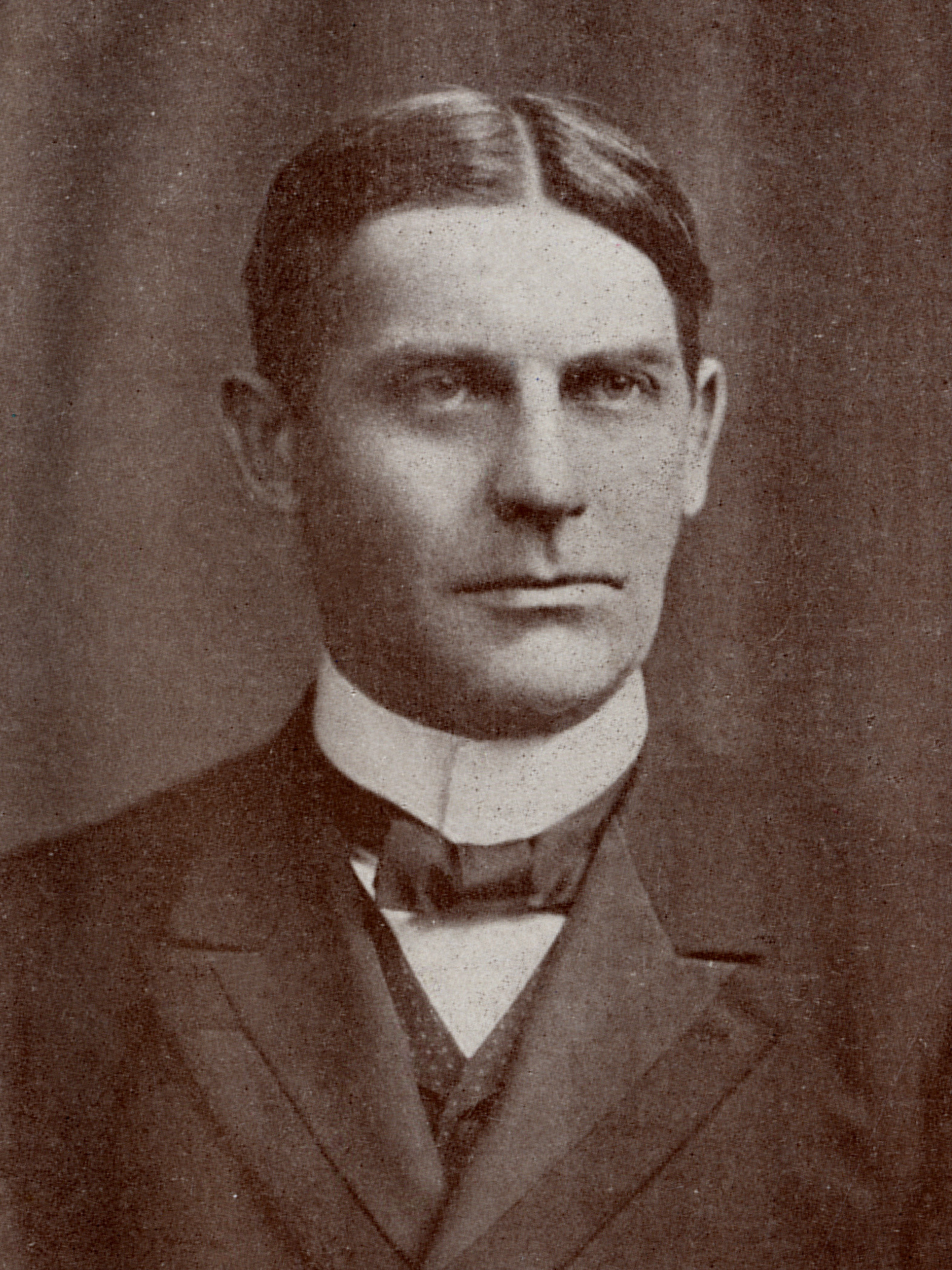
- Lovink, 1908
- Born: 10 January 1866; Terborg, Gelderland, Netherlands
- Died: 2 April 1938 (aged 72); The Hague, Netherlands
- Occupations: Agriculturist, horticulturist, politician
- Children: 4, including Tony Lovink

Member of the House of Representatives of the Netherlands
- In office 7 November 1922 – 8 June 1937

Mayor of Alphen aan den Rijn
- In office 1 May 1923 – 1 September 1933

Personal details
- Party: Christian Historical Union

Signature
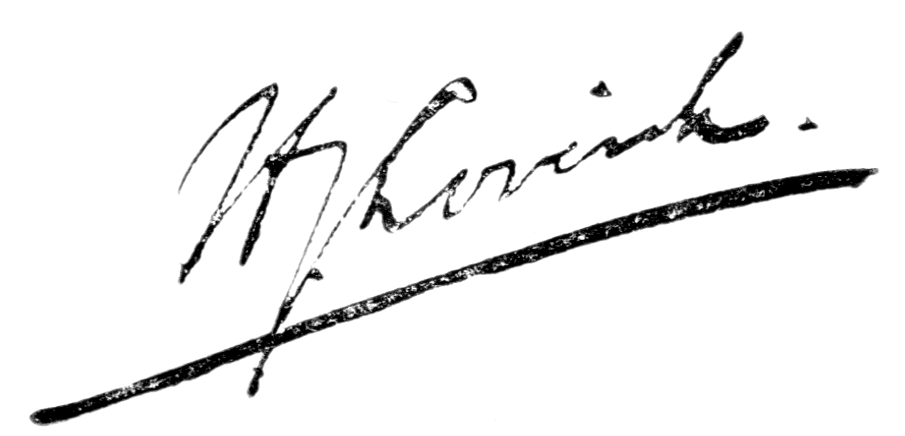

Hermanus Johannes Lovink (10 January 1866 – 2 April 1938) was a Dutch agriculturist, horticulturist, and politician. The son of a gardener, Lovink took to agriculture and horticulture from a young age, becoming the supervisor of public lands in Zutphen in 1887. Building on this experience, he gained a leadership position with the Association for Wasteland Redevelopment, in which capacity he oversaw several land reclamation projects. After being appointed Director General of Agriculture by Johannes Christiaan de Marez Oyens in 1901, he expanded agricultural education and promoted agricultural expansion; he continued these programs in the Dutch East Indies after being made Director of the Department of Agriculture, Industry, and Trade by Alexander Idenburg in 1909.

Returning to the Netherlands in 1918 after a bout of ill health, Lovink turned to politics. As a member of the Christian Historical Union, he was elected to the House of Representatives on 7 November 1922; he served there for almost fifteen years and chaired several committees – including one that assessed the costs and benefits of the ongoing Zuiderzee Works. Concurrently, Lovink spent a decade as the mayor of Alphen aan den Rijn. He was also a member of the Dutch Horticultural Council and the Board of Trustees of the Agricultural and Forestry College in Wageningen.

Lovink, who was primarily self-taught, was recognized with two honorary doctorate degrees as well as membership in the Orders of the Netherlands Lion and the Orange-Nassau. He has lent his name to a wheat variety, several streets, as well as the H. J. Lovink Pumping Station. His son Tony Lovink was the last High Commissioner of the Crown in the Dutch East Indies.

== Life ==
=== Early life ===
Lovink was born in Terborg, Gelderland, Netherlands, on 10 January 1866, to the gardener Hendrik Willem Lovink and his wife Johanna Hendrika Mulder. His initial schooling was completed in Terborg, but after several years he was transferred to a French-language school in Anholt, Germany. At the age of 16, Lovink began working at a tree nursery in Velp, an apprentice to J. Copijn. He dedicated himself to extensive self-study, and in 1887 was made the supervisor of public lands in Zutphen. In this role he continued to study, consulting teachers at the local Hogere Burgerschool as well as professors from Wageningen and Utrecht.

On the recommendation of Mayor Hendrikus Albertus Diedericus Coenen, Lovink was made a deputy director of the Association for Wasteland Redevelopment in 1891; he was appointed director in 1892. He oversaw a period of growth, developing a larger German-trained workforce and bringing the association to greater prominence through a series of public lectures. As time passed, he promoted soil enrichment and the development of grasslands in conjunction with the existing afforestation program. Under Lovink's leadership, the association worked on reclaiming the Peel, captured drifting sands near Kootwijk, and afforested areas near Schoorl and Texel.

== Government activities ==
Recognized for his expertise in land reclamation and monoculture, Lovink was made an inspector of forests with the Staatsbosbeheer when it was established in 1899. He continued his studies, briefly attending the University of Tübingen in the hopes of earning his doctorate. There, he made the acquaintance of Minister Johannes Christiaan de Marez Oyens, who in 1901 appointed Lovink the Director General of Agriculture, replacing Cornelis Jacob Sickesz. At the same time, responsibility for the directorate – previously under the Ministry of the Interior – was taken by Marez Oyens' Ministry of Public Works, Trade, and Industry.

In this capacity, Lovink reorganized the Agricultural and Forestry College in Wageningen in 1904. Renamed the State Higher School for Agriculture, Horticulture, and Forestry, the school began offering the courses necessary for graduates to obtain their teaching certificates. Lovink also developed plans to expand agricultural education, established the National Serum Institute in Rotterdam, made mandatory the inspection of exported meat, stabilized the National Veterinary School, and co-founded the Dutch Horticultural Council. For his emphasis on applied agriculture, Lovink was opposed by many university-trained biologists.

Lovink remained in this position until 1909, when he was appointed by Governor-General Alexander Idenburg to replace Melchior Treub as the Director of the Department of Agriculture, Industry, and Trade of the Dutch East Indies. Critical of earlier efforts that prioritized native rice agriculture, Lovink instead sought to promote agricultural expansion by applying agronomy to improve production techniques. He also initiated forestry programmes and established the Institute for Plant Diseases and Cultures. Lovink entrusted elements without economic import, including the Lands Plantentuin in Buitenzorg (now the Bogor Botanical Gardens in Bogor), to Jacob Christiaan Koningsberger; the latter served as acting director when Lovink took sick leave between 1915 and 1916.

Citing health concerns, Lovink left the Indies in 1918, with his position as director taken by J. Sibinga Mulder. On his return to the Netherlands, he was made the Commissioner for Agricultural Production, effective 3 October.

== Political career and death ==
A sketch of Lovink, 1926

Lovink was elected to the House of Representatives on 7 November 1922. A member of the Dutch Reformed Church, Lovink represented the Christian Historical Union. He led a commission tasked with a cost-benefit evaluation of the Zuiderzee Works, concluding in a 1924 report that the project would have greater benefits than anticipated. He also sat on committees that examined import duties and land reclamation. He remained a member of the House, serving as his party's spokesman on agricultural issues, until 8 June 1937.

Between 1 May 1923 and 1 September 1933, concurrently with his membership in the House of Representatives, Lovink served as the mayor of Alphen aan den Rijn. Due to his dual position, members of the municipal council proposed reducing his salary by one guilder; this proposal was rejected. During this period, he spent three days a week in The Hague. As mayor, he delivered several lectures on music – one of his favourite pastimes – accompanied by his suitcase gramophone.

Outside of parliament and his mayorship, Lovink was involved in numerous organizations. In 1927, Lovink was elected the chairman of the Dutch Agricultural Society. He was also a member of the board of trustees of the Agricultural College and the Fishery Council and remained involved with the Dutch Horticultural Council and the Association for Wasteland Redevelopment.

Lovink died in The Hague on 2 April 1938 at the age of 72. He was buried in Alphen aan den Rijn four days later, following a funerary procession attended by thousands. Present at the funeral were the royal forester W. Brants, Minister of the Interior Hendrik van Boeijen, and Minister of Education Jan Rudolph Slotemaker de Bruïne. Prayers were led by Lovink's son, Reverend Hendrik Willem Lovink.

== Family ==
Lovink married Leida Aalders, whom he met at a music club in her native Zutphen, on 27 September 1893; she died on 25 March 1925. The couple had four children, two sons and two daughters. Lovink's elder son, Hendrik, was a preacher. His younger son, Tony, served as the High Commissioner of the Crown in the Dutch East Indies; he was the last person to occupy this colonial role before it was abolished following the Netherlands' recognition of Indonesian independence. He later became the Dutch ambassador to Australia and Canada.

== Honours ==
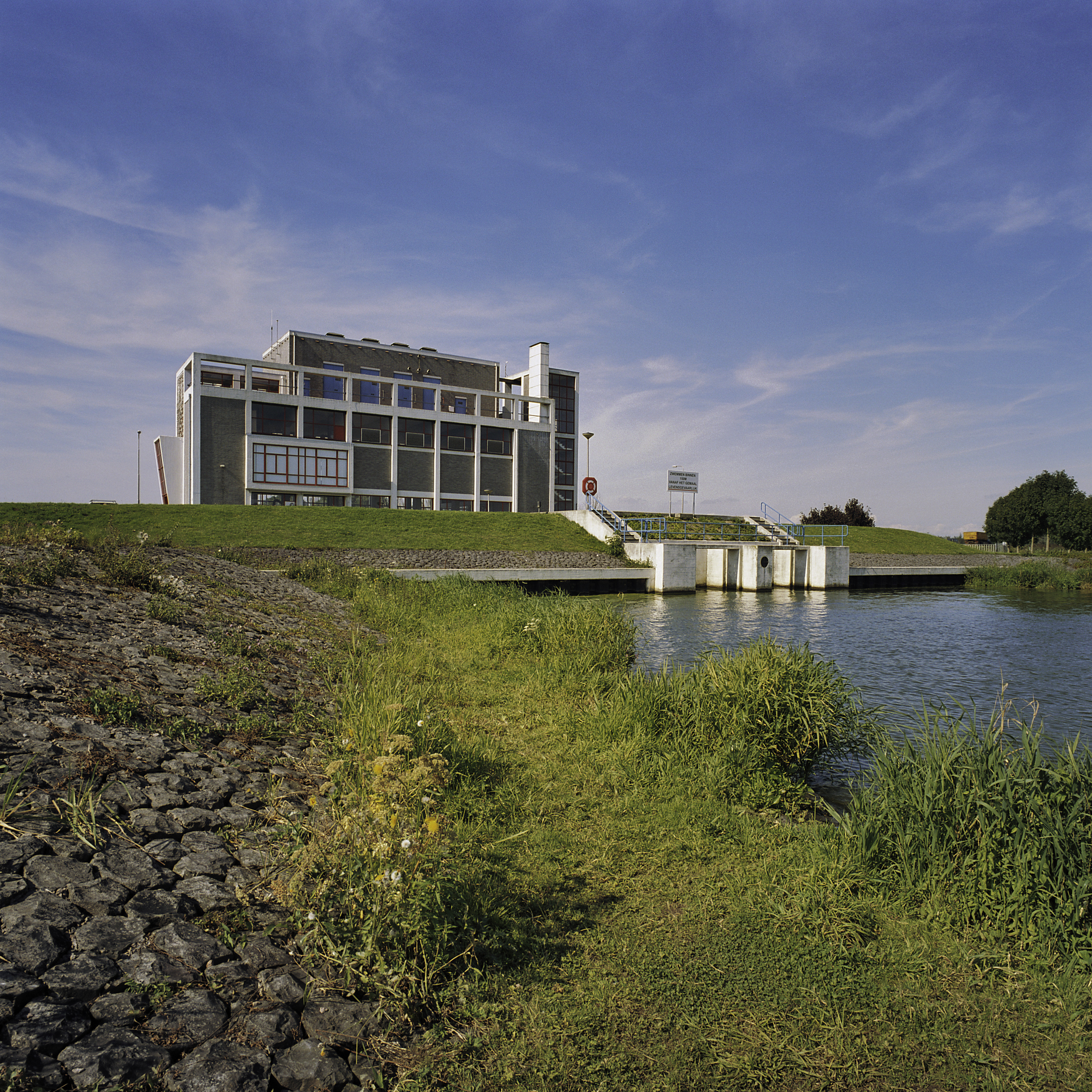
The H. J. Lovink Pumping Station in Dronten

Lovink received an honorary doctorate degree in political science from the University of Groningen in 1914. Four years later, he received another degree from the National Agricultural College (formerly the Agricultural and Forestry College) in Wageningen. Lovink was appointed a Knight in the Order of the Netherlands Lion, as well as a Commander in the Order of Orange-Nassau. He was also a member of the Order of Leopold and the Legion of Honour.

On 6 September 1941, a bust of Lovink by Gra Rueb was unveiled. Commissioned in 1940 with funds collected by a committee led by J. C. A. M. van de Mortel, the 3.3-metre (11 ft) monument is located in front of the Association for Wasteland Redevelopment Building in Arnhem. A portrait of Lovink, completed by Jan Sluyters, is also located in this building.

The namesake H. J. Lovink Pumping Station, designed by the architect Dirk Roosenburg, began operation in Dronten in September 1956. Together with the accompanying Lovink Lock, the station was used in the reclamation of the eastern Flevopolder. The pumping station was made a rijksmonument on 13 December 2010 due to its architectural and historical significance. Other namesakes include a wheat variety and an experimental farm in the IJsselmeer Polders, as well as several streets.

== Works cited ==
- "A.H.J. (Tony) Lovink" (in Dutch). Parlementair Documentatie Centrum. Archived from the original on 13 December 2014.
- Bergsma, Emmy (25 July 2018). From Flood Safety to Spatial Management: Expert-Policy Interactions in Dutch and US Flood Governance. Springer. ISBN 978-3-319-96716-5.
- "Buste dr. H.J. Lovink" [Bust of Dr. H.J. Lovink]. Collectie Gelderland (in Dutch). Gelderland Heritage.
- "Dr. H.J. Lovink" (in Dutch). Parlementair Documentatie Centrum. Archived from the original on 8 June 2024.
- "Dr. H. J. Lovink". Provinciale Overijsselsche en Zwolsche courant (in Dutch). Zwolle. 2 April 1938. p. 1.
- "Dr. H. J. Lovink †". Nieuwe Tilburgsche Courant (in Dutch). Tilburg. 4 April 1938. p. 11.
- "Een kranige achterhoeker" [A Spirited Achterhoeker]. De Graafschap-bode (in Dutch). Doetinchem. 16 September 1927. p. 1.
- "Familiebericht" [Family News]. Leeuwarder Courant (in Dutch). Leeuwarder. 2 April 1938. p. 6.
- "Gemaal H.J. Lovink" [H.J. Lovink Pumping Station]. Rijksmonumentenregister (in Dutch). Ministry of Education, Culture and Science. Archived from the original on 10 December 2023.
- Goss, Andrew (2009). "Decent Colonialism? Pure Science and Colonial Ideology in the Netherlands East Indies, 1910–1929". Journal of Southeast Asian Studies. 40 (1): 187–214. doi:10.1017/S002246340900006X. JSTOR 27751556.
- "H.J. Lovink". grarueb.nl (in Dutch). Archived from the original on 30 September 2023.
- Maat, H. (2013). Science Cultivating Practice: A History of Agricultural Science in the Netherlands and its Colonies, 1863–1986. Springer. ISBN 978-94-017-2954-3.
- "Nederlandse Tuinbouwraad te Den Haag: 1908" [Dutch Horticultural Council in the Hague: 1908]. Actorenregister (in Dutch). Nationaal Archief. hdl:10648/8d795d3d-ad4d-4232-915e-1004e40f775a. Archived from the original on 25 July 2019.
- Oosthoek, K. Jan (2018). "State Forestry in the Netherlands: From Liberalism to Nature Creation". In Oosthoek, K. Jan; Hölzl, Richard (eds.). Managing Northern Europe's Forests: Histories from the Age of Improvement to the Age of Ecology. Berghahn Books. pp. 66–91. ISBN 978-1-78533-601-0.
- Poel, JMG van der (12 November 2013). "Lovink, Hermanus Johannes (1866–1938)" (in Dutch). Huygens Institute for the History of the Netherlands. Archived from the original on 8 June 2024.
- "(untitled)". Zutphensche Courant (in Dutch). Zutphen. 26 March 1925. p. 3.
- "Uitvaart Dr. H. J. Lovink" [Funeral of Dr. H. J. Lovink]. Het nieuws van den dag voor Nederlandsch-Indië (in Dutch). Batavia. 8 April 1938. p. 2.
