= Dirk Fock =

Dutch politician and diplomat (1858–1941)

His Excellency Dirk Fock
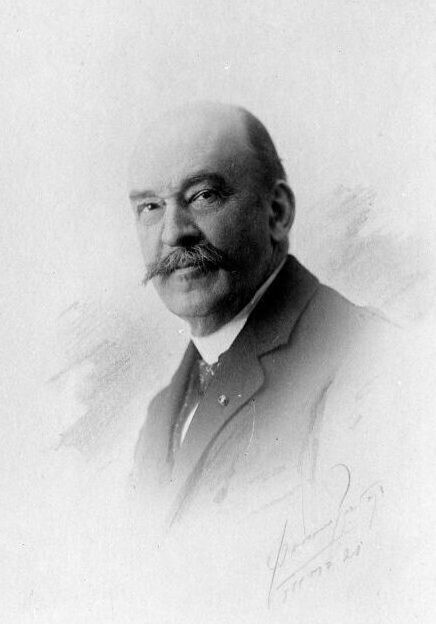
- Dirk Fock in 1921

Parliamentary Leader in the Senate
- In office 1932–1935

Governor-General of the Dutch East Indies
- In office 24 March 1921 – 6 September 1926
- Monarch: Wilhelmina
- Preceded by: Johan van Limburg Stirum
- Succeeded by: Andries Dirk de Graeff

Speaker of the House of Representatives
- In office 25 January 1917 – 8 October 1920
- Preceded by: Hendrik Borgesius
- Succeeded by: Dionysius Koolen

Governor-General of Suriname
- In office 10 August 1908 – 30 June 1911
- Monarch: Wilhelmina
- Preceded by: Pieter Crull (ad interim)
- Succeeded by: Louis Couquerque

Minister of Colonial Affairs
- In office 17 August 1905 – 12 February 1908
- Prime Minister: Theo de Meester
- Preceded by: Alexander Idenburg
- Succeeded by: Theo Heemskerk (ad interim)

Personal details
- Born: 19 June 1858 Wijk bij Duurstede, Netherlands
- Died: 17 October 1941 (aged 83) The Hague, Netherlands
- Party: Liberal State Party
- Other political affiliations: Liberal Union (1885–1921)
- Spouses: Wilhelmina Doffegnies (m. 1881; died 1913) Alida Diemont (m. 1926; died 1931)

Dirk Fock (19 June 1858 – 17 October 1941) was a Dutch politician and diplomat of the defunct Liberal State Party (LSP) now merged into the People's Party for Freedom and Democracy (VVD). He served as Governor of Suriname (1908–1911), Speaker of the House of Representatives (1917–1921) and Governor-General of the Dutch East Indies (1921–1926).

== Biography ==
Fock was born on 19 June 1858 in Wijk bij Duurstede as child of Maria Anna Uittenhooven (1830-1909) and Cornelis Fock (1828-1910), from the known Fock-dynasty. After attending Gymnasium Haganum, Fock studied law at Leiden University from 1875 to 1880. After graduating, Fock went to the Dutch East Indies (now: Indonesia) where he worked as a lawyer and prosecutor in Batavia until 1898. He did marry there in 1881 to Wilhelmina Doffegnies, who gave birth to five children, among them the later renowned music director Dirk Fock (or Dick Foch), father of American actress Nina Foch.

In 1899, the family returned to the Netherlands and Fock started practising law in Rotterdam. On 17 September 1901, he was first elected to the States General of the Netherlands for the Liberal State Party. On 17 August 1905, he was appointed Minister of Colonial Affairs in the De Meester cabinet. During his tenure, he enhanced and extended education in the colonies, and served until 12 February 1908.

On 10 Augustus 1908, Fock was appointed Governor-General of Suriname. During his tenure, he tried to stimulate the economy by developing the banana industry. There was increased immigration of indentured workers from British India and Java. Plans to further develop the healthcare and educational system were blocked by the States General. He served until 1 July 1911.

In 1913 his wife died. In the same year Fock was re-elected to the States General, and became the Speaker of the House of Representatives in 1917. In 1916 Fock married for the second time with Alida Diemont.

On 3 April 1919, he temporarily resigned from the States General, after Governor van Limburg Stirum of the Dutch East Indies pleaded for radical changes in the colony which was at odds with Fock's view of a gentle evolution. On 14 October 1920, he permanently resigned.

On 24 March 1921, Fock was appointed Governor-General of the Dutch East Indies succeeding his former adversary van Limburg Stirum. He arrived in the colony during a severe financial crisis, and the books were finally balanced in 1925. In 1923, he passed article 161bis of the Criminal Law, which criminalised incitements of strikes. In 1925, he passed the Wet op de Staatsinrichting (Constitutional Act) which allowed the Dutch East Indies to pass internal legislation without the approval of the States General. He served until 6 September 1926.

On 17 September 1929, Fock was elected to the Senate, and became Parliamentary leader on 20 September 1932. He retired on 17 September 1935. In 1930, he was a member of the Dutch delegation to the League of Nations and in 1931, he was in charge of creating the Dutch pavilion of the Paris Colonial Exposition.

Fock died on 17 October 1941 in The Hague, at the age of 83.

== Honours ==
- Netherlands Knight Grand Cross of the Order of the Netherlands Lion.
- France Knight Grand Cross of the Legion of Honour.
- Belgium Knight Grass Cross of the Order of the Crown.

Political offices
| Preceded by Johan Paul van Limburg Stirum | Governor-General of the Dutch East Indies; 1921–1926 | Succeeded by Andries Cornelis Dirk de Graeff |
| Preceded by Hendrik Goeman Borgesius | Speaker of the House of Representatives; 1913–1917 | Succeeded by Dionysius Koolen |
| Preceded by Alexander Idenburg | Minister of Colonial Affairs; 1905–1908 | Succeeded by Theo Heemskerk (ad interim) |
