= List of Rijksmonuments in Urk =

This is a list of notable Rijksmonuments in Urk.

Rijksmonument	Type	Location	Description	Photo
Building with stucco facade and gable roof	House	District 2 51	19th-century	
Building with stucco facade and gable roof	House	District 2 74	19th-century	
Urk Lighthouse	Lighthouse	Urk	Completed in 1844; designed by architect J. Valk	
Kerkje aan de Zee Clock tower	Clock tower	Quarter 4 1	Clock was completed in 1461	
Kerkje aan de Zee	Dutch Reformed Church	District 3 96	Completed in 1786	
Gable roof house	House	District 4 68	19th-century	
Gable roof house	House	District 4 99	19th-century	
House with stucco facade and gable roof	House	District 5 11	19th-century	
Gable roofed brick house	House	District 5 10	19th-century	
Gable roofed house	House	District 5 26	19th-century	
Gable roofed house	House	District 5 29	19th-century	
House with stucco facade and a gable roof	House	District 5 63	19th-century	
House with stucco facade and a gable roof	House	District 5 64	19th-century	
Gable roof house	House	5th District 84A	19th-century	
Gable roof house	House	Quarter 5116	19th-century	
Gable roof house	House	Quarter 5125	19th-century	
Mansard roof house	House	Quarter 5126	19th-century	
Gable roof house	House	District 6 22	19th-century	
Gable roof house	House	District 6 88	19th-century	
Gemaal Vissering	Pump house	Domineesweg 33e	Completed between 1938 and 1942; designed by Dirk Roosenburg	
Urkersluis	Canal lock	Domineesweg 33F	Completed between 1938 and 1941; designed by Dirk Roosenburg	
Urkersluis Shed	Canal shed	Domineesweg 33F	Completed between 1938 and 1941; designed by Dirk Roosenburg	
Urkersluis Sluiswachter House	Canalwatcher's house	Domineesweg 33F	Completed between 1938 and 1941; designed by Dirk Roosenburg	
Urk old Townhall	old Townhall	District 2 1	Completed between 1904 and 1905; designed by J.F.L. Frowein	
Urk Forge	House	District 2 26	Completed between 1900 and 1915	
Small Urk house	House	District 2 85	Completed in 1850	
Bethelkerk	Church	District 3 3	Completed in 1885	
Bakery/Cobbler	Industry	District 3 28	Completed circa 1880	
Bakery	Industry	District 4 20	Completed between 1929 and 1930	
Eben-Haezerkerk	Church	Quarter 4101	Completed in 1895; designed by Ven Benthem	
Carpenter's house	Industry	District 6 81	Completed circa 1840	
Visserswoning	House	District 2 4	Completed in 1850	
