= List of Rijksmonuments in Noordoostpolder =

This is a list of Rijksmonuments in Noordoostpolder.

== Emmeloord ==
Rijksmonument	Type	Location	Description	Photo
Wooden house	House	Acacialaan 5	1948-1949	
Wooden house	House	Acacialaan 7	1948-1949	
Wooden house	House	Acacialaan 9	1948-1949	
Wooden house	House	Acacialaan 11	1948-1949	
Wooden house	House	Acacialaan 13	1948-1949	
Wooden house	House	Berkenlaan 2	1948	
Wooden house	House	Berkenlaan 4	1948	
Wooden house	House	Berkenlaan 6	1948	
Wooden house	House	Berkenlaan 8	1948	
Wooden house	House	Berkenlaan 10	1948	
Wooden house	House	Berkenlaan 11	1948	
Wooden house	House	Berkenlaan 12	1948	
Reclamation farm	Ranch	Espelerweg 4	1947	
Former office	Trade and offices	Jasmijnstraat 9	1948	
Terraced houses	Houses	Meidoornstraat 1	1947-1948	
Terraced houses	Houses	Meidoornstraat 13	1947-1948	
Terraced houses	Houses	Meidoornstraat 21	1947-1948	
Terraced houses	Houses	Koningin Julianastraat 1	1947-1948	
Terraced houses	Houses	Koningin Julianastraat 13	1947-1948	

== Ens ==
Rijksmonument	Type	Location	Description	Photo
Enserkerk	Church	Middelbuurt 3 Schokland	1834	
Ensenerkerk	Archaeological monument	Ruinepad Schokland	12th-18th century	
Zuidert Mound	Archaeological monument	Ruinepad	14th-19th century	
Middelbuurt Mound	Archaeological monument	Middelbuurt/Ruinepad	14th-20th century	
Mound	Archaeological monument	Vluchthavenpad	14th-19th century	
Field	Archaeological monument	Keileemweg/Oud Emmeloorderweg	Neolithic, Bronze Age and Iron Age	
R.K. Church	Church	Arnoldus van Bockholtstraat 1	1948; designed by A.E. Bleys	
Lighthousekeeper House	Lighthousekeeper house	Oud Emmeloorderweg 25	1890-1900	
Misthoorn Foghornhouse	Lighthousekeeper house	Oud Emmeloorderweg bij 25	circa 1900	
Ice boat barn	Transport	Midddelbuurt 3 Schokland	1850-1860	
Farmhouse	Ranch	Schokkerringweg 43	1943	
Barn	Ranch	Schokkerringweg bij 43	1944	

== Kraggenburg ==
Rijksmonument	Type	Location	Description	Photo
Old Kraggenburg	Lighthouse	Zwartemeerweg 23	1845	
Wieringermeer-type Farm	Ranch	Kadoelerweg 14	1943	
Reclamation Farm	Ranch	Zwartemeerweg 46	1943	
Smeenge Pumphouse	General	Kadoelerweg bij 1	1939-1941; Designed by Dirk Roosenburg	
Canal lock	Canal lock	Kadoelerweg bij 1	1939-1941; Designed by Dirk Roosenburg	
Canalwatcher House	Canal lock	Kadoelerweg bij 1	1939-1941; Designed by Dirk Roosenburg	
Canal lock shed	Canal lock	Kadoelerweg bij 1	1939-1941; Designed by Dirk Roosenburg	
Canal service house	Canal lock	Kadoelerweg bij 1	1939-1941; Designed by Dirk Roosenburg	
Farm building of the Department of Wieringermeer	Ranch	Zwartemeerweg bij 46	1953	

== Luttelgeest ==
Rijksmonument	Type	Location	Description	Photo
Kuinder Castle	Archaeological monument		14th-century	
Round tower	Archaeological monument	Kuinder Castle	13th-15th century	

== Marknesse ==
Rijksmonument	Type	Location	Description	Photo
Workhousebr	Workhouse	Oudeweg 23	1944	

== Nagele ==
Rijksmonument	Type	Location	Description	Photo
Site of two former churches	Church	In Palenweg 5 / Ruïnepad	14th-century	
Ringloop Public School	School	Ring 17	Designed by E. Aldo van Eyck and HPD van Ginkel	
Klimop Protestant School	School	Ring 11	Designed by E. Aldo van Eyck and HPD van Ginkel	
Klimop Catholic School	School	Ring 1	Designed by E. Aldo van Eyck and HPD van Ginkel	

== Rutten ==
Rijksmonument	Type	Location	Description	Photo
Buma Pumphouse	Pumphouse	Gemaalweg 25	1939-1941; Designed by Dirk Roosenburg	
Buma lock	Pumphouse	Gemaalweg 25	1939-1941; Designed by Dirk Roosenburg	
Transformer Building	Pumphouse	Gemaalweg 25	Designed by E. Aldo van Eyck and HPD van Ginkel	
Lockwatcher's House	Pumphouse	Gemaalweg 25	Designed by E. Aldo van Eyck and HPD van Ginkel	
Lock shed	Pumphouse	Gemaalweg 25	Designed by E. Aldo van Eyck and HPD van Ginkel	
