= Victor de Stuers =

Dutch art historian, lawyer, civil servant and politician

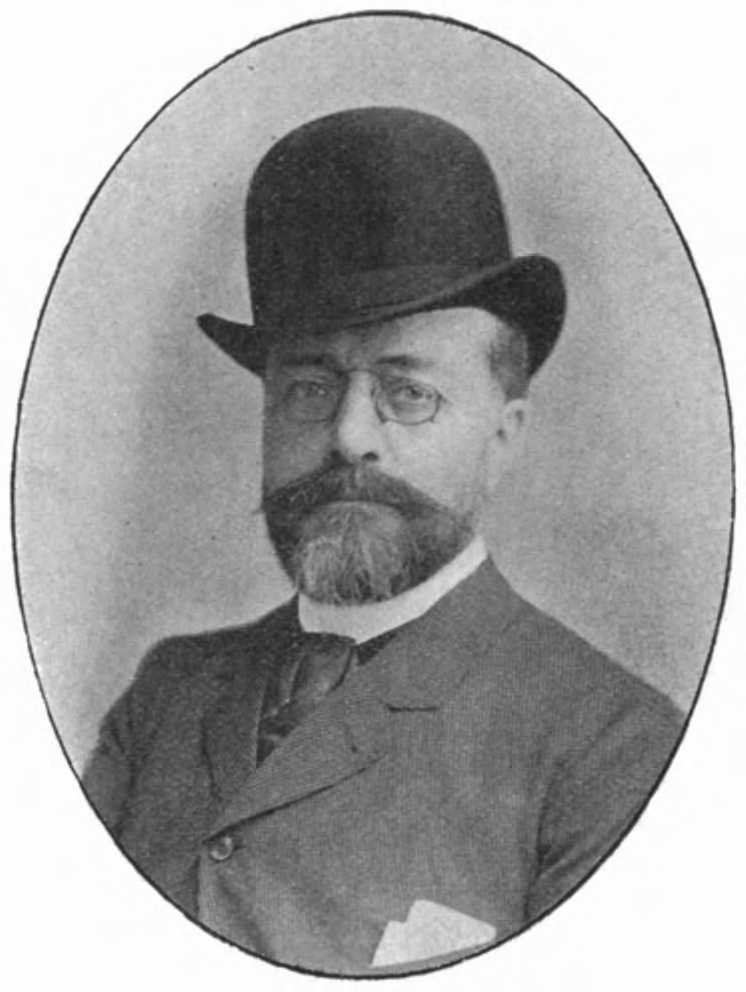
Victor de Stuers (before 1900)

Victor Eugène Louis de Stuers (20 October 1843, Maastricht – 21 March 1916, The Hague) was a Dutch art historian, lawyer, civil servant and politician. Widely regarded as the father of historic preservation in the Netherlands, he played a notable part in keeping Girl with a Pearl Earring, by Vermeer, from being sold abroad.

== Biography ==
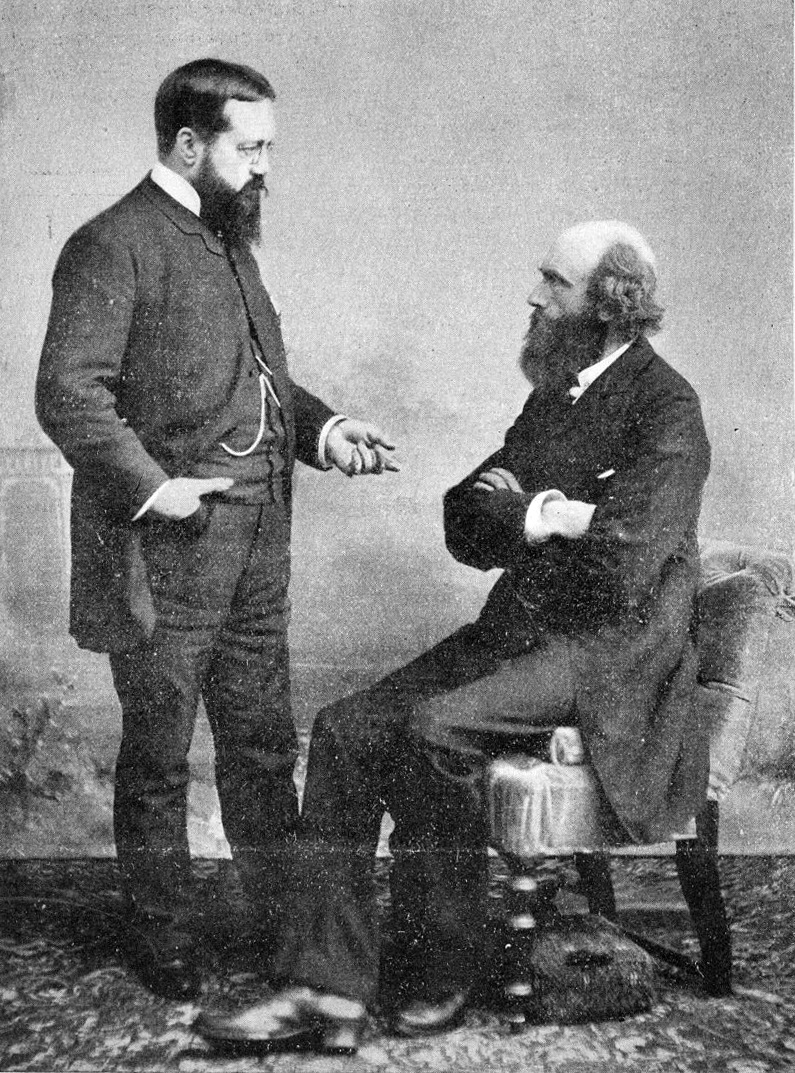
De Stuers and Cuypers

He was the third son of General Hubert Joseph Jean Lambert de Stuers, and his second wife, Hortense Joséphine Constance, Baroness Beyens (1814-1869). In 1861, he began studying law at the University of Leiden; obtaining his doctorate there in 1869. That same year, he was sworn in as a lawyer at the Supreme Court in The Hague.

During his time at the university, he had become interested in preserving historical buildings and works of art. In 1873, he published an essay in De Gids, a literary journal, in which he criticized the poor preservation of monuments, government architecture, and museum policy, among other subjects. The following year, a Royal Decree established the "Board of Government Advisors for the Monuments of History and Art", and De Stuers was named Secretary. They provided so many recommendations, the government agencies involved were overwhelmed.

In 1875, he helped to establish the Nederlandsch Museum voor Geschiedenis en Kunst (History and Art), now a part of the Rijksmuseum. For its first few years of operation, he served as Provisional Director and purchased the art. Its building was designed by his close friend, Pierre Cuypers. The design was heavily criticized, but received the support of Jan Heemskerk, the Minister of the Interior. Actual construction costs were almost three times the initial estimate, and King William III wrote to him on several occasions, to prohibit certain expenditures on features he disapproved of.

De Stuers was also interested in drawing education. To become more familiar with the subject, he took a seat on the committee for awarding the drawing teacher certifications. Later, he was named its Chairman. His work there resulted in the establishment of the Rijksnormaalschool voor Teekenonderwijzers in 1881. The years 1886 to 1894 saw him and the art critic, Pieter Anne Haaxman, involved in establishing the Haagse Museum van Kunstnijverheid (Applied Arts). He would serve many years there as a board member, and a major donor of art objects.

He served several terms in Parliament, and was involved in the affairs of what were then the Dutch East Indies. In 1907, together with Lodewijk Thomson, he attacked the crimes committed against civilians by Frits van Daalen, during the Aceh War. By 1908, he was suffering from gout, and was forced to deliver many of his speeches while seated.

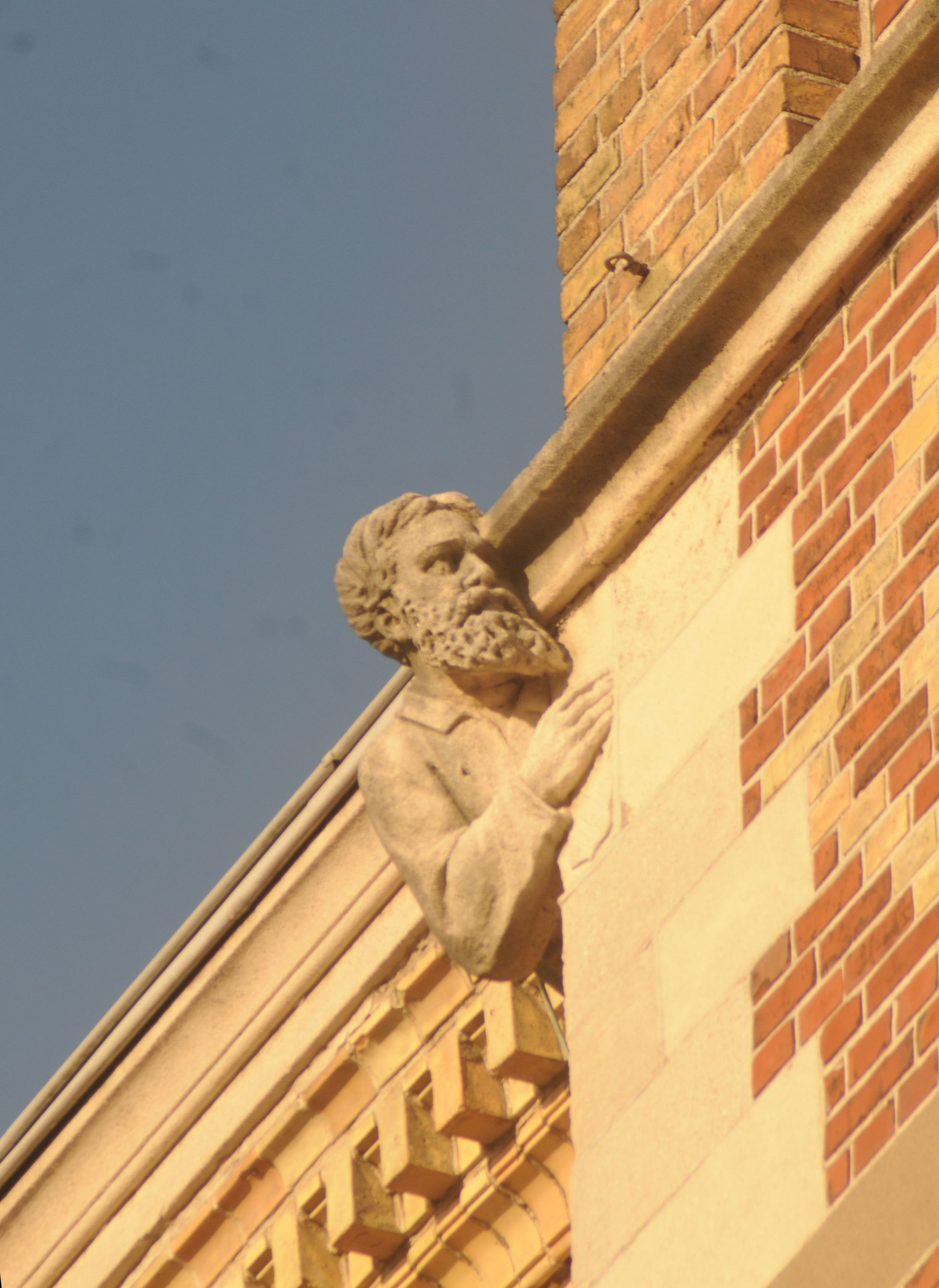
Figure of De Stuers, at the back of the Rijksmuseum

== Victor de Stuersprijs ==
The Victor de Stuersprijs has been presented annually since 1987 by the municipality of Maastricht. The award is for architects, their clients or institutions that play an important role in the preservation of the cultural heritage, or the promotion of the urban development or architectural quality, in the city of Maastricht. In even years, the prize is awarded to a new development project and in odd years to a restoration project.

Previous winners of the architecture award include: Wiel Arets (1987), Arno Meijs (1998), Hubert-Jan Henket (2000), Jo Coenen and Bruno Albert (2008), Fred Humblé (2012), Mathieu Bruls (2014) and Misak Terzibasiyan (2017). The heritage prize was awarded, among other things, for the redevelopment of major monuments by Maastricht University (1993) and for the restoration of the Basilica of Saint Servatius (1990), the Old Friars Minor Monastery (1997), the Jesuit Mountain (2001), the Kruisherenhotel (2005), Borgharen Castle (2009) and the "House of the Pelican" (2011).

== Works ==
- Da capo. Een woord over regeering, kunst en oude monumenten. 's-Gravenhage, Thieme, 1875.
- Beknopte beschrijving van de kunstvoorwerpen, tentoongesteld in het Koninklijk kabinet van schilderijen te 's-Gravenhage. 's Gravenhage, 1875.
- Het Binnenhof en 's lands gebouwen in de residentie. 's Gravenhage, Van Stockum, 1891.

== Bibliography ==
- J.A.C. Tillema: Victor de Stuers : ideeën van een individualist, Van Gorcum, 1982 ISBN 978-90-232-1937-8

House of Representatives of the Netherlands
Preceded by Jan Truijen	Member for Weert; 1901–1916	Succeeded by Henri van Groenendael
