= Johan Paul van Limburg Stirum =

Dutch politician (1873–1948)

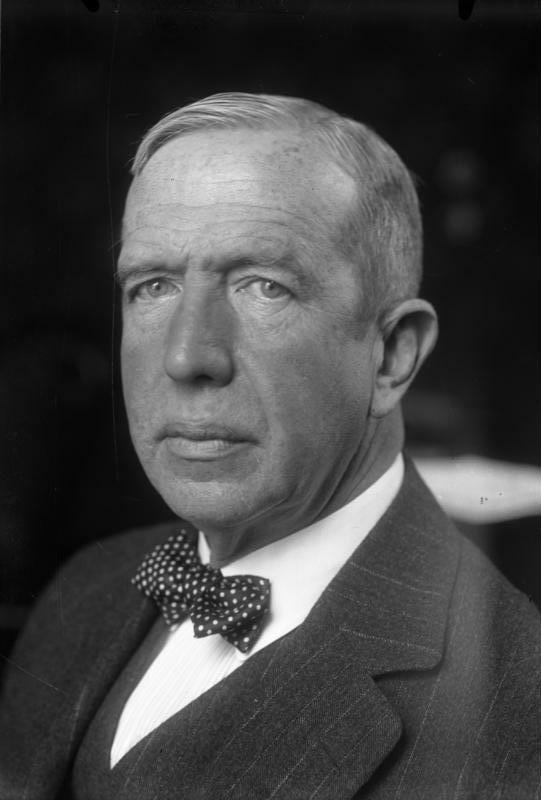
- Johan Paul van Limburg Stirum in 1924

Governor-General of the Dutch East Indies
- In office 21 March 1916 – 21 March 1921
- Monarch: Wilhelmina
- Preceded by: Alexander Idenburg
- Succeeded by: Dirk Fock

Personal details
- Born: 2 February 1873 Zwolle, Netherlands
- Died: 17 April 1948 (aged 75) The Hague, Netherlands

Johan Paul, Count of Limburg-Stirum (2 February 1873 – 17 April 1948) was a Dutch diplomat, member of the House of Limburg-Stirum, Governor-General of the Dutch East Indies (1916–1921), Dutch ambassador to Germany (1925–1936) and to the United Kingdom (1936–1939).

== Biography ==
Johan Paul van Limburg Stirum was born on 2 February 1873 in Zwolle in the Netherlands.

He made a rapid career as a diplomat of the Netherlands and was, among others, envoy in China and Sweden.

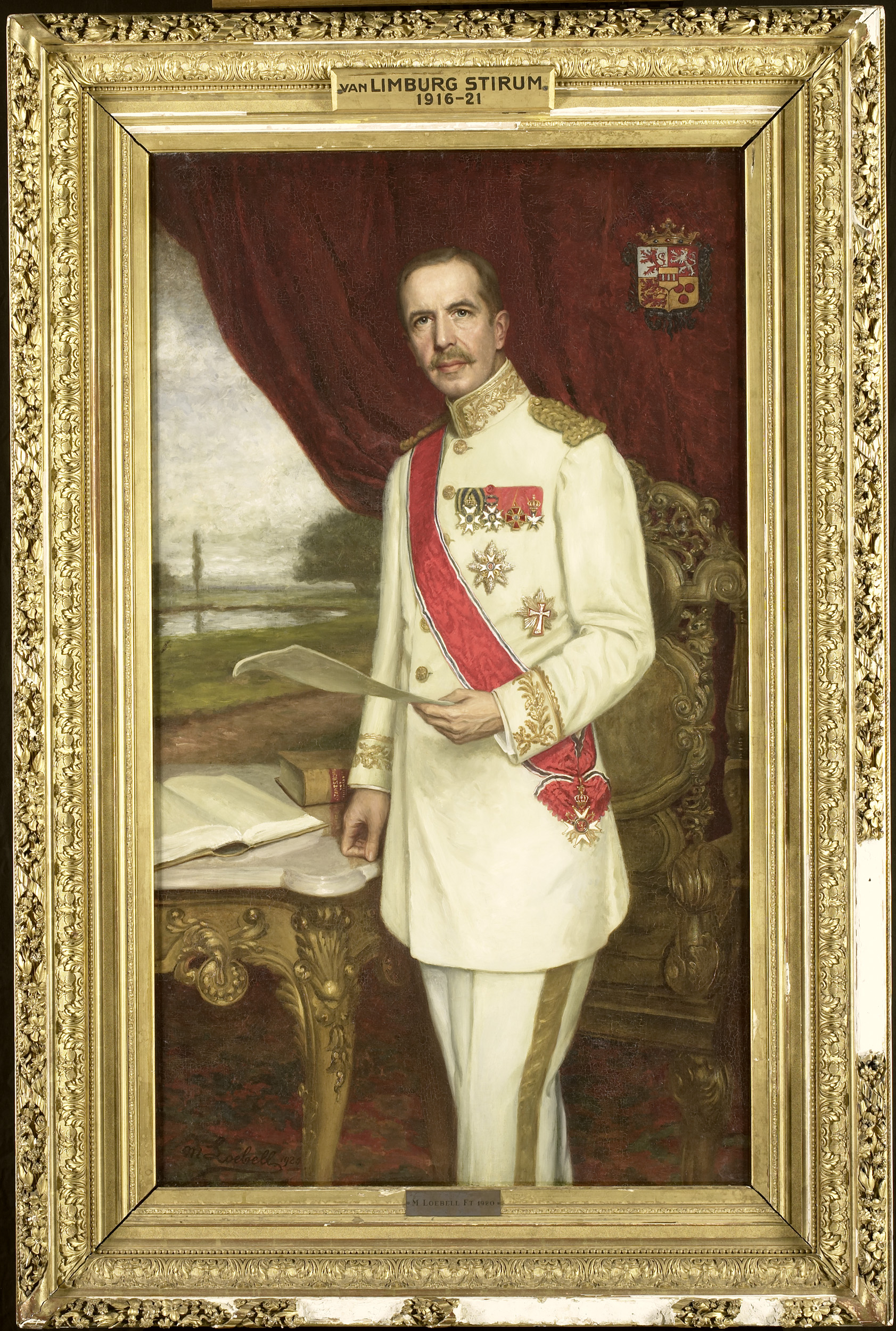
Johan Paul van Limburg Stirum

Due to his knowledge of Asia, the government Cort van der Linden named him in 1916 Gouverneur General of the Dutch East Indies. He worked for a greater autonomy of the Dutch East Indies and for the economic development of the colony. As Governor General he adhered to the Dutch Ethical Policy and conducted administrative reforms, such as the extension of the powers of the parliament (Volksraad) of the Dutch East Indies and decentralisation of the colonial administration.

He worked in good terms with minister Idenburg, but had a difficult relationship with minister Andries Cornelis Dirk de Graeff, who was an old friend from their days at Leiden University.

After his departure from the Dutch East Indies, he was accredited an Ambassador to Egypt in Cairo, from november 1922 to Decembre 1924.

In 1925, he was sent to Berlin as Dutch Ambassador for Germany. He was a strong opponent of the nazi regime and refused to meet Hitler or any member of the NSDAP.

From the 16th of July 1937, to his retirement the 6th Decembre 1939, he was Dutch ambassador to the United Kingdom, in London.

He died on 17 April 1948 in The Hague.

Political offices
Preceded by Alexander Willem Frederik Idenburg	Governor-General of the Dutch East Indies; 1916–1921	Succeeded by Dirk Fock
