= H. Wortman Pumping Station =

- Gemaal H. Wortman
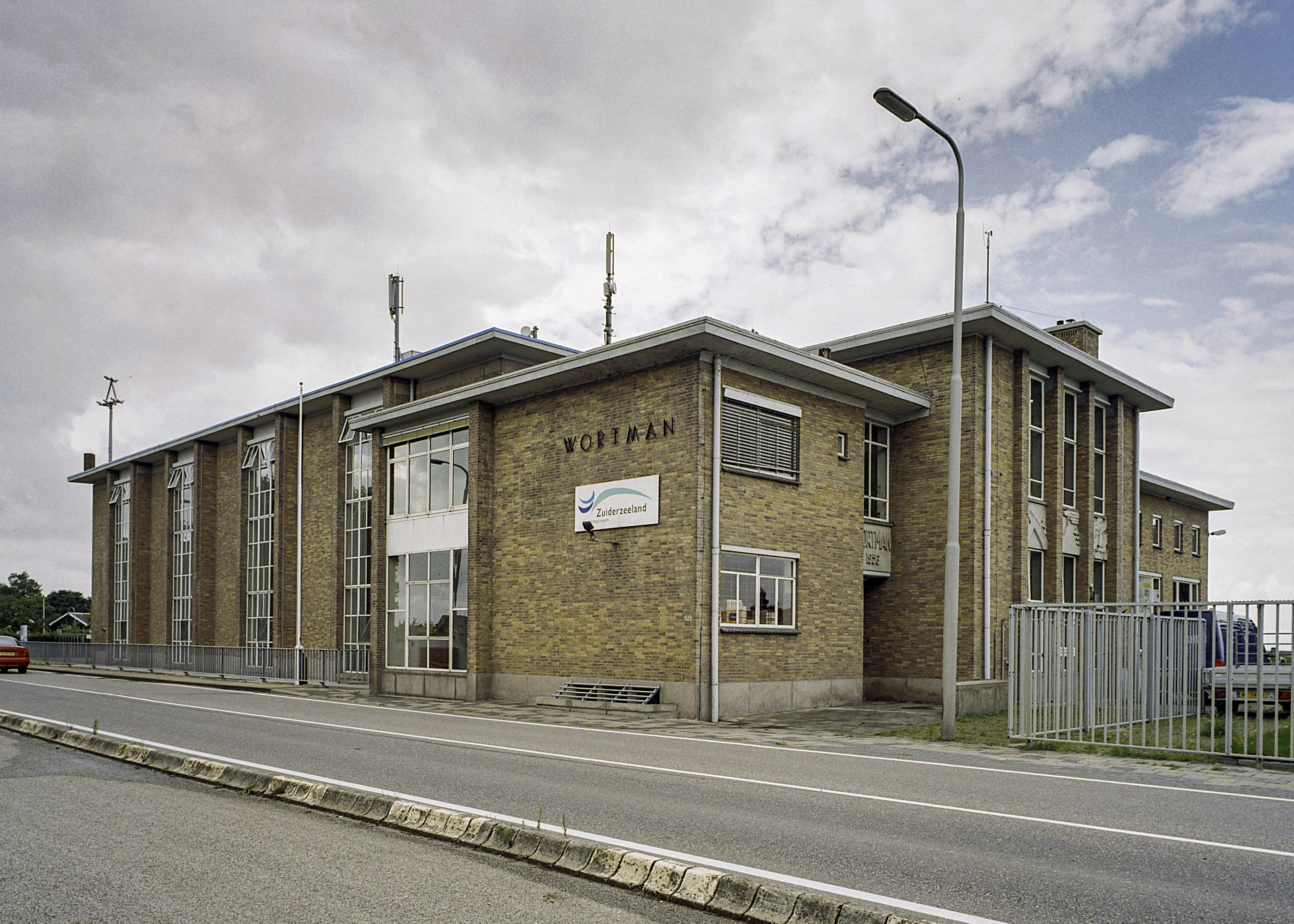
- Interactive map of the H. Wortman Pumping Station area

General information
- Location: Oostvaardersdijk 32, Lelystad, Netherlands
- Coordinates: 52°30′11″N 5°25′13″E
- Named for: Hendrik Wortman
- Year built: 1951–1956
- Owner: Zuiderzeeland Water Authority

The H. Wortman Pumping Station (Dutch: Gemaal H. Wortman) is a pumping station in Lelystad, Flevoland, the Netherlands. Named for Hendrik Wortman, a civil engineer who contributed to the Zuiderzee Works, the station was designed by Dirk Roosenburg and completed in 1956. It was used for the reclamation of the eastern Flevopolder in 1957, and contributed to the reclamation of the polder's southern areas. It was declared a municipal monument in 2017.

== Design and layout ==
The Wortman Pumping Station is situated at Oostvaardersdijk 32 in Lelystad, Flevoland, the Netherlands. It consists of a series of blocks, built atop a concrete substructure that contains the suction and pressure shafts. Central is a one-storey machine hall with a mastic gable roof. To the side of the hall are various service rooms, spread across two storeys. The superstructure is built on a concrete frame, filled with alternating brick and glass facades; these glass panes were initially framed in steel, but are currently framed in aluminium.

In its engine room, the pumping station contains four centrifugal pumps on concrete volutes, which are driven by four seven-cylinder diesel engines. Each pump has the capacity to remove 500 cubic metres (18,000 cu ft), or 500,000 litres (110,000 imp gal; 130,000 US gal), per minute. Water is drained into the Markermeer, with check valves ensuring that the discharge is not returned to the polder. Fuel for the engines was originally stored aboveground; a subterranean storage facility has since been installed northeast of the station.

On its southwest façade, the pumping station features a relief by Paul Grégoire. At the centre of the relief are three individuals: a woman, a young child, and a man. The woman, representing the sea, is giving the child (representing the land) to a man, who will inhabit the land and use it productively. Surrounding this relief are symbols of the sea and the land, including fish, shells, and a beaver. On the northeast facade is another relief, completed by Gerard van Remmen. The pumping station also features a mural by Hans van Norden. This work symbolizes the bridging of land and sea, which are depicted under a flying Dutch flag.

Near the station are several residences, which were previously occupied by the service staff. The complex also includes a lock, the Noordersluis, through which shipping traffic can pass. It measures 65 metres (213 ft) long and 8 metres (26 ft) wide.

== History ==
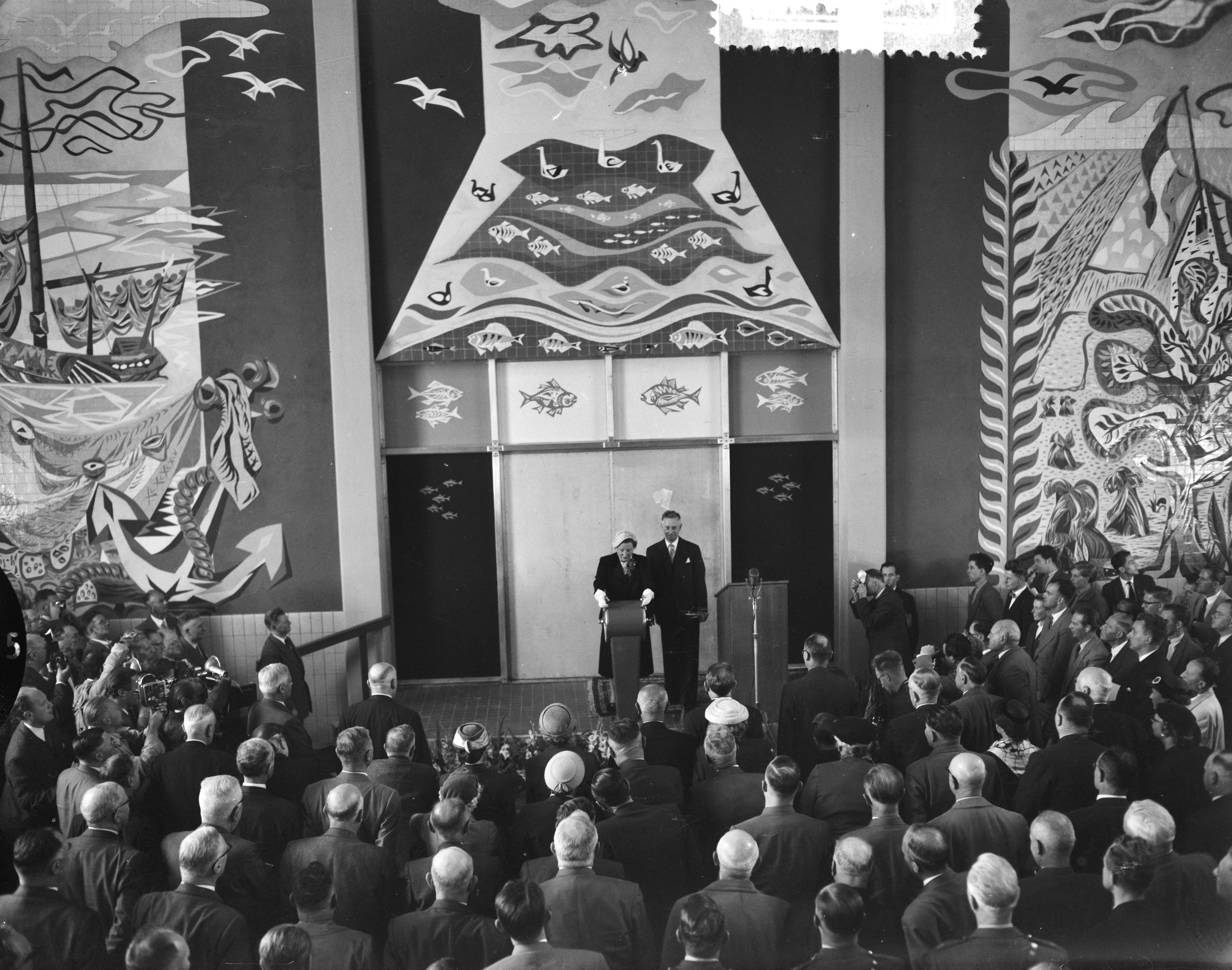
Queen Juliana declaring the station operational

The Wortman Pumping Station was designed by the architect Dirk Roosenburg. It is named after Hendrik Wortman, a Dutch civil engineer who contributed to the Zuiderzee Works and later chaired its council. Excavation of the construction pit began in 1951, and was completed in 1952. The first pile was driven the following September. American-made pumps were acquired through the Marshall Plan.

The Lelystad dyke was closed on 13 September 1956; later that day, Queen Juliana officially declared the commencement of operations at the Wortman Pumping Station. However, construction was incomplete, and shortly thereafter the station temporarily ceased operations so that it could be finished. On 17 November, two of the initial three pumps began operations, with drainage taking place eighteen hours per day. Shortly thereafter, a third pump began operations, allowing for non-stop drainage. The station's design allowed for the installation of a fourth pump, which occurred several years later.

Together with the Colijn Pumping Station in Ketelhaven and the H. J. Lovink Pumping Station in Biddinghuizen, the Wortman Pumping Station was used for the reclamation of the eastern Flevopolder, which was officially declared dry on 27 June 1957. The area around the Wortman Pumping Station, which was covered in the deepest water, remained swampy after this declaration. Only several years later was agriculture possible. These three stations subsequently contributed to the reclamation of the southern Flevopolder, which was achieved in 1968.

In May 1987, a fire – attributed to engine failure – occurred at the Wortman Pumping Station. Damages were estimated in the millions of guilder, and the station was out of service for several weeks. In 2017, Lelystad declared the Wortman Pumping Station a municipal monument as part of the Werkeiland. The station is currently owned and operated by the Zuiderzeeland Water Authority. The station is only operated in exceptional circumstances, such as heavy rainfall.

== Works cited ==
- "Gemaal Lovink" [Lovink Pumping Station]. Flevoland Heritage (in Dutch). Fleurbaaij Kunst & Cultuur. Archived from the original on 27 September 2023.
- "Gemaal Lovink" [Lovink Pumping Station] (in Dutch). Zuiderzeeland Water Authority. 26 May 2020. Archived from the original on 8 June 2024.
- "Gemaal Wortman" [Wortman Pumping Station]. Flevoland Heritage (in Dutch). Fleurbaaij Kunst & Cultuur. Archived from the original on 25 September 2023.
- "Gemaal Wortman" (Map). Google Maps.
- "Gemaal Wortman in Lelystad Verwoest" [Wortman Station in Lelystad Destroyed]. De Telegraaf (in Dutch). Amsterdam. 18 May 1987. p. 3.
- "Koningin Stelt het Gemaal 'Wortman' in Werking" [Queen Orders 'Wortman' Station into Operations]. De Tijd (in Dutch). 's-Hertogenbosch. 13 September 1956. p. 7.
- "Sluis van Gemaal Wortman" [Sluice of the Wortman Station]. 't Nieuws voor Kampen (in Dutch). Kampen. 27 March 1956. p. 3.
- "The Wortman Pumping Station". Nieuw Land National Park. Archived from the original on 4 March 2024.
- Voerman, Egbert (23 August 2023). "Uit de Polderklei, Deel 14 – Gemaal Wortman" [From the Polder Clay, Vol 14 – Wortman Station]. FlevoPost (in Dutch). Lelystad. Archived from the original on 26 September 2023.
- "Wortman" (in Dutch). Netherlands Pumping Station Foundation. Archived from the original on 9 June 2024.
- "Waterschap Zuiderzeeland staat Paraat voor Hoogwater: 'Maar Geen Zorgen'" [Zuiderzeeland Water Authority Ready for High Water: 'Don't Worry']. Omroep Flevoland (in Dutch). Lelystad. 25 December 2023. Archived from the original on 27 December 2023.
