= Alexander Idenburg =

Dutch politician (1861–1935)

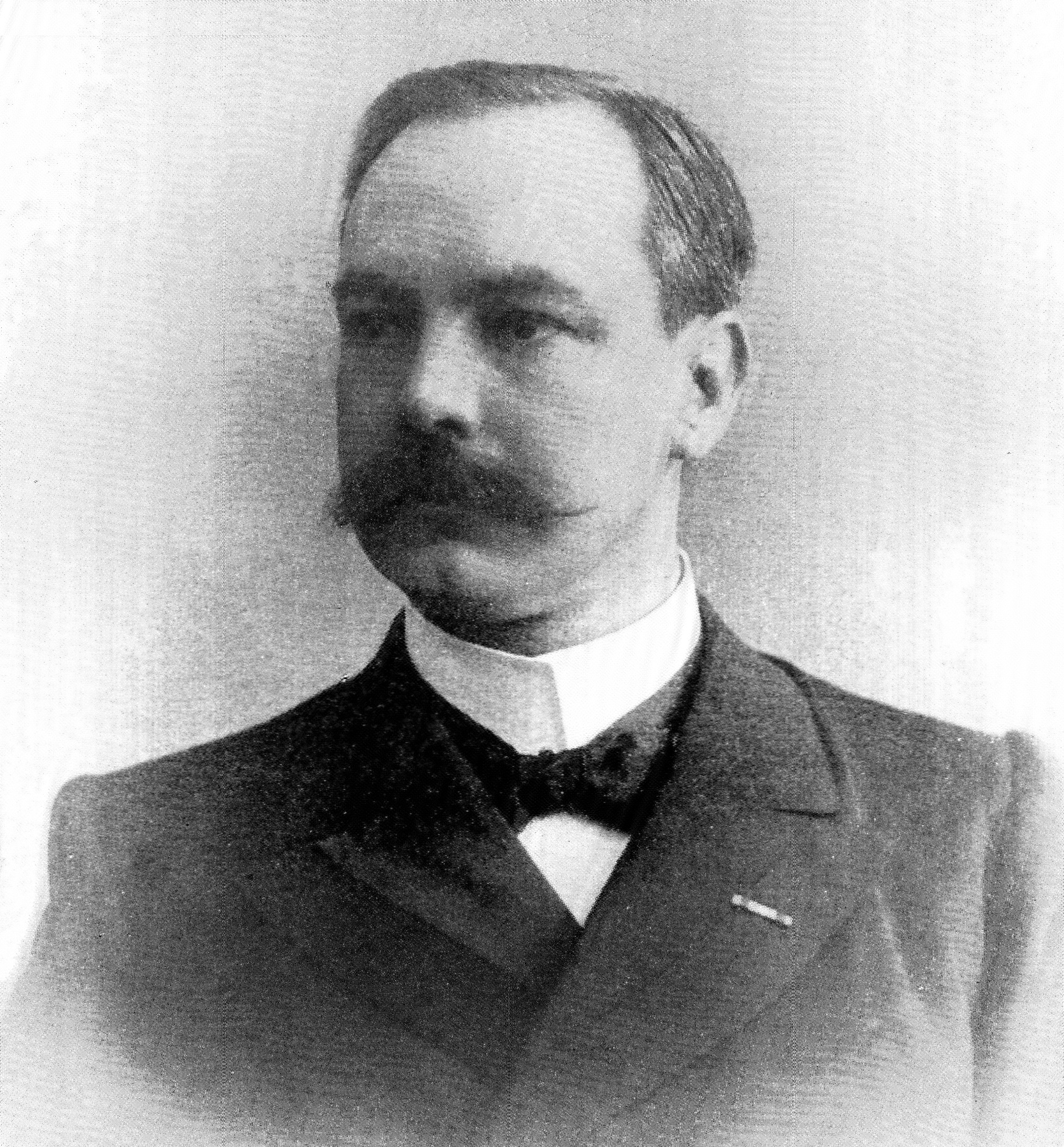
- Idenburg in 1903

Council of State
- In office 17 February 1925 – 28 February 1935

Governor-General of the Dutch East Indies
- In office 18 December 1909 – 21 March 1916
- Monarch: Wilhelmina
- Preceded by: Joannes van Heutsz
- Succeeded by: J. van Limburg Stirum

Governor-General of Suriname
- In office 14 November 1905 – 28 February 1908
- Monarch: Wilhelmina
- Preceded by: Cornelis Lely
- Succeeded by: Dirk Fock

Personal details
- Born: Alexander Willem Frederik Idenburg; 23 July 1861 Rotterdam, Netherlands
- Died: 28 February 1935 (aged 73) The Hague, Netherlands
- Party: Anti-Revolutionary

Alexander Willem Frederik Idenburg (23 July 1861 – 28 February 1935) was a Dutch military officer and politician of the Anti-Revolutionary Party who served as Governor-General of Suriname from 1905 until 1908, and the Dutch East Indies from 1909 until 1916. He also served as Minister of Colonies on three occasions between 1902 and 1919. Idenburg served on the Council of State from 1925 until his death in 1935.

== Biography ==
Idenburg was born on 23 July 1861 in Rotterdam, Netherlands. At the age of 16, he was sent to Koninklijke Militaire Academie. In 1881, he was commissioned second lieutenant at the military engineers of the Royal Netherlands East Indies Army (KNIL). In 1889–1890, he was sent to the Aceh War, but did not participate in the fighting. Between 1896 and 1901, he was the president of the cabinet of General Major J.A. Vetter.

During an 1894–1895 leave, Idenburg met Abraham Kuyper who became his political friend. In 1901, he ran for the House of Representatives and was elected. Idenburg returned to the Netherlands, and served in parliament until 25 September 1902. Subsequently he was appointed Minister of Colonies. In 1903, he passed the Decentralisation Law which allowed the East Indies to established independently financed regional councils. He served until 16 August 1905.

=== Suriname ===
On 14 September 1905, Idenburg was appointed Governor-General of Suriname. He arrived on 18 November 1905. During his tenure, he developed the "Idenburg Plan" in order to achieve financial independence for the colony, however it did not pass. As an orthodox protestant, he had refused attend parties and receptions which were held on Sunday. He passed the Sunday Law enforcing a mandatory free day on Sunday, and forced closure of all shops. Four Muslim shopkeepers who closed their shops on Friday, but reopened on Sunday, were sentenced to a ƒ5,- fine. In February 1908, he applied for sick leave. On 28 February, he resigned as governor.

=== Dutch East Indies ===
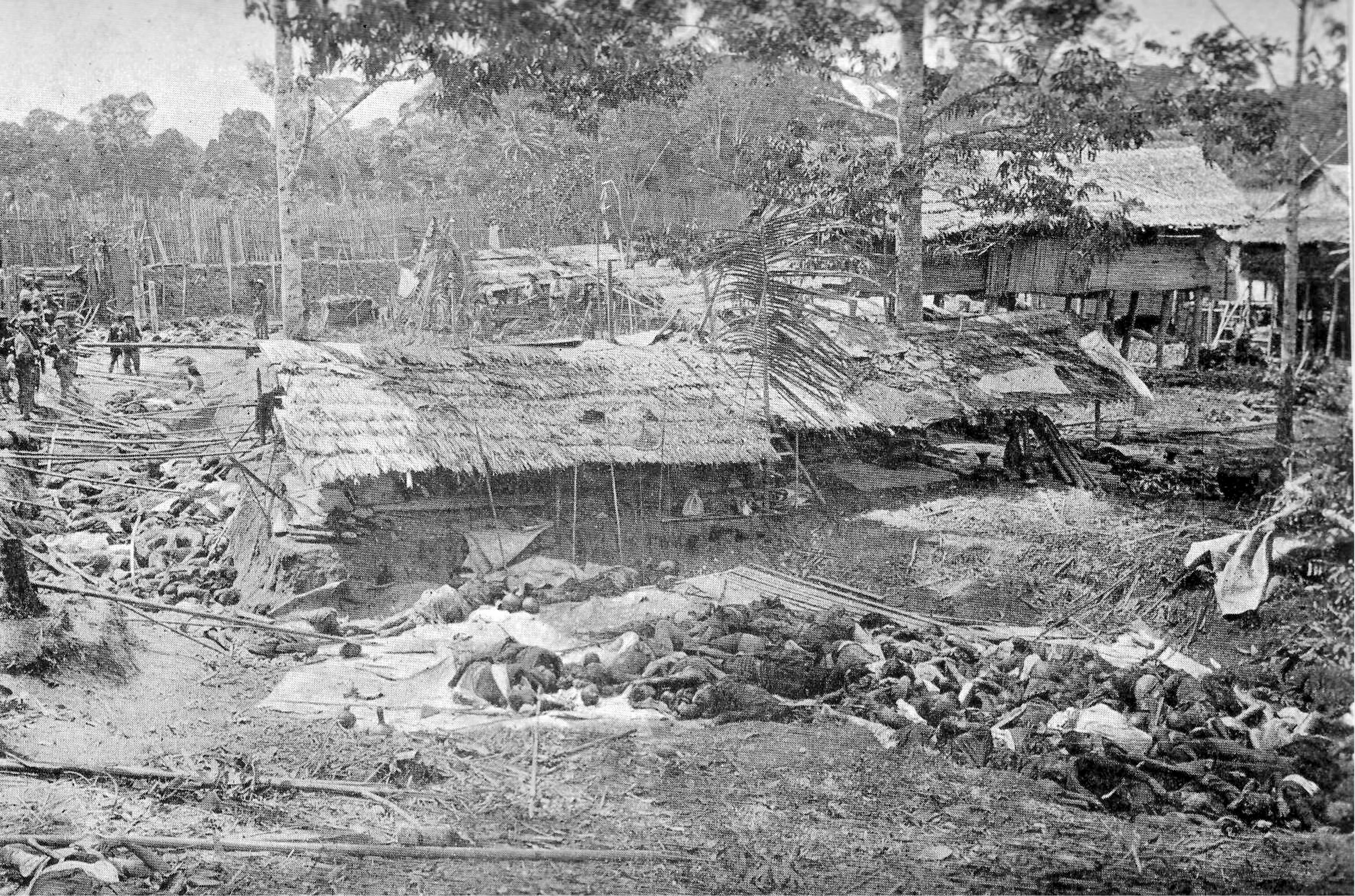
Picture of the Kuta Reh massacre by van Daalen taken on 14 June 1904 with the trench of dead civilians

From 18 May 1908 until 16 August 1909, Idenburg returned as Minister of Colonies. During his tenure, the atrocities of Gotfried van Daalen were revealed. Van Daalen had lost twelve men during the Aceh Wars, but – as is now known – to have caused at least 2,922 native deaths including at least 1,149 women and children. Idenburg defended van Daalen, but could not prevent an investigation into the massacre. Van Daalen decided to turn in his resignation. He was later controversially absolved of all crimes, and re-enlisted.

On 21 August 1909, Idenburg was appointed Governor-General of the Dutch East Indies where arrived on 18 December 1909. During his tenure, he was confronted by the nationalist movement. In 1912, Sarekat Islam was founded. Idenburg refused to take action against Sarekat Islam, but did not recognize the political party until 1916.

In 1913, Idenburg interned the journalist Ernest Douwes Dekker (a relative of Multatuli) for founding the Indische Party. In September 1913, Douwes Dekker was exiled from the Dutch East Indies and not allowed to travel to the Netherlands either. In 1914, Douwes Dekker's writings were banned. Idenburg tried to pass a Sunday Law in the Dutch East Indies, but only managed a watered down version. He served until 21 March 1916.

=== Later life ===
On 9 September 1918, Idenburg was reappointed as Minister of Colonies, but resigned on 13 November 1919 due to health problems. In 1923, he received the honorary title of Minister of State. On 17 February 1925, he was appointed to the Council of State, an advisory council to the government.

Idenburg died on 28 February 1935 in The Hague, at the age of 73.

== Honours ==
- Netherlands Commander in the Order of the Netherlands Lion.
- Mecklenburg Grand Cross in the Order of Henry the Lion.
- Japan Grand Cross in the Order of the Sacred Treasure.

== Gallery ==
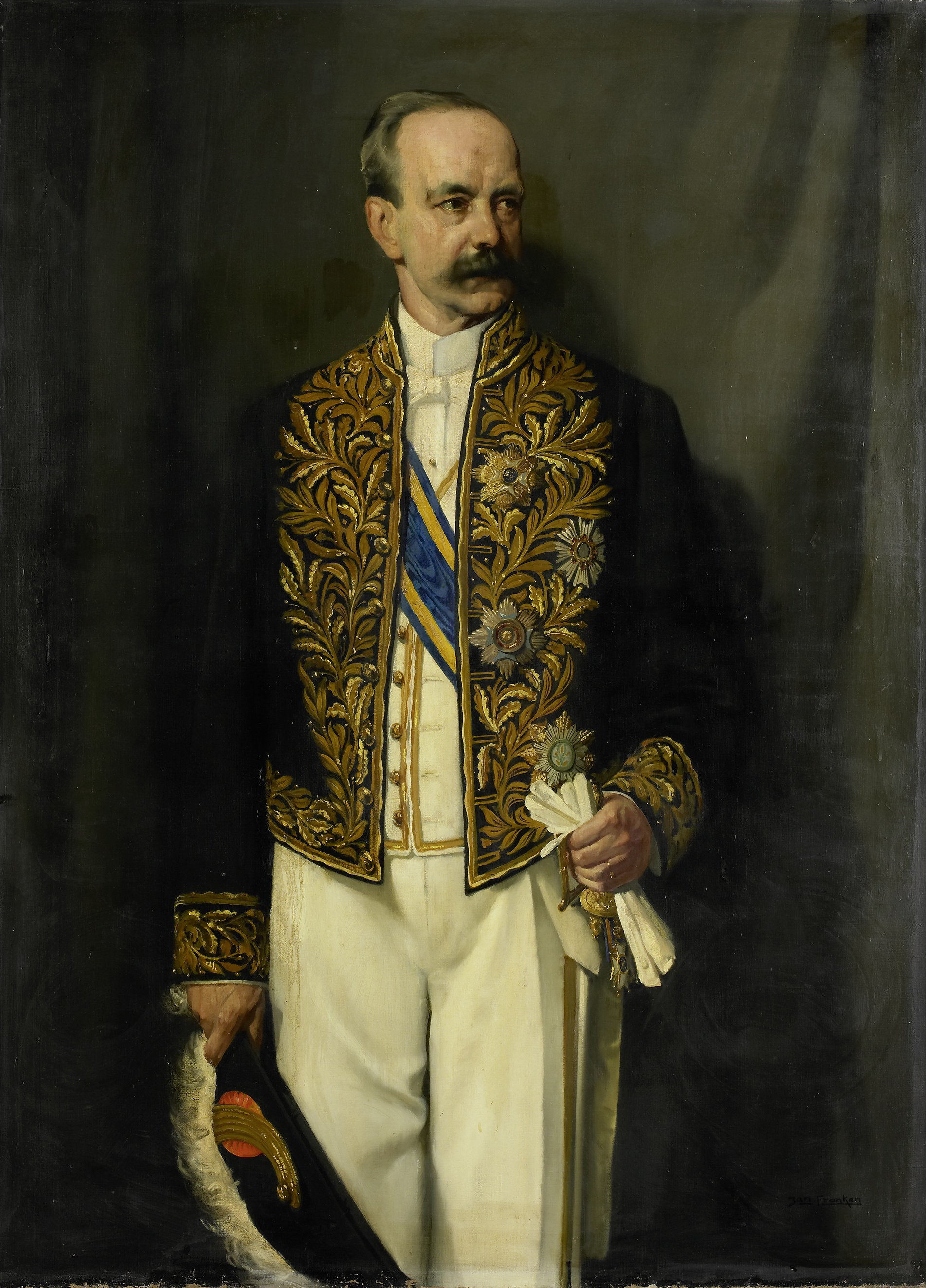
Idenburg (1910s)

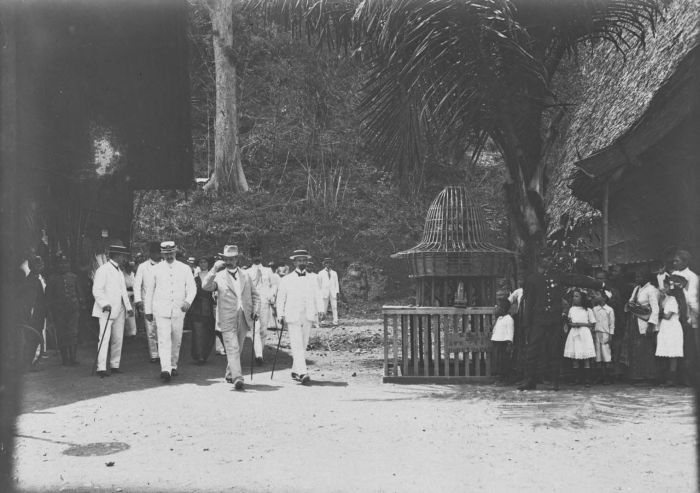
Visit to the Colonial Exhibition of Semarang (1914)

Political offices
Preceded by Titus van Asch van Wijck	Minister of Colonial Affairs; 1902–1905	Succeeded by Dirk Fock
Preceded by Cornelis Lely	Governor-General of Suriname; 1905–1908	Succeeded by Dirk Fock
Preceded by Theo Heemskerk	Minister of Colonial Affairs; 1908–1909	Succeeded by Jan Hendrik de Waal Malefijt
Preceded by J. B. van Heutsz	Governor-General of the Dutch East Indies; 1909–1916	Succeeded by Count van Limburg Stirum
Preceded by Thomas Bastiaan Pleyte	Minister of Colonial Affairs; 1918–1919	Succeeded by Simon de Graaff
