= Misak Terzibasiyan =

Dutch architect (born 1964)

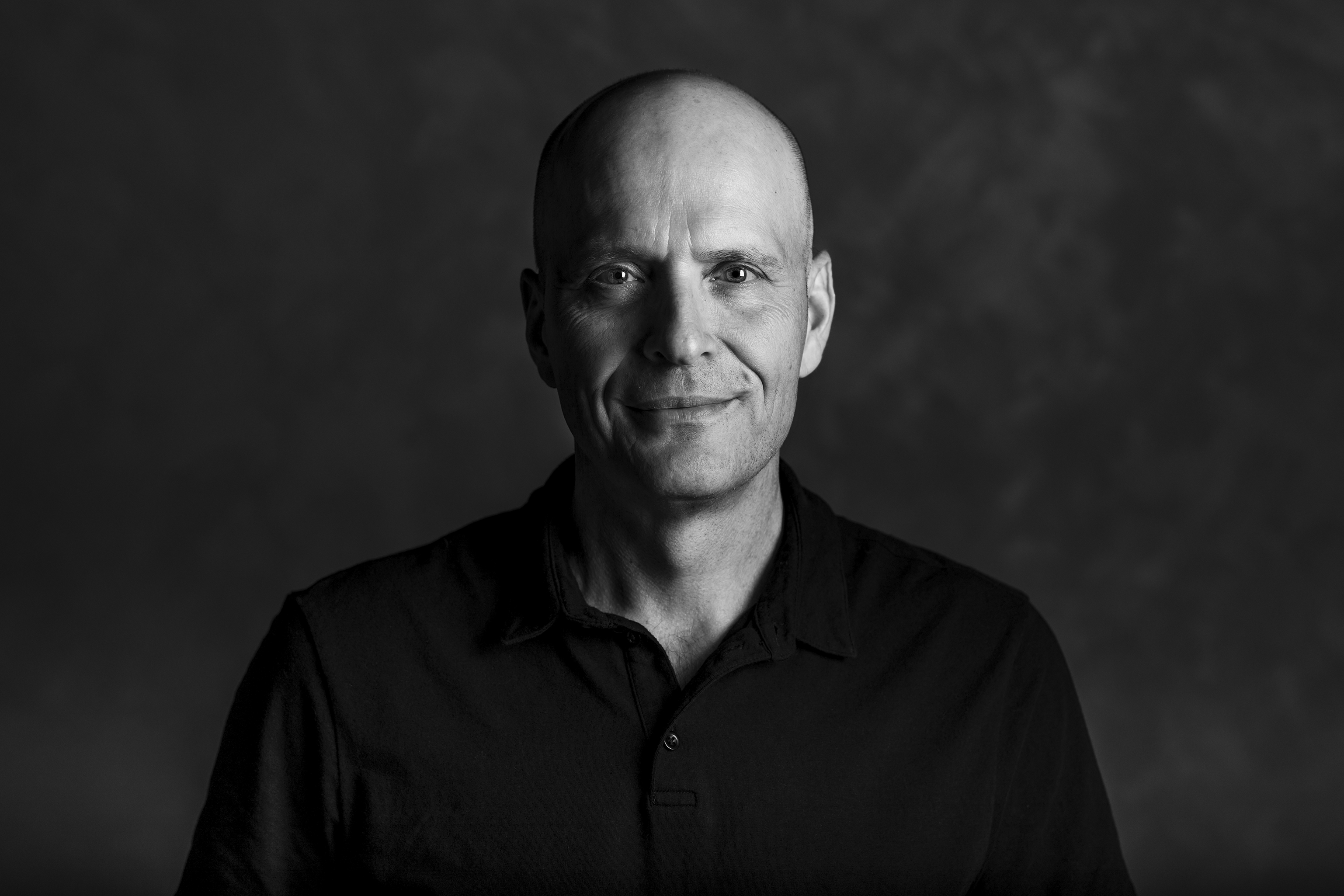
Misak Terzibasiyan

Misak Terzibasiyan (born 1964) is a Dutch architect.

Misak Terzibasiyan's mother, Vappu Viuha, was of Finnish descent; his father, textile designer Edward Terzibasiyan, had Armenian roots. Misak studied at Eindhoven University of Technology from 1985 to 1991 graduating in Architecture, Urban Design and Building Sciences. After graduating, he worked between 1991 and 1994 as an architect in Cologne. He furthered his architectural career with various offices in the Netherlands between 1994 and 2003. In 2003, Terzibasiyan set up his own architectural studio UArchitects in Eindhoven. He is a member of the welfare committee in various municipalities and regularly publishes on de Architect website.

== Buildings ==
As part of his firm UArchitects, Terzibasiyan has built schools (such as De Brug in Belgium and De Vogelsgeluk in southern Netherlands), detention facilities and private housing.

== Awards and nominations ==
Since 2003, Misak has received national and international awards and nominations, including first prize for the Community School in Bocholt, Dirk Roosenberg Prize in 2015 with 't Hofke, Victor de Stuers Prize 2017 with IKC de Geluksvogel. Other awards also include Edu Build Award in 2011, the 2014 German Design Award with Split-View, the American Architecture Prize 2016 in the category "Education" and the BB Green Award 2017 in China for Modern Collective Living, second prize at the World Architecture & Design Awards 2019 with IKC de Geluksvogel. Shortlist nomination 2019 for Worldwide Brick Award with IKC de Geluksvogel.
