= Tony Lovink =

Dutch diplomat

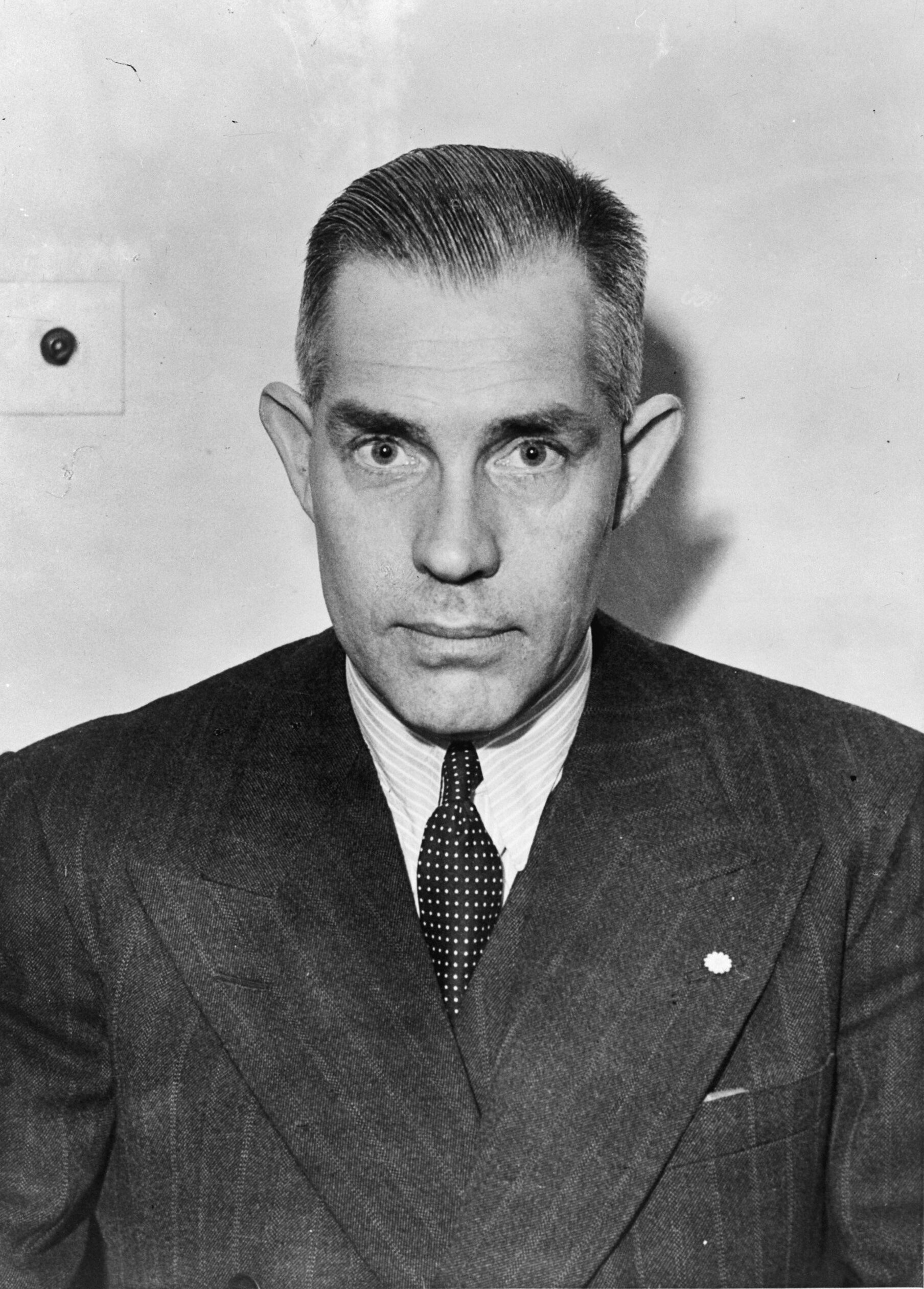
- Official portrait, 1942

High Representative of the Crown in the Dutch East Indies
- In office 18 May 1949 – 27 December 1949
- Monarch: Juliana
- Prime Minister: Willem Drees
- Preceded by: Louis Beel
- Succeeded by: Sukarno (as President of the United States of Indonesia)

Personal details
- Born: Antonius Hermanus Johannes Lovink; 12 July 1902 The Hague, Netherlands
- Died: 27 March 1995 (aged 92) Ottawa, Ontario, Canada
- Spouse: Clara Roeline Nagel
- Parent: Hermanus Lovink (father)
- Education: Heidelberg University
- Occupation: Politician; diplomat

Antonius Hermanus Johannes Lovink (12 July 1902 – 27 March 1995) was a Dutch diplomat who served as the last High Representative of the Crown in the Dutch East Indies from 18 May 1949 until 27 December 1949, the year the Dutch East Indies declared independence from the Netherlands, and renamed itself Indonesia. He was the son of former member of parliament Hermanus Johannes Lovink, who was also mayor of Alphen.

In May 1942, he arrived in London from the Japanese-occupied Dutch East Indies. Lovink became secretary-general of the Department of General Warfare of the Dutch government in exile. Lovink, after a diplomatic and civil service career, succeeded Beel as High Representative of the Crown in the Dutch East Indies in May 1949. His time in that position was not always a happy one, and he did not stay in Indonesia after the transfer of sovereignty in December 1949, as initially intended. He later served as Dutch Ambassador to Canada where he was also dean of the Corps Diplomatique, and Australia, and then back again to Canada in 1960. He continued to live in Ottawa after he resigned in 1967, until his death in 1995.

Political offices
Preceded by Louis Beel	High Representative of the Crown in the Dutch East Indies; 1949	Succeeded by Sukarno as President of the United States of Indonesia
