= Dirk Roosenburg =

Dutch architect (1887–1962)

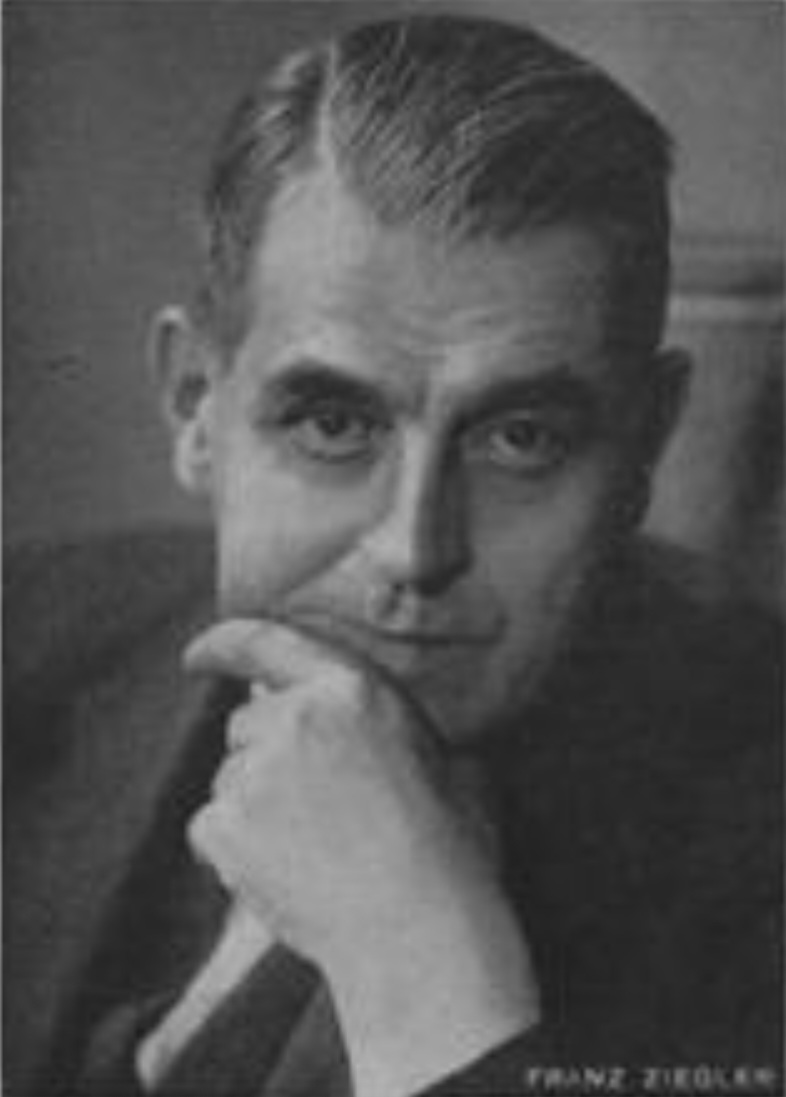
- Born: June 6, 1887; The Hague, South Holland, Netherlands
- Died: October 22, 1962 (aged 75); The Hague, South Holland, Netherlands

Dirk Roosenburg (June 6, 1887 – October 22, 1962) was a Dutch architect and designer.

== Early years ==
His father Dirk Leonard Roosenburg was a doctor, his mother Selinde came from the entrepreneurial family Fentener van Vlissingen. Dirk Roosenburg was the couple's third son and had a total of four brothers and two sisters. He grew up in The Hague and attended the Hogereburgschool, where he showed good performance in geometry and drawing.

== Education ==
Roosenburg studied from 1905 to 1911 at the Delft University of Technology. He then spent another year at the École des Beaux-Arts in Paris. He found a job with Jan Stuyt for the Government Buildings Agency. Later he became a pupil of – and draughtsman for – Berlage. From 1919 he worked together with A.H. op ten Noort and L.S.P. Scheffer at TABROS agency, and in 1921 bought out of the company to start his own agency. He settled in the studio of painter Arie Martinus Lugt on the Kerkhoflaan in The Hague. It is at that location that he also built his own house.

== Career ==
In 1919, the year that KLM was founded, Roosenburg designed the original KLM logo. The design featured an orange-white-blue flag with a black hexagon and KLM letters in black inside. Wings on the left and right and a royal crown on top completed the design. Between 1919 and 1939, he designed several Philips industrial buildings in Eindhoven. In 1929 he made a monument in the Westbroek Park in The Hague in memory of Pieter Westbroek, director of The Hague Parks Department and designer of the park that bears his name. It's a bench made of stone, brick, wood and concrete. At the request of his childhood friend Albert Plesman he designed the KLM headquarters in The Hague. The first wing was completed in 1940, the construction work was resumed after the war from 1946 onwards. In 1969 the building was taken over by the Dutch Ministry of Transport and Water Management.

When he was almost sixty, Roosenburg entered into a partnership with two employees: Verhave and Luyt, and later De Jong also joined the firm as a partner. Roosenburg was the designer of the KLM head office, which was opened in his presence by Prince Bernhard. The firm was later renamed LIAG Architecten en Bouwadviseurs, where his grandson, D.A. Roosenburg, became partner after a merger. In 1949 the town hall of Vlissingen (1949–1964) was built, designed by Roosenburg. Architect Roosenburg, who designed the Philips head office in Eindhoven, was sometimes referred to as the house architect of KLM, Philips and Stork, and he was also the designer of numerous projects for the national government. Roosenburg was a contemporary of Willem Dudok, Jacobus Johannes Pieter Oud and Gerrit Rietveld. He was the designer of the Stevin and Lorentz drainage sluices and the customs office of the Afsluitdijk, and of the Velser Tunnel. Many of his buildings have been declared a national monument.

== Works and designs ==
- 1917: Stand at the Jaarbeurs Utrecht.
- 1918: Sculpture of the brothers De Witt, Dordrecht.
- 1921: His own home on the Kerhoflaan in The Hague.
- 1923: Philips Natlab in Eindhoven.
- 1927: Huize Windekind on the Nieuwe Parklaan in The Hague.
- 1930: the Lely Pumping Station near Medemblik.
- 1930: locks of the Twente canal.
- 1931: the Witte Dame in Eindhoven.
- 1931: head office of the Oranje Nassau mines in Heerlen.
- 1931: Het Wooldhuis, De Zandloper and Waailust. Mayor's residence and service quarters in Vlissingen.
- 1932: Closure dike: Stevinsluizen & Lorentzsluizen (with customs house).
- 1933: Lock in Eefde
- 1935: the Dutch Pavilion at the 1935 World Exhibition in Brussels.
- 1935: Airport building Welschap near Eindhoven
- 1936: At the request of his childhood friend Albert Plesman, he designed the KLM head office on the Plesmanweg in The Hague. The first wing was completed in 1940, with construction resuming in 1946. It was taken into use in 1969 by the Ministry of Transport, Public Works and Water Management.
- 1939: the Apollo House in Amsterdam
- 1939: the Smeenge, Vissering and Buma pumping stations in the Noordoostpolder
- 1939: new office building of the Heemaf, nicknamed "Locomotive", in Hengelo
- 1940: KLM headquarters
- 1956: H. J. Lovink Pumping Station, H. Wortman Pumping Station
- 1957: Ventilation building of the Velsertunnels

== Personal life ==
Dirk Rosenburg married Anna Petronella Luyt. The couple had 6 children: Dirk Paris (born 1912), Jan Govert (born 1914), Jacob Martijn (b. 1916), Janneke Caroline (b. 1919), Selinde Pietertje (b. 1920), Willem Herman (b. 1923). Roosenburg is the grandfather of Rem Koolhaas.

== Awards and recognition ==
Rosenburg was awarded the Order of Orange.

Since 1989, the Dirk Roosenburgprijs is awarded by the Architectuurcentrum Eindhoven every two years . The award is given in memory of Dirk Roosenburg for projects that have furthered the structural quality of the city within the municipal boundaries.

The Dirk Roosenburgprijs in 2015: UARCHITECTS (Misak Terzibasiyan, founder and owner) won the professional jury prize and public prize.
