= H. J. Lovink Pumping Station =

- Gemaal H. J. Lovink
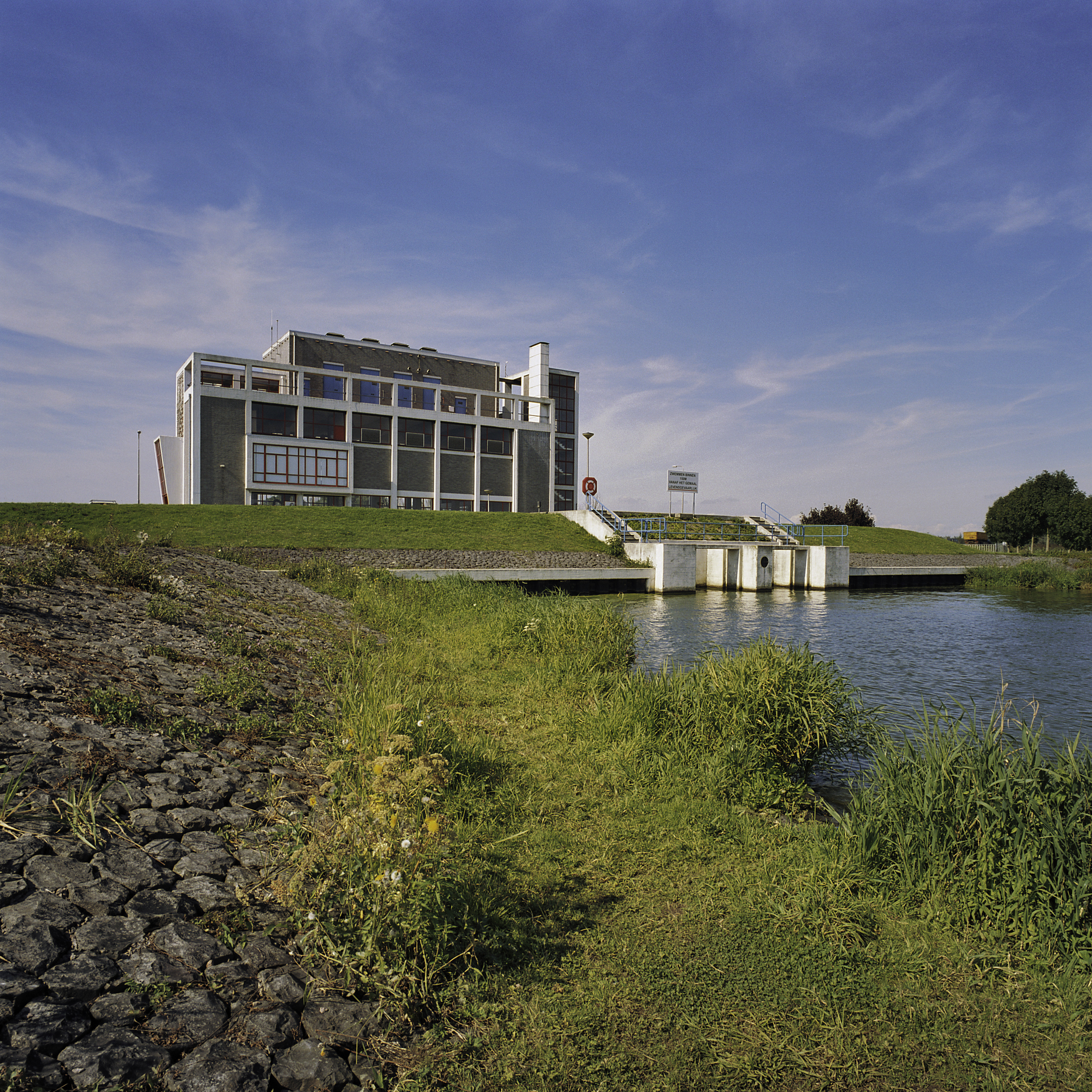
- Interactive map of the H. J. Lovink Pumping Station area

General information
- Architectural style: Modernism
- Location: Harderdijk 15, Biddinghuizen, Netherlands
- Coordinates: 52°22′16″N 5°36′54″E
- Named for: Hermanus Johannes Lovink
- Year built: 1954–1956
- Owner: Zuiderzeeland Water Authority

The H. J. Lovink Pumping Station (Dutch: Gemaal H. J. Lovink) is a pumping station in Biddinghuizen, a village in the municipality of Dronten, Flevoland, the Netherlands. Named for Hermanus Johannes Lovink, an agriculturist who was extensively involved in land reclamation, the station was designed by Dirk Roosenburg and completed in 1956. It was used for the reclamation of the eastern Flevopolder in 1957 and contributed to the reclamation of the island's southern areas. The station was designated a rijksmonument (national monument) on 13 December 2010.

== Design and layout ==
The pumping station is situated along Provincial Road N306 in the southern part of Biddinghuizen, a village in the municipality of Dronten, Flevoland, the Netherlands. It lies northeast of the 5-metre (16 ft) Lovink Lock, which connects the Dwarsvaart Canal with the Veluwemeer. The concrete inlets, protected against duckweed by a filter, transport discharge from the canal into the lake.

In design, the station consists primarily of three rectangular blocks. The largest of these, oriented horizontally, contains the engine room with two pumps. On the northwest and southeast sides of this structure, the concrete frame is connected by a series of steel-framed windows. Atop this block is a terrace, enclosed by a concrete frame, around the second horizontal block that contains the transformer; an auxiliary transformer is also located on site. The third block, oriented vertically, contains a staircase that connects the ground level with the terrace level. Windows allow views along the northwest and southeast sides.

Built on a slight incline, the south-western façade – which contains the main entrance, framed by a diagonal projection – is taller than the north-eastern façade. Above the entrance is a tableau by J. M. Roosenburg that depicts a farmer and fisherman, one landward and one seaward, shaking hands over a dyke. Titled Land en Water ("Land and Water"), this tableau consists of a series of terracotta tiles with white-glazed reliefs on a brown background. In the canal near the station is a piece of land art by Jacqueline Verhaagen, an artificial island in blue concrete titled De Blauwe Dromer ("The Blue Dreamer", 2001).

The interior of the main block contains the engine room, which holds two vertical centrifugal pumps driven by three-phase motors. These pumps remove a combined 1,160 cubic metres (41,000 cu ft) of water (1.16 million litres [260,000 imp gal; 310,000 US gal]) per minute; as of 2002, the canal is 5.2 metres (17 ft) lower than the Veluwemeer. Most of the engine room is open, showing the concrete truss construction, though an enclosed area contains a battery for the transformer as well as a diesel generator.

== History ==
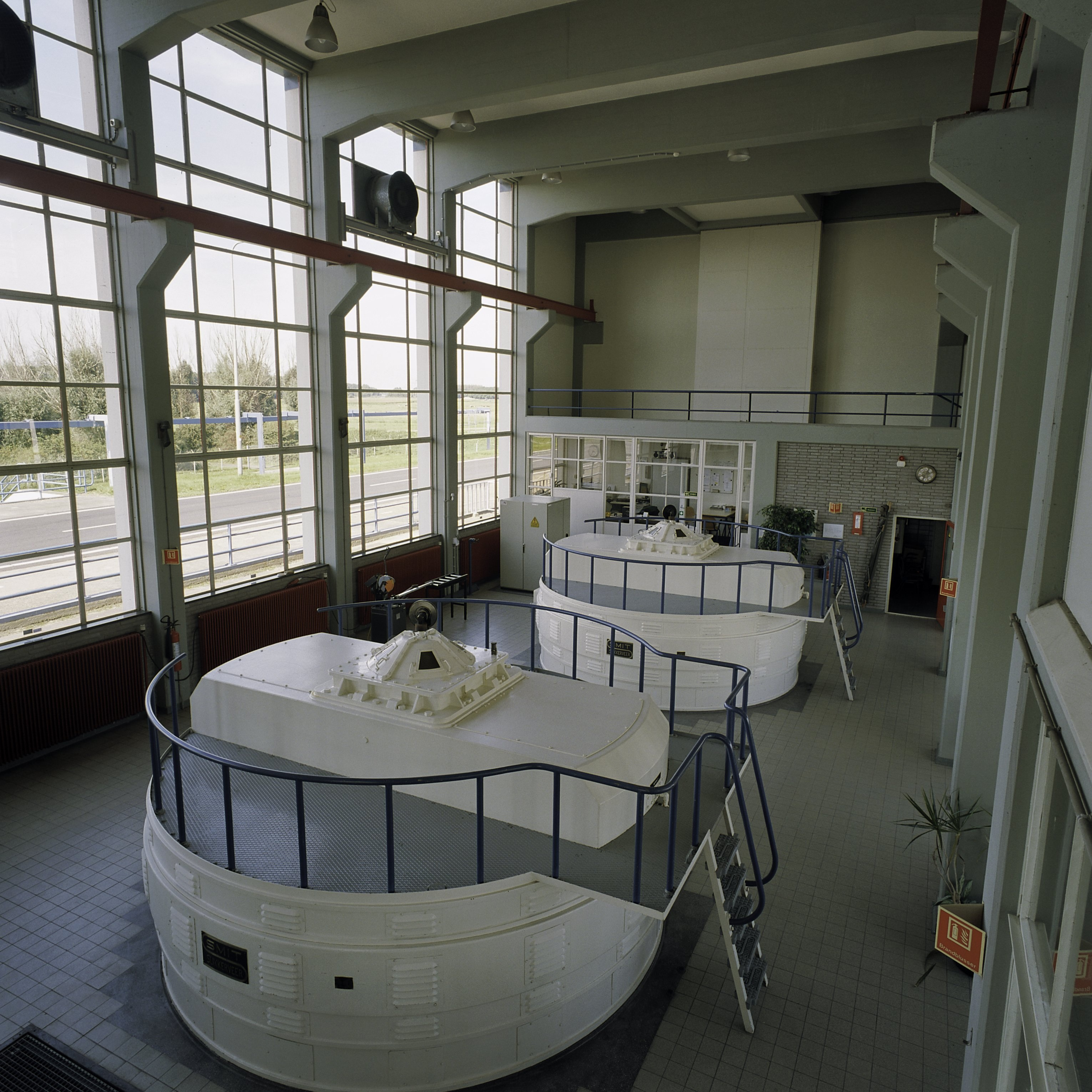
The interior of the engine room

Construction of the H. J. Lovink Pumping Station began in 1954, following a design by Dirk Roosenburg. The engines had been installed by March 1956, and operations began in September of that year. Four houses were constructed nearby, intended for two engineers, a staff member, and a road maintenance worker. The station was named for Hermanus Johannes Lovink (1866–1938), an agriculturalist who had overseen extensive land reclamation and afforestation projects as the director of the Association for Wasteland Redevelopment and as a member of the House of Representatives.

Together with the larger Colijn Pumping Station in Ketelhaven and the H. Wortman Pumping Station in Lelystad, the Lovink Station was used for the reclamation of the eastern Flevopolder, which was officially declared dry on 27 June 1957. As the region's canals are interconnected, these three stations were also used in the reclamation of the southern Flevopolder, which was achieved in 1968. Lovink Station was automated in 1991. The engines were refitted between 1993 and 1995. A new switching system was also installed during this period. In 2002, a recreational lock was built to the south of the station.

The station is currently owned and operated by the Zuiderzeeland Water Authority. It was designated a rijksmonument (national monument) on 13 December 2010. This designation was based on its historical value in the reclamation of the Flevopolder, its architectural value as an example of modernism, the artistic value of its terracotta relief, and its integrity. It was the first national monument built in the Flevopolder.

== Works cited ==
- "Gemaal H.J. Lovink" [H.J. Lovink Pumping Station]. Rijksmonumentenregister (in Dutch). Ministry of Education, Culture and Science. Archived from the original on 10 December 2023.
- "Gemaal Lovink" [Lovink Pumping Station]. Flevoland Heritage (in Dutch). Fleurbaaij Kunst & Cultuur. Archived from the original on 27 September 2023.
- "Gemaal Lovink" [Lovink Pumping Station] (in Dutch). Zuiderzeeland Water Authority. 26 May 2020. Archived from the original on 8 June 2024.
- "Gemaal-Lovink moet alleen nog 'aangekleed' worden" [Lovink Pumping Station needs only to be 'dressed']. 't Nieuws voor Kampen (in Dutch). Kampen. 31 March 1956. p. 4.
- "Gemaal Lovink" (Map). Google Maps.
- "Lovink" (in Dutch). Netherlands Pumping Station Foundation. Archived from the original on 9 June 2024.
- Poel, JMG van der (12 November 2013). "Lovink, Hermanus Johannes (1866–1938)" (in Dutch). Huygens Institute for the History of the Netherlands. Archived from the original on 8 June 2024.
