= Governor-General of the Dutch East Indies =

Dutch vice-regal title and position

- Gouverneur-generaal van Nederlandsch-Indië
- Coat of arms of the Dutch East Indies

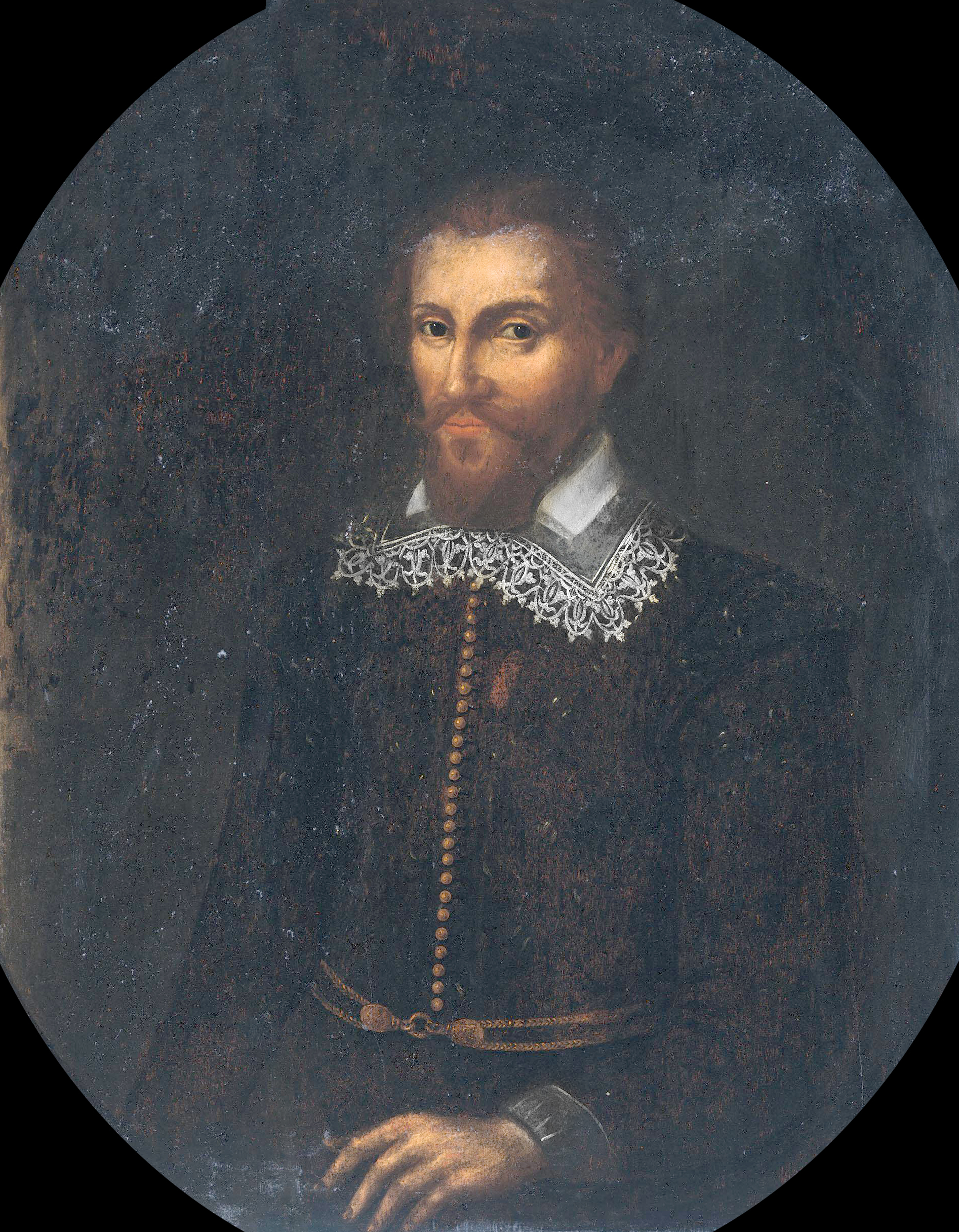
- First holder; Pieter Both; 19 December 1610 – 6 November 1614
- Residence: Paleis te Koningsplein; Paleis te Rijswijk
- Seat: Batavia
- Appointer: Dutch East India Company (1610–1800); Dutch government (1800–1949)
- Formation: 19 December 1610 (415 years ago)
- First holder: Pieter Both
- Final holder: Tony Lovink
- Abolished: 27 December 1949 (76 years ago)
- Succession: President of Indonesia

The governor-general of the Dutch East Indies (Dutch: Gouverneur-generaal van Nederlands Indië, Indonesian: Gubernur Jenderal Hindia Belanda) represented Dutch rule in the Dutch East Indies between 1610 and Dutch recognition of the independence of Indonesia in 1949. (Note: Occupied by Japanese forces between 1942 and 1945, followed by the Indonesian National Revolution until 1949. Indonesia proclaimed its independence on 17 August 1945.)

== History ==
The first governors-general were appointed by the Dutch East India Company (VOC). After the VOC was formally dissolved in 1800, the territorial possessions of the VOC were nationalised under the Dutch government as the Dutch East Indies, a colony of the Netherlands. Governors-general were now appointed by either the Dutch monarch or the Dutch government. During the Dutch East Indies era most governors-general were expatriate Dutchmen, while during the earlier VOC era most governors-general became settlers who stayed and died in the East Indies.

Under the period of British control (1811–1816), the equivalent position was the lieutenant-governor, of whom the most notable is Thomas Stamford Raffles. Between 1942 and 1945, while Hubertus Johannes van Mook was the nominal governor-general, the area was under Japanese control, and was governed by a two sequence of governors, in Java and Sumatra. After 1948, during the negotiations for independence, the equivalent position was named High Commissioner of the Crown in the Dutch East Indies.

== Position of governor-general ==
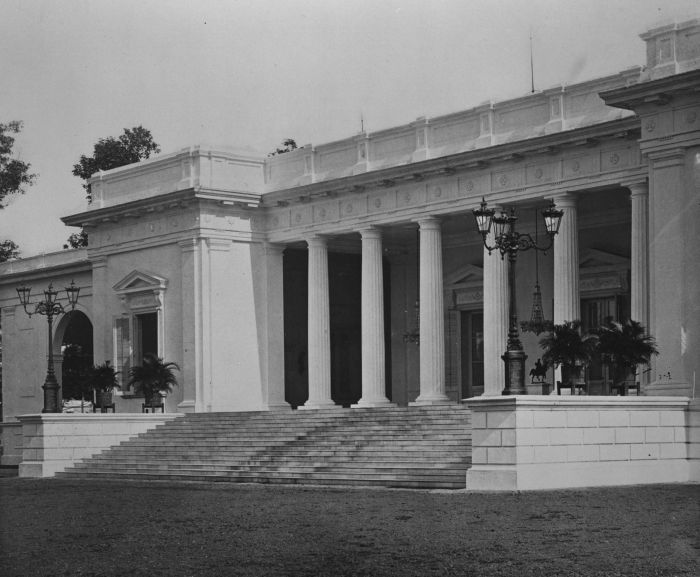
Governor-general's palace in Batavia in c. 1880–1900

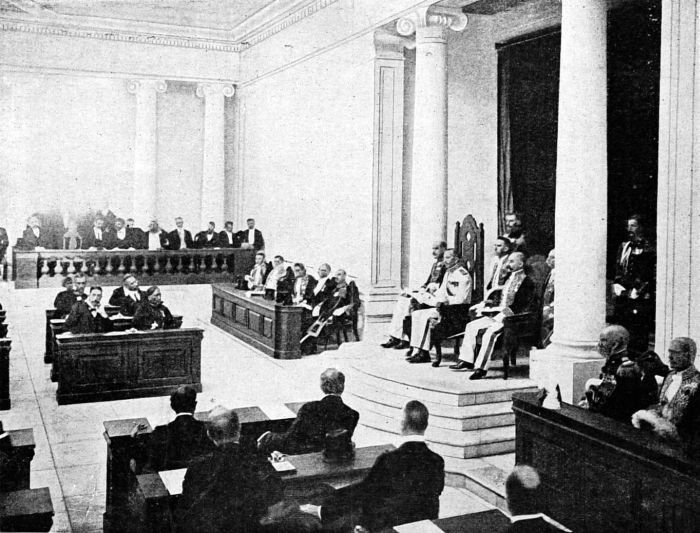
Opening of the Volksraad by Governor-general count of Limburg Stirum in Batavia on 18 May 1918

Since the VOC era, the highest Dutch authority in the colonial possessions of the East Indies resided with the office of the governor-general. During the Dutch East Indies era the governor-general functioned as colonial chief executive, president of colonial government, as well as commander-in-chief of the colonial (KNIL) army. Until 1903 all government officials and organisations were formal agents of the governor-general and entirely dependent on the central administration of the office of the governor-general for their budgets.

A governor-general represented the Dutch Empire and monarch and was the most influential party in the colony. Until 1815 the governor-general had the absolute right to ban, censor or restrict any publication in the colony. The so-called exorbitant powers of the governor-general allowed him to exile anyone regarded as subversive and dangerous to peace and order, without involving any court of law.

Until 1848 the governor-general was directly appointed by the Dutch monarch, and in later years via the crown on advice of the Dutch metropolitan cabinet. During two periods (1815–1835 and 1854–1925) the governor-general ruled jointly with an advisory board called the Raad van Indie (Indies Council), which were jointly referred to as the high government.

Overall colonial policy and strategy were the responsibility of the Ministry of Colonies based in The Hague, often headed by a former governor-general. From 1815 to 1848 the ministry was under direct authority of the Dutch monarch. In the 20th century the colony gradually developed as a state distinct from the Dutch metropole with treasury separated in 1903, public loans being contracted by the colony from 1913, and quasi-diplomatic ties were established with Arabia to manage the Haji pilgrimage from the Dutch East Indies. In 1922 the colony came on equal footing with the Netherlands in the Dutch constitution, while remaining under the Ministry of Colonies.

During the tenure of governors-general who were proponents of the ethical policy a people's council called the Volksraad for the Dutch East Indies was installed in 1918. The Volksraad, an infant form of democratic council, was limited to an advisory role and only a small portion of the population were able to vote for its members. The council comprised 30 indigenous members, 25 European and 5 from Chinese and other populations, and was reconstituted every four years. In 1925 the Volksraad was made a semilegislative body; and the governor-general was expected to consult the Volksraad on major issues.

== See also ==
- List of governors of the Dutch East Indies
