= 1907–1908 Dutch cabinet formation =

Formation of the Theo Heemskerk cabinet

A process of cabinet formation took place in the Netherlands after the De Meester cabinet offered its resignation on 24 December 1907. The formation resulted in the Theo Heemskerk cabinet on 12 February 1908. It was the third coalition cabinet, because it consisted of the Catholics, the Anti-Revolutionary Party (ARP) and supported by the Christian Historical Union (CHU).

== Background ==
The De Meester cabinet was a liberal minority cabinet that took office in 1905. In early 1907, the cabinet crisis over the war budget arose after the budget of Minister of War Henri Staal was rejected. In particular, the confessional opposition opposed the proposed cuts. The cabinet offered its resignation, but withdrew this after the cabinet formation early that year. Staal was replaced as minister by Willem Frederik van Rappard.

Van Rappard made a number of blunders soon after taking office and continued the cuts. There was therefore a lot of criticism during the budget discussion. The opposition was led by the anti-revolutionary faction leader Theo Heemskerk and was supported by a number of liberals. However, the social democrats and free-thinking liberals were disappointed in the lack of cuts. It led to a hesitant Van Rappard and an inadequate defence of the budget. On 21 December 1907, the budget was rejected by a majority of 41 confessionals, seven social democrats and five liberals. Three days later, the cabinet offered its collective resignation and continued in a demissionary capacity.

== Consultations ==
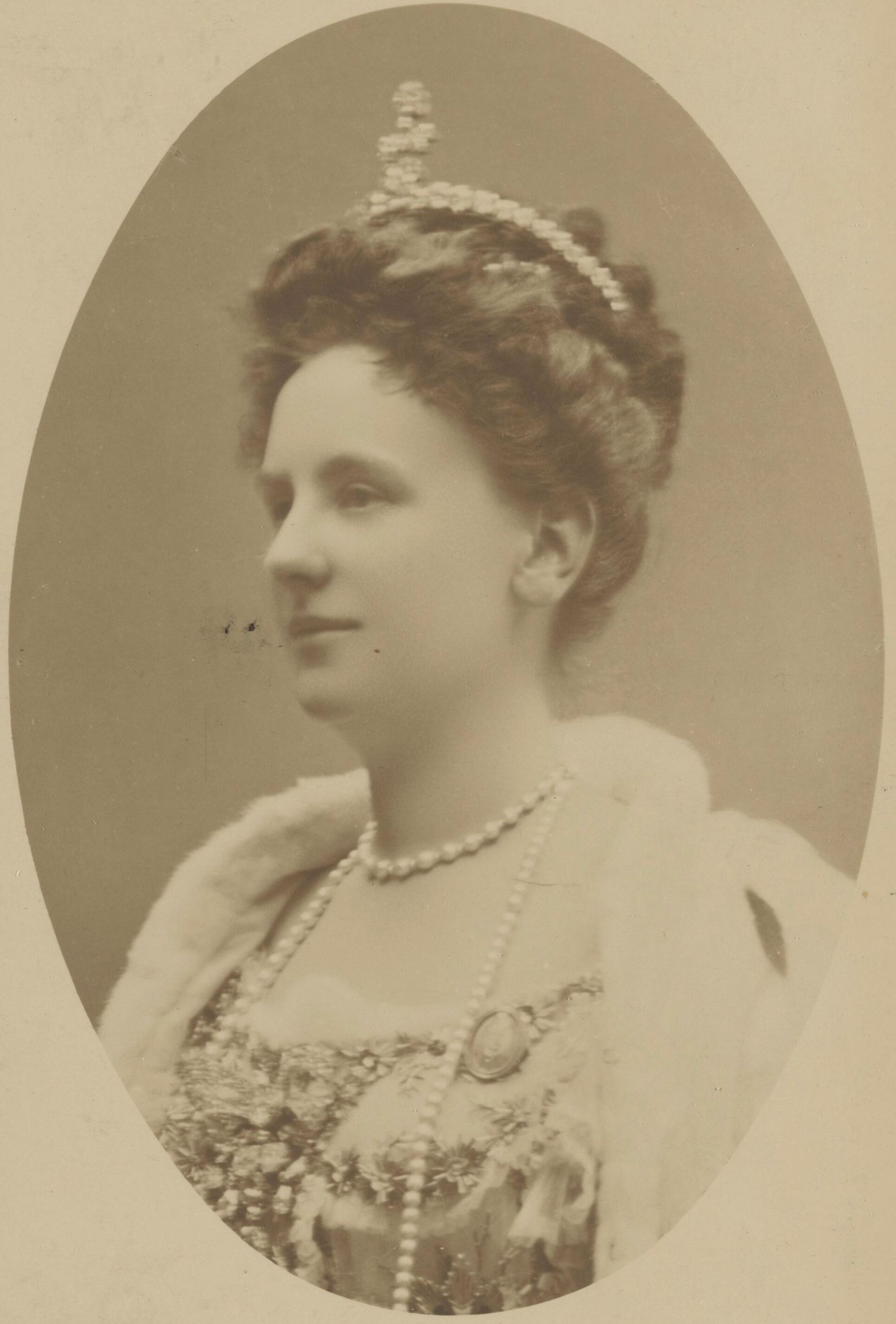
Portrait of Wilhelmina in 1908.

After the dismissal of the cabinet, it was Queen Wilhelmina's turn. She had a bad relationship with the De Meester cabinet, and had tried to form a mixed cabinet during both the cabinet formation of 1905 and in 1907. She was particularly against military cuts. She therefore wanted a confessional cabinet this time.

Wilhelmina had already received CHU faction leader Alexander de Savornin Lohman for advice on 23 December. Her official advisors followed suit on 27 December; the liberal Speaker of the House of Representatives Joan Röell and the Christian historical Speaker of the Senate Jan Elias Nicolaas Schimmelpenninck van der Oye and vice-president of the Council of State Petrus Johannes van Swinderen. All four saw the De Meester cabinet as out of control. Lohman, Schimmelpenninck and Röell recommended a confessional cabinet and Heemskerk as formateur. Van Swinderen preferred a technocratic cabinet until the periodic 1909 general election. If that did not work, someone from the denominational side had to become a formateur.

An important question was how to deal with Abraham Kuyper, party leader of the ARP and former Prime Minister in the previous coalition cabinet, the Kuyper cabinet. Wilhelmina did not find him sympathetic and was against his polarising antithesis. Kuyper himself wanted to return as Prime Minister. For this purpose, Kuyper thought it would be best if the De Meester cabinet was glued together, after which he could form a cabinet again after the 1909 elections. Lohman indicated to Wilhelmina that Kuyper would stir up resistance and unite the divided left-wing parties again in opposition to a cabinet under his leadership. Kuyper was no longer a Member of Parliament, so according to Lohman he did not need to be consulted.

On 30 December, Wilhelmina received Heemskerk to whom she offered the formateurship. Heemskerk was surprised and asked for unspecified time for consultation with other politicians. Wilhelmina discussed eleven more points with Heemskerk that the formateur had to take into account. This mainly concerned military matters, but also the continuation of the Aceh policy of General Jo van Heutsz and the request to appoint a diplomat to the Ministry of Foreign Affairs. The cabinet would have to continue to cherish a conciliatory approach, which required avoiding 'politics of extremes', referring to Kuyper.

=== Convincing Kuyper ===
Immediately after the visit to Wilhelmina, Heemskerk visited Kuyper, whose cooperation as party leader was required. The relationship between the two had not been cordial since Heemskerk had refused to join Kuyper's cabinet during the formation of 1901. The conversation was difficult. Kuyper saw his political career cut short by Wilhelmina's proposal and threatened to resign as party chairman.

Heemskerk informed the confessional factions of the conversation with Wilhelmina. He formed a coalition meeting with his party secretary Syb Talma, vice-chairman Jan Hendrik de Waal Malefijt and with the Catholic faction leader Maximilien Joseph Caspar Marie Kolkman and the Catholic former minister Jan Loeff. Heemskerk also had direct contact with Lohman on behalf of the Christian-historical faction, which was positive about a commission for Heemskerk.

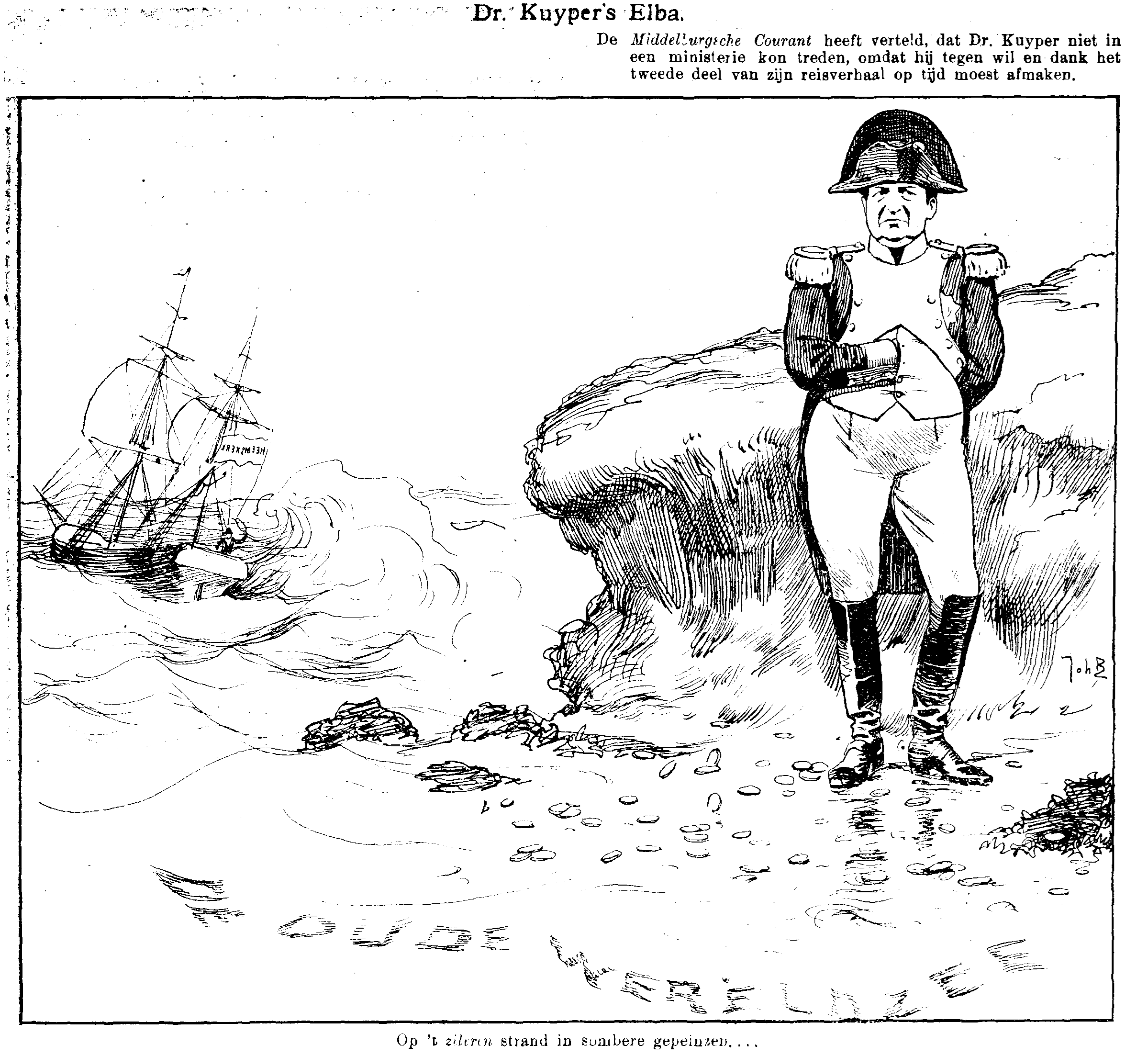
Cartoon by Johan Braakensiek from De Amsterdammer from 26 January 1908. Kuyper dressed as Napoleon Bonaparte is left behind on Elba by a ship with the flag "Heemskerk".

In order for Kuyper to show his true colors, the coalition council agreed to write to Kuyper that Heemskerk would advise Wilhelmina to appoint Kuyper as formateur. Heemskerk indicated in the letter of 6 January that he could only be a formateur with the full consent of the Anti-Revolutionary Party. The transparent offer and formulations caused bad blood with Kuyper, after which a discussion followed with Heemskerk on 8 January.

Kuyper was ultimately prepared to support Heemskerk, on the condition that Wilhelmina would summon Kuyper so that it did not appear to the outside world that he was being passed over. Because relations between Wilhelmina and Kuyper were bad, it was proposed to summon all three confessional party leaders. Another demand was that the resulting cabinet would resign after the 1909 elections. The cabinet could then be continued if it had a majority, but then Kuyper had to be added to the ministerial team. The latter was unacceptable to Heemskerk. After an angry reaction from Heemskerk, Kuyper weakened this demand.

At Heemskerk's insistence, Wilhelmina received the party leaders on 10 January, with Lohman and Kolkman merely coming for form so that Kuyper could be summoned. The directed conversation went as Wilhelmina and Heemskerk wanted. Kuyper reiterated his position that the left should actually form first, but that otherwise Heemskerk should be appointed as formateur of the right-wing cabinet. He spoke less emphatically about the situation after 1909. Afterwards, Kuyper confirmed in writing what he had said orally, but seemed to go back on it in a letter to Heemskerk. This was followed by an escalation between Heemskerk and Kuyper about the previous points. After a number of days and mediation by the coalition deliberation, Kuyper finally agreed on 15 January. Wilhelmina asked for a report signed by the coalition council of the last two days of consultations.

== Formateur Heemskerk ==
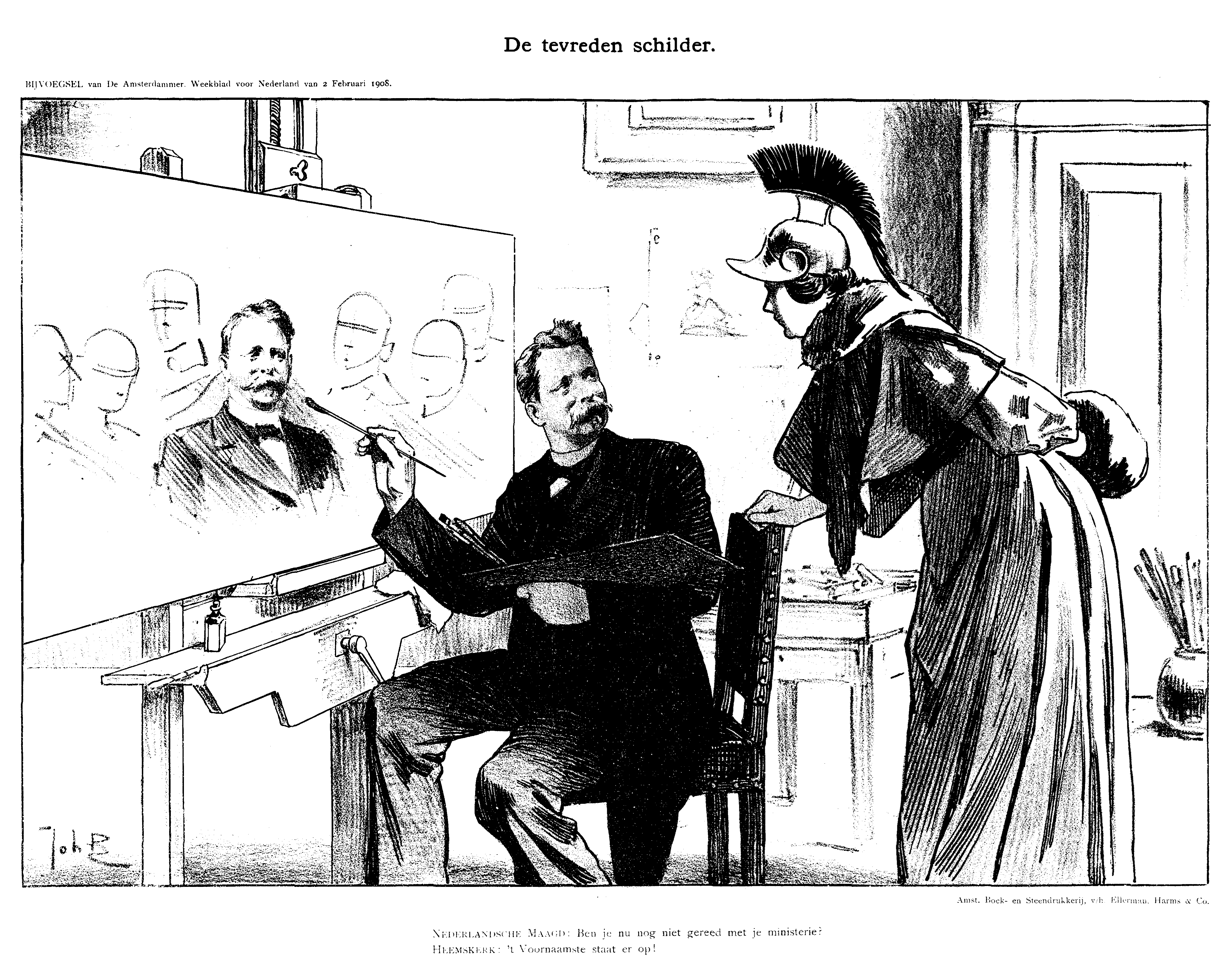
Cartoon by Johan Braakensiek from De Amsterdammer from 2 February 1908. Heemskerk paints his cabinet on the canvas, but only his head is further than sketches.

On 16 January, Heemskerk finally accepted the formateur assignment. For the government programme, they discussed improving the army and withdrawing the suffrage proposal of the De Meester cabinet. Heemskerk immediately presented the candidate ministers. On behalf of the anti-revolutionaries, he had himself (Interior), the progressive Talma (Agriculture, Commerce and Industry) and Kuypers confidant Alexander Willem Frederik Idenburg (Colonies) in mind. The political core was supplemented by the Catholics Loeff (Justice), Kolkman (Finance) and Jean Gustave Stanislas Bevers (Water Management). The independents René de Marees van Swinderen (Foreign Affairs), Frederik Henri Alexander Sabron (War) and Abraham George Ellis (Navy) completed his proposal.

Heemskerk initially had difficulty persuading the Catholic ministers. Loeff declined for medical reasons, but recommended Antonius Petrus Laurentius Nelissen. Bevers, Nelissen and Kolkman had objections, but were ultimately persuaded by Heemskerk. Heemskerk managed to persuade Talma despite some reservations. Returning governor of Suriname Idenburg to the office he held until 1905 proved more difficult. Mediation by Wilhelmina eventually convinced Idenburg, on the condition that he did not have to start until May to regain his strength first.

On Wilhelmina's recommendation, Heemskerk first consulted former Minister of War Arthur Kool before approaching a prospective Minister of War. Kool approached Sabron on behalf of Heemskerk, but he refused. Heemskerk then approached him himself, but Sabron again refused. Ultimately, however, the queen persuaded him. Ellis resigned as Secretary of the Navy due to heart problems. Ellis suggested A.H. Hoekwater, who initially accepted but who suffered a nervous breakdown and then decided against it for health reasons. On Hoekwater's advice, Heemskerk then approached the incumbent Minister of the Navy Jan Wentholt, a non-partisan liberal, who they learned wanted to continue.

The last remaining vacancy was that of Minister of Foreign Affairs. Lohman initially recommended the envoy in Washington, D.C., De Marees van Swinderen, but changed his mind and with him Heemskerk. Lohman then ordered the Secretary General of the Permanent Court of Arbitration Leonard Henri Ruyssenaers, but he declined for health reasons. Lohman came up with two more recommendations, Frederik van Bylandt and Willem Marcus van Weede van Berencamp, while Heemskerk focused on former Minister of Water Management Johannes Christiaan de Marez Oyens. In the end De Marees got Van Swinderen, who happened to arrive in the Netherlands. On 7 February, he accepted the ministership and the cabinet was complete.

On 8 February, Heemskerk wrote to Wilhelmina about the appointments and the government programme. Heemskerk was sworn in on 11 February, followed by the other ministers a day later. Only Idenburg was not sworn in until 20 May, so Heemskerk took over the Ministry of the Colonies until then.

== Aftermath ==
The Theo Heemskerk cabinet obtained a majority in the House of Representatives after the 1909 general election. The cabinet remained in place until the 1913 general election, making it the longest-serving Dutch cabinet to date.
