= Theo Heemskerk cabinet =

Cabinet of the Netherlands, 1908 to 1913

- Cabinet of the Netherlands
- Date formed: 12 February 1908
- Date dissolved: 29 August 1913 (Demissionary from 26 June 1913)

People and organisations
- Head of state: Queen Wilhelmina
- Head of government: Theo Heemskerk
- No. of ministers: 9
- Ministers removed: 7
- Total no. of members: 14
- Member party: 12 February 1908 – 27 July 1909 Anti-Revolutionary Party; General League Independent Catholics; Independent Protestants (Confidence and supply) 27 July 1909 – 29 August 1913 Anti-Revolutionary Party; General League
- Status in legislature: Centre-right Minority government (12 February 1908 – 27 July 1909); Centre-right Majority government (27 July 1909 – 29 August 1913)

History
- Incoming formation: 1907-1908
- Outgoing formation: 1913
- Election: 1909 election
- Outgoing election: 1913 election
- Legislature terms: 1905–1909; 1909–1913
- Predecessor: De Meester cabinet
- Successor: Cort van der Linden cabinet

The Theo Heemskerk cabinet was the cabinet of the Netherlands from 12 February 1908 until 29 August 1913. The cabinet was formed by the political party Anti-Revolutionary Party (ARP) and the General League of Roman Catholic Electoral Associations (AB) following the fall of the De Meester cabinet 21 December 1907. The centre-right cabinet was a minority government in the House of Representatives but was supported by Independent Catholics and Independent Protestants for a majority. After the election of 1909 the Anti-Revolutionary Party and the General League of Roman Catholic Electoral Associations received a plurality of the votes and the cabinet could continued to govern as a majority government from 27 July 1909. Theo Heemskerk of the Anti-Revolutionary Party was Prime Minister.

== Composition ==
Composition
Title	Minister			Term of office	
Title	Image	Name	Party	Start	End
Chairman of the Council of Ministers; Minister of the Interior	Theo Heemskerk	Theo Heemskerk	ARP	12 February 1908	29 August 1913
Minister of Foreign Affairs	René de Marees van Swinderen	René de Marees van Swinderen	Indep.	12 February 1908	29 August 1913
Minister of Finance	Maximilien Kolkman	Maximilien Joseph Caspar Marie Kolkman	General League	12 February 1908	29 August 1913
Minister of Justice	Anton Nelissen	Anton Nelissen	General League	12 February 1908	11 May 1910
Minister of Justice	Theo Heemskerk	Theo Heemskerk (ad interim)	ARP	11 May 1910	7 June 1910
Minister of Justice	Robert Regout	Robert Regout	General League	7 June 1910	18 January 1913
Minister of Justice	Theo Heemskerk	Theo Heemskerk (ad interim)	ARP	18 January 1913	29 August 1913
Minister of Agriculture, Commerce and Industry	Syb Talma	Syb Talma	ARP	12 February 1908	29 August 1913
Minister of War	Frederik Sabron	Frederik Sabron	Indep.	12 February 1908	27 July 1909
Minister of War	Wouter Cool	Wouter Cool	Indep.	27 July 1909	4 January 1911
Minister of War	Hendrikus Colijn	Hendrikus Colijn	ARP	4 January 1911	29 August 1913
Minister of the Navy	Jan Wentholt	Jan Wentholt	Indep. (Note: Liberal)	12 February 1908	14 May 1912
Minister of the Navy	Hendrikus Colijn	Hendrikus Colijn	ARP	14 May 1912	29 August 1913
Minister of Water Management	Jean Bevers	Jean Bevers	General League	12 February 1908	5 January 1909
Minister of Water Management	Syb Talma	Syb Talma (ad interim)	ARP	5 January 1909	21 January 1909
Minister of Water Management	Louis Regout	Louis Regout	General League	21 January 1909	29 August 1913
Minister of Colonial Affairs	Theo Heemskerk	Theo Heemskerk (ad interim)	ARP	12 February 1908	20 May 1908
Minister of Colonial Affairs	Alexander Idenburg	Alexander Idenburg	ARP	20 May 1908	16 August 1909
Minister of Colonial Affairs	Jan Hendrik de Waal Malefijt	Jan Hendrik de Waal Malefijt	ARP	16 August 1909	29 August 1913
