= List of ministers of infrastructure of the Netherlands =

Minister of Infrastructure and Water Management of the Netherlands
- Minister van Infrastructuur en Waterstaat
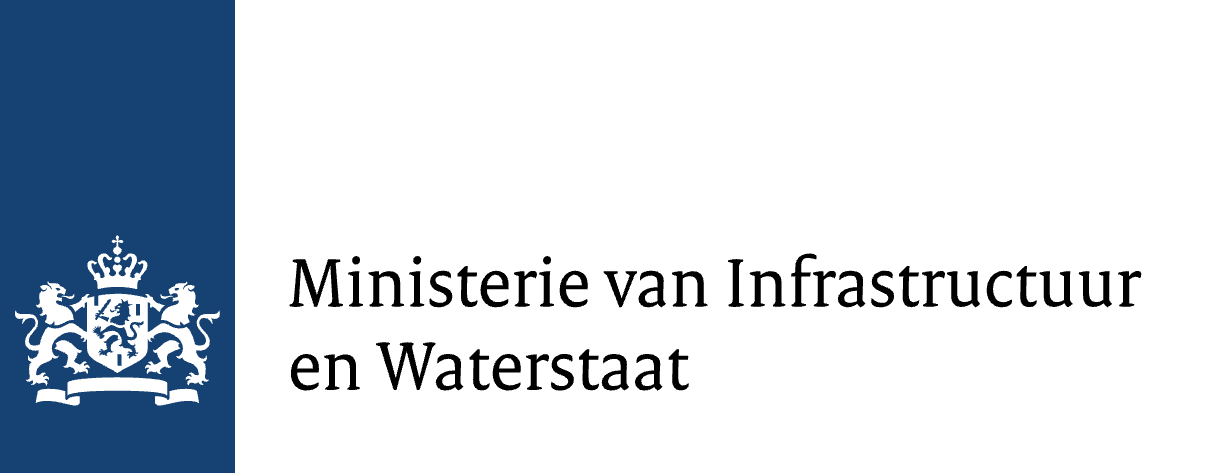

- Flag of the Kingdom of the Netherlands
- Ministry of Infrastructure and Water Management
- Style: His/Her Excellency
- Member of: Council of Ministers
- Appointer: The monarch; on advice of the prime minister
- First holder: Adriaan Twent van Raaphorst as Minister of Water Management 27 May 1809; 217 years ago Steef van Schaik as Minister of Transport; 25 June 1945; 81 years ago Hein Vos as Minister of Transport and Water Management; 1 March 1947; 79 years ago Melanie Schultz van Haegen as Minister of Infrastructure; 14 October 2010; 15 years ago
- Salary: €205,991 (As of 2025)

The minister of infrastructure and water management (Dutch: Minister van Infrastructuur en Waterstaat) is the head of the Ministry of Infrastructure and Water Management and a member of the Cabinet and the Council of Ministers. Regularly, a state secretary is assigned to the ministry who is tasked with specific portfolios.

== List of ministers of infrastructure ==
Minister of Water Management, Commerce and Industry		Term of office	Party	Cabinet
Johannes Tak van Poortvliet	Johannes Tak van Poortvliet (1839–1904)	3 November 1877 – 20 August 1879	Independent (Liberal)	Kappeyne van de Coppello
	Jonkheer; Guillaume Klerck (1825–1884)	20 August 1879 – 23 April 1883	Independent (Conservative liberal)	Van Lynden van Sandenburg
Johannes van den Bergh	Johannes van den Bergh (1824–1890)	23 April 1883 – 10 June 1887^{[Res]}	Independent (Conservative Catholic)	J. Heemskerk
Frederik Cornelis Tromp	Frederik Cornelis Tromp (Minister of the Navy) (1828–1900)	10 June 1887 – 11 July 1887^{[Ad interim]}	Independent (Conservative liberal)	J. Heemskerk
Jacob Bastert	Jacob Bastert (1826–1902)	11 July 1887 – 21 April 1888	Independent (Conservative liberal)	J. Heemskerk
Jacob Havelaar	Jacob Havelaar (1840–1918)	21 April 1888 – 21 August 1891	Anti-Revolutionary Party	Mackay
Cornelis Lely	Cornelis Lely (1854–1929)	21 August 1891 – 9 May 1894	Liberal Union	Van Tienhoven
Philippe van der Sleijden	Philippe van der Sleijden (1842–1923)	9 May 1894 – 27 July 1897	Independent (Old liberal)	Röell
Cornelis Lely	Cornelis Lely (1854–1929)	27 July 1897 – 1 August 1901	Liberal Union	Pierson
Johannes Christiaan de Marez Oyens	Johannes Christiaan de Marez Oyens (1845–1911)	1 August 1901 – 17 August 1905	Anti-Revolutionary Party	Kuyper
Jacob Kraus	Jacob Kraus (1861–1951)	17 August 1905 – 1 July 1906	Liberal Union	De Meester
Minister of Water Management		Term of office	Party	Cabinet
Jacob Kraus	Jacob Kraus (1861–1951)	1 July 1906 – 12 February 1908	Liberal Union	De Meester
Jean Bevers	Jean Bevers (1852–1909)	12 February 1908 – 5 January 1909^{[Died]}	General League	T. Heemskerk
Syb Talma	Syb Talma (Minister of Agriculture, Industry and Commerce) (1864–1916)	5 January 1909 – 21 January 1909^{[Ad interim]}	Anti-Revolutionary Party	T. Heemskerk
Louis Regout	Louis Regout (1861–1915)	21 January 1909 – 29 August 1913	General League	T. Heemskerk
Cornelis Lely	Cornelis Lely (1854–1929)	29 August 1913 – 9 September 1918	Liberal Union	Cort van der Linden
Adrianus König	Adrianus König (1867–1944)	9 September 1918 – 18 September 1922	Roman Catholic; State Party	Ruijs de Beerenbrouck I
Gerard van Swaay	Gerard van Swaay (1867–1945)	18 September 1922 – 4 August 1925	Roman Catholic; State Party	Ruijs de Beerenbrouck II
Max Bongaerts	Max Bongaerts (1875–1959)	4 August 1925 – 8 March 1926	Roman Catholic; State Party	Colijn I
Hendrik van der Vegte	Hendrik van der Vegte (1868–1933)	8 March 1926 – 10 August 1929	Anti-Revolutionary Party	De Geer I
Paul Reymer	Paul Reymer (1882–1952)	10 August 1929 – 26 May 1933	Roman Catholic; State Party	Ruijs de Beerenbrouck III
Jacob Kalff	Jacob Kalff (1869–1935)	26 May 1933 – 13 January 1935^{[Died]}	Liberal State Party	Colijn II
Hendrikus Colijn	Hendrikus Colijn (Prime Minister) (1869–1944)	13 January 1935 – 15 March 1935^{[Ad interim]}	Anti-Revolutionary Party	Colijn II
Otto van Lidth de Jeude	Jonkheer; Otto van Lidth de Jeude (1881–1952)	15 March 1935 – 24 June 1937	Liberal State Party	Colijn II
Otto van Lidth de Jeude	Jonkheer; Otto van Lidth de Jeude (1881–1952)	15 March 1935 – 24 June 1937	Liberal State Party	Colijn III
Johan van Buuren	Johan van Buuren (1884–1970)	24 June 1937 – 25 July 1939	Independent (Liberal)	Colijn IV
Otto van Lidth de Jeude	Jonkheer; Otto van Lidth de Jeude (1881–1952)	25 July 1939 – 10 August 1939	Liberal State Party	Colijn V
Willem Albarda	Willem Albarda (also Minister of Finance; 1941–1942) (1877–1957)	10 August 1939 – 23 February 1945	Social Democratic; Workers' Party	De Geer II
Willem Albarda	Willem Albarda (also Minister of Finance; 1941–1942) (1877–1957)	10 August 1939 – 23 February 1945	Social Democratic; Workers' Party	Gerbrandy I • II
Frans Wijffels	Frans Wijffels (Minister of Social Affairs) (1899–1968)	23 February 1945 – 4 April 1945^{[Ad interim]}	Roman Catholic; State Party	Gerbrandy III
Theo Tromp	Theo Tromp (1903–1984)	4 April 1945 – 25 June 1945	Independent; Liberal (Classical Liberal)	Gerbrandy III

Minister of Transport and Energy		Term of office	Party	Cabinet
Steef van Schaik	Steef van Schaik (1888–1968)	25 June 1945 – 3 July 1946	Roman Catholic; State Party	Willem; Schermerhorn (Schermerhorn– Drees)
Steef van Schaik	Steef van Schaik (1888–1968)	25 June 1945 – 3 July 1946	Catholic; People's Party	Willem; Schermerhorn (Schermerhorn– Drees)
Minister of Transport		Term of office	Party	Cabinet
Hein Vos	Hein Vos (1903–1972)	3 July 1946 – 1 March 1947	Labour Party	Beel I
Minister of Transport and Water Management		Term of office	Party	Cabinet
Hein Vos	Hein Vos (1903–1972)	1 March 1947 – 7 August 1948	Labour Party	Beel I
Josef van Schaik	Josef van Schaik (1882–1962)^{[Deputy]}	7 August 1948 – 1 November 1948^{[Acting]} ^{[Minister]}	Catholic; People's Party	Drees– Van Schaik
Derk Spitzen	Derk Spitzen (1896–1957)	1 November 1948 – 15 March 1951	Independent; Christian Democratic; Protestant	Drees– Van Schaik
Hendrik Wemmers	Hendrik Wemmers (1897–1983)	15 March 1951 – 2 September 1952	Independent; Christian Democratic; Protestant	Drees I
Jacob Algera	Jacob Algera (1902–1966)	2 September 1952 – 10 October 1958^{[Res]}	Anti-Revolutionary; Party	Drees II
Jacob Algera	Jacob Algera (1902–1966)	2 September 1952 – 10 October 1958^{[Res]}	Anti-Revolutionary; Party	Drees III
Herman Witte	Herman Witte (1909–1973)	10 October 1958 – 1 November 1958^{[Ad Interim]} ^{[Minister]}	Catholic; People's Party	Drees III
Jan van Aartsen	Jan van Aartsen (1909–1992)	1 November 1958 – 19 May 1959	Anti-Revolutionary; Party	Drees III
Jan van Aartsen	Jan van Aartsen (1909–1992)	1 November 1958 – 19 May 1959	Anti-Revolutionary; Party	Beel II
Henk Korthals	Henk Korthals (1911–1976)^{[Deputy]}	19 May 1959 – 24 July 1963^{[Minister]}	People's Party for Freedom and Democracy	De Quay
Jan van Aartsen	Jan van Aartsen (1909–1992)	24 July 1963 – 14 April 1965	Anti-Revolutionary; Party	Marijnen
Ko Suurhoff	Ko Suurhoff (1905–1967)	14 April 1965 – 1 May 1966^{[Note]}	Labour Party	Cals
Pieter Bogaers	Pieter Bogaers (1924–2008)	1 May 1966 – 30 June 1966^{[Acting]} ^{[Minister]}	Catholic; People's Party	Cals
Ko Suurhoff	Ko Suurhoff (1905–1967)	30 June 1966 – 22 November 1966	Labour Party	Cals
Jan de Quay	Jan de Quay (1901–1985)^{[Deputy]}	22 November 1966 – 5 April 1967	Catholic; People's Party	Zijlstra
Joop Bakker	Joop Bakker (1921–2003)^{[Deputy]}	5 April 1967 – 6 July 1971^{[Minister]}	People's Party for Freedom and Democracy	De Jong
Willem Drees Jr.	Willem Drees Jr. (1922–1998)	6 July 1971 – 21 July 1972^{[Res]}	Democratic; Socialists '70	Biesheuvel I
Willem Drees Jr.	Willem Drees Jr. (1922–1998)	6 July 1971 – 21 July 1972^{[Res]}	Democratic; Socialists '70	Biesheuvel II
Bé Udink	Bé Udink (1926–2016)	21 July 1972 – 11 May 1973^{[Minister]}	Christian; Historical Union	Biesheuvel II
Tjerk Westerterp	Tjerk Westerterp (1930–2023)	11 May 1973 – 19 December 1977	Catholic; People's Party	Den Uyl
Dany Tuijnman	Dany Tuijnman (1915–1992)	19 December 1977 – 11 September 1981	People's Party for Freedom and Democracy	Van Agt I
Henk Zeevalking	Henk Zeevalking (1922–2005)	11 September 1981 – 4 November 1982	Democrats 66	Van Agt II • III
Neelie Kroes	Neelie Kroes (born 1941)	4 November 1982 – 7 November 1989	People's Party for Freedom and Democracy	Lubbers I • II
Hanja Maij-Weggen	Hanja; Maij-Weggen (born 1943)	7 November 1989 – 16 July 1994^{[Res]}	Christian; Democratic; Appeal	Lubbers III
Koos Andriessen	Koos Andriessen (1928–2019)	16 July 1994 – 22 August 1994^{[Acting]} ^{[Minister]}	Christian; Democratic; Appeal	Lubbers III
Annemarie Jorritsma	Annemarie; Jorritsma (born 1950)	22 August 1994 – 3 August 1998	People's Party for Freedom and Democracy	Kok I
Tineke Netelenbos	Tineke Netelenbos (born 1944)	3 August 1998 – 22 July 2002	Labour Party	Kok II
Roelf de Boer	Roelf de Boer (born 1944)^{[Deputy]}	22 July 2002 – 27 May 2003	Pim Fortuyn List	Balkenende I
Karla Peijs	Karla Peijs (born 1944)	27 May 2003 – 22 February 2007	Christian; Democratic; Appeal	Balkenende II • III
Camiel Eurlings	Camiel Eurlings (born 1973)	22 February 2007 – 14 October 2010	Christian; Democratic; Appeal	Balkenende IV
Minister of Infrastructure and the Environment		Term of office	Party	Cabinet
Melanie Schultz van Haegen	Melanie Schultz van Haegen (born 1970)	14 October 2010 – 26 October 2017	People's Party for Freedom and Democracy	Rutte I • II
Minister of Infrastructure and Water Management		Term of office	Party	Cabinet
Cora van Nieuwenhuizen	Cora van Nieuwenhuizen (born 1963)	26 October 2017 – 31 August 2021^{[Res]}	People's Party for Freedom and Democracy	Rutte III
Barbara Visser	Barbara Visser (born 1977)	31 August 2021 – 10 January 2022	People's Party for Freedom and Democracy	Rutte III
Mark Harbers	Mark Harbers (born 1969)	10 January 2022 – 2 July 2024	People's Party for Freedom and Democracy	Rutte IV
Barry Madlener	Barry Madlener (born 1969)	2 July 2024 – 3 June 2025^{[Res]}	Party for Freedom	Schoof
Sophie Hermans	Sophie Hermans (born 1981)^{[Deputy]}	3 June 2025 – 19 June 2025^{[Acting]} ^{[Minister]}	People's Party for Freedom and Democracy	Schoof
Robert Tieman	Robert Tieman (born 1976)	19 June 2025 – 23 February 2026	Farmer–Citizen; Movement	Schoof
Vincent Karremans	Vincent; Karremans (born 1986)	23 February 2026 – Incumbent	People's Party for Freedom and Democracy	Jetten

^{Resigned}
^{Resigned following election to the European Parliament}
^{Acting}
^{Ad Interim}
^{Died in office}
^{Deputy Prime Minister}
^{Deputy Prime Minister from 18 October 2002}
^{Medical leave of absence from 1 May 1966 until 30 June 1966}
^{Minister without Portfolio for the Interior}
^{Minister of Housing and Construction}
^{Minister for Kingdom Relations}
^{Minister of Housing and Spatial Planning}
^{Minister of Economic Affairs}
^{Minister of Climate Policy and Green Growth}

== List of state secretaries for infrastructure ==
State Secretary for Transport and Water Management		Portfolio(s)	Term of office	Party	Cabinet
Eddie Stijkel	Eddie Stijkel (1918–1982)	• Public; Transport • Aviation • Rail Transport • Water; Management	15 October 1959 – 24 July 1963	People's Party for Freedom and Democracy	De Quay
Mike Keyzer	Mike Keyzer (1911–1983)	• Public; Transport • Aviation • Rail Transport • Weather; Forecasting	22 October 1963 – 14 April 1965	People's Party for Freedom and Democracy	Marijnen
Siep Posthumus	Siep Posthumus (1910–1987)	• Public; Transport • Rail Transport • Weather; Forecasting	4 May 1965 – 22 November 1966	Labour Party	Cals
Leo de Block	Leo de Block (1904–1988)	• Public; Transport • Rail Transport • Weather; Forecasting	22 November 1966 – 5 April 1967^{[State Secretary]}	Catholic; People's Party	Zijlstra
Mike Keyzer	Mike Keyzer (1911–1983)	• Public; Transport • Aviation • Rail Transport • Water; Management • Weather; Forecasting	18 April 1967 – 6 July 1971	People's Party for Freedom and Democracy	De Jong
Roelof Kruisinga	Roelof Kruisinga (1922–2012)	• Public; Infrastructure • Public; Transport • Rail Transport • Water; Management • Postal Service • Weather; Forecasting	28 July 1971 – 20 March 1973^{[Res]}	Christian; Historical Union	Biesheuvel I • II
Michel van Hulten	Michel van Hulten (1930–2025)	• Public; Infrastructure • Public; Transport • Postal Service	11 May 1973 – 19 December 1977	Political Party of Radicals	Den Uyl
Neelie Kroes	Neelie Kroes (born 1941)	• Public; Infrastructure • Public; Transport • Rail Transport • Water; Management • Postal Service • Weather; Forecasting	28 December 1977 – 11 September 1981	People's Party for Freedom and Democracy	Van Agt I
Jaap van der Doef	Jaap van der Doef (1934–2025)	• Public; Transport • Aviation • Water; Management • Postal Service • Weather; Forecasting	11 September 1981 – 29 May 1982^{[Res]}	Labour Party	Van Agt II
Jaap Scherpenhuizen	Jaap; Scherpenhuizen (1934–2012)	• Public; Infrastructure • Public; Transport • Postal Service • Weather; Forecasting	8 November 1982 – 14 July 1986	People's Party for Freedom and Democracy	Lubbers I
Not in use (1986–1998)
Monique de Vries	Monique de Vries (born 1947)	• Telecommunication • Water; Management • Postal Service • Weather; Forecasting	3 August 1998 – 22 July 2002	People's Party for Freedom and Democracy	Kok II
Melanie Schultz van Haegen	Melanie Schultz van Haegen (born 1970)	• Public; Infrastructure • Public; Transport • Aviation • Rail Transport • Water; Management • Weather; Forecasting	22 July 2002 – 22 February 2007	People's Party for Freedom and Democracy	Balkenende I • II • III
Tineke Huizinga	Tineke Huizinga (born 1960)	• Public; Transport • Water; Management • Weather; Forecasting	22 February 2007 – 23 February 2010^{[App]}	Christian Union	Balkenende IV
State Secretary for Infrastructure and the Environment		Portfolio	Term of office	Party	Cabinet
Joop Atsma	Joop Atsma (born 1956)	• Aviation • Water; Management • Environmental; Policy • Weather; Forecasting	14 October 2010 – 5 November 2012	Christian; Democratic Appeal	Rutte I
Wilma Mansveld	Wilma Mansveld (born 1962)	• Public; Transport • Aviation • Rail Transport • Environmental; Policy • Weather; Forecasting^{[Title]}	5 November 2012 – 28 October 2015^{[Res]}	Labour Party	Rutte II
Sharon Dijksma	Sharon Dijksma (born 1971)	• Public; Transport • Aviation • Rail Transport • Environmental; Policy • Weather; Forecasting^{[Title]}	3 November 2015 – 26 October 2017	Labour Party	Rutte II
State Secretary for Infrastructure and Water Management		Portfolio(s)	Term of office	Party	Cabinet
Stientje van Veldhoven	Stientje van Veldhoven (born 1973)	• Public; Transport • Rail Transport • Water; Management • Environmental; Policy • Weather; Forecasting	26 October 2017 – 1 November 2019	Democrats 66	Rutte III
Stientje van Veldhoven	Stientje van Veldhoven (born 1973)	• Public; Transport • Rail Transport • Water; Management • Environmental; Policy • Weather; Forecasting	14 April 2020 – 10 August 2021^{[Res]}	Democrats 66	Rutte III
Steven van Weyenberg	Steven van Weyenberg (born 1973)	• Public; Transport • Rail Transport • Water; Management • Environmental; Policy • Weather; Forecasting	10 August 2021 – 10 January 2022	Democrats 66	Rutte III
Vivianne Heijnen	Vivianne; Heijnen (born 1982)	• Aviation • Water; Management • Weather; Forecasting	10 January 2022 – 24 May 2024	Christian; Democratic Appeal	Rutte IV
Chris Jansen	Chris Jansen (born 1966)	• Public; Transport • Environmental; Policy	2 July 2024 – 3 June 2025^{[Res]}	Party for Freedom	Schoof
Thierry Aartsen	Thierry Aartsen (born 1989)	• Public; Transport • Environmental; Policy	19 June 2025 – Incumbent	People's Party for Freedom and Democracy	Schoof

^{Resigned}
^{Appointed as Minister of Social Affairs and Health}
^{Designated with the diplomatic rank of Minister}
^{State Secretary for Foreign Affairs}
^{Appointed as Minister of Housing, Spatial Planning and the Environment}

== See also ==
- List of ministers of housing of the Netherlands
