= Bevers =

Bevers is a surname, a variant of Bever or Beevers. Notable people with the surname include:

- Harry Bevers (born 1965), Dutch politician
- Jean Bevers (1852–1909), Dutch politician
