= Cornelis Lely =

Dutch politician (1854–1929)

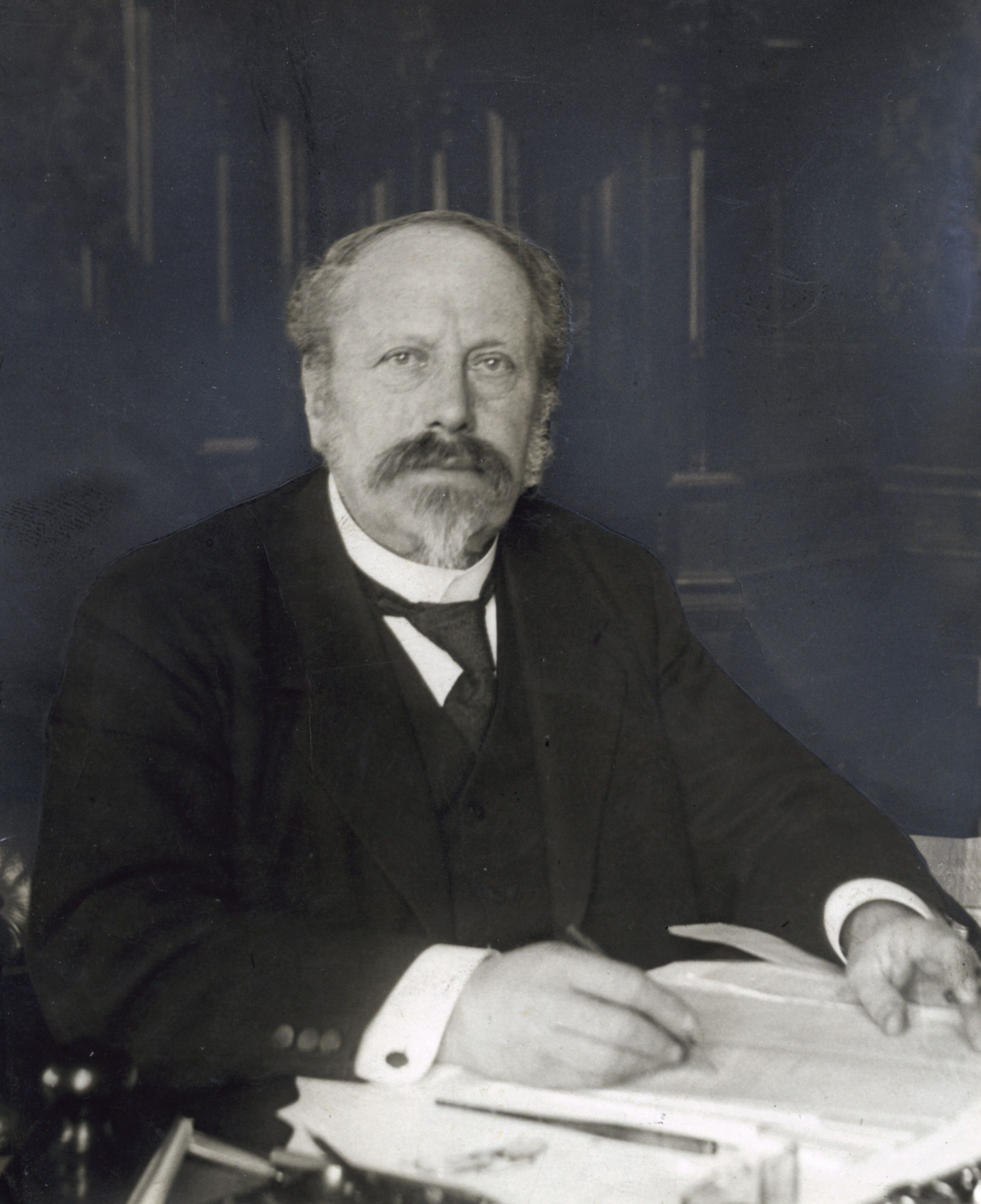
- Lely in 1920

Minister of Water Management
- In office 29 August 1913 – 9 September 1918
- Prime Minister: Pieter Cort van der Linden
- Preceded by: Louis Regout
- Succeeded by: Adrianus König

Member of the Senate
- In office 21 September 1910 – 29 August 1913

Governor–General of Suriname
- In office 4 October 1902 – 12 September 1905
- Monarch: Wilhelmina
- Preceded by: Warmolt Tonckens
- Succeeded by: David Havelaar (ad interim)

Member of the House of Representatives
- In office 17 September 1918 – 24 June 1922
- In office 23 December 1905 – 21 September 1909
- In office 21 September 1897 – 16 August 1902
- In office 16 May 1894 – 27 July 1897
- Constituency: Lochem (1894–1901); Amsterdam IX (1901–1902); Amsterdam II (1905–1909)

Minister of Water Management, Commerce and Industry
- In office 27 July 1897 – 1 August 1901
- Prime Minister: Nicolaas Pierson
- Preceded by: Philippe van der Sleijden
- Succeeded by: Johannes Christiaan de Marez Oyens
- In office 21 August 1891 – 9 May 1894
- Prime Minister: Gijsbert van Tienhoven
- Preceded by: Jacob Havelaar
- Succeeded by: Philippe van der Sleijden

Personal details
- Born: Cornelis Lely; 23 September 1854 Amsterdam, Netherlands
- Died: 22 January 1929 (aged 74) The Hague, Netherlands
- Party: Liberal State Party (from 1921)
- Other political affiliations: Liberal Union (until 1921)
- Spouse: Gerarda van Rinsum (m. 1881; died 1914)
- Children: 3 sons and 1 daughter
- Education: Polytechnic School (Bachelor of Engineering, Master of Engineering)
- Occupation: Politician · Civil servant · Civil engineer · Architect · Researcher · Author

Cornelis Lely (Dutch pronunciation: [kɔrˈneːlɪs ˈleːli]; 23 September 1854 – 22 January 1929) was a Dutch politician of the Liberal Union and civil engineer who was Minister of Water Management and Governor of Suriname. The designer of Afsluitdijk, the largest dam and causeway at its time of construction, in 1932, he oversaw the Zuiderzee Works as Minister, turning the Zuiderzee into a lake and making possible the conversion of a vast area of former seabed into dry land. His plan deeply transposed and influenced the current geography of the Netherlands. Lelystad, the capital of the province of Flevoland, is named after him.

== Early life ==
Cornelis Lely was born on 23 September 1854 in Amsterdam, son of an oilseed trader. Lely went to the Hogere Burgerschool (HBS). He later studied at the Polytechnic School of Delft and graduated as civil engineer in 1875.

== Career outline ==
Between 1886 and 1891, Lely led the technical research team that explored the possibility, later approved by a State Commission, of enclosing the Zuiderzee. The Dutch parliament passed the law creating the Zuiderzee Works on 14 June 1918, using Lely's plan. He served three times as Minister of Transport and Water Management (in 1891–1894, 1897–1901, and 1913–1918) and in this role was hugely influential in advocating the implementation of his own plans. The scheme was finally approved and realised after severe flooding along the shores of the Zuiderzee in 1916.

In 1898 as minister he implemented a law on local railroads and tramways, which played a significant role in the development of the Dutch countryside.

In 1895 Lely became member of the Royal Netherlands Academy of Arts and Sciences. Lely was governor of Suriname from 1902 to 1905. In Suriname, he achieved the initiation and construction of the Lawa Railway from Paramaribo to Benzdorp.

== Remembrance ==
The city of Lelystad, situated in the Eastern Flevoland polder and capital of Flevoland province, was named after him. The flags of the province and of the city are both adorned with a white fleur-de-lys to note his contribution.

In the city of Amsterdam the "Cornelis Lelylaan", a major thoroughfare, is named after him and the Amsterdam Lelylaan station, one of the city's main railway stations, is situated on this road.

In 1905, the Surinamese village of Kofi Djompo was renamed Lelydorp in his honour; Lely having led the construction of a new railway from Paramaribo that ran through the area. Most of the railway has now gone, but Lelydorp survives and is now the capital of Wanica District. It lies on the road from Paramaribo to Johan Adolf Pengel International Airport.

A statue of Lely stands on the western point of the Afsluitdijk. It was sculpted by Mari Andriessen and dedicated on 23 September 1954, the 100th anniversary of Lely's birth. A replica of this statue stands in the center of Lelystad, on a 35-metre-high (115 ft) tower of basalt blocks, designed by Hans van Houwelingen (artist). In Lelystad's city hall is a statue of Lely made by Piet Esser.

== Honours and decorations ==
Honours
Ribbon bar	Honour	Country	Date	Comment
	Commander of the Order of the Netherlands Lion	Netherlands	31 August 1904	

Honorary degrees
University	Field	Country	Date	Comment
Institute of Technology	Hydraulic engineering	Netherlands	8 January 1907	

House of Representatives of the Netherlands
Preceded by Egbert Broer Kielstra	Member for Lochem; 1894–1901	Succeeded by Willem Helsdingen
Preceded by Arnold Kerdijk	Member for Amsterdam IX; 1901–1902	Succeeded by Hendrik Bijleveld
Preceded by Johannes de Visser	Member for Amsterdam II; 1905–1909	Succeeded by Reinhardt Snoeck Henkemans
Political offices
Preceded by Jacob Havelaar	Minister of Water Management, Commerce and Industry; 1891–1894	Succeeded by Philippe van der Sleijden
Preceded by Philippe van der Sleijden	Minister of Water Management, Commerce and Industry; 1897–1901	Succeeded by Johannes Christiaan de Marez Oyens
Preceded by Warmolt Tonckens	Governor–General of Suriname; 1902–1905	Succeeded by David Havelaar; Ad interim
Preceded by Louis Regout	Minister of Water Management; 1913–1918	Succeeded by Adrianus König
