= De Meester cabinet =

Cabinet of the Netherlands, 1905 to 1908

- Cabinet of the Netherlands
- Date formed: 17 August 1905
- Date dissolved: 12 February 1908 (Demissionary from 21 December 1907)

People and organisations
- Head of state: Queen Wilhelmina
- Head of government: Theo de Meester
- No. of ministers: 9
- Ministers removed: 2
- Total no. of members: 11
- Member party: Liberal Union; Free-thinking Democratic League Independent Liberals (Confidence and supply)
- Status in legislature: Left-wing Minority government

History
- Incoming formation: 1905
- Outgoing formation: 1907-1908
- Election: 1905 election
- Outgoing election: 1909 election
- Legislature terms: 1905–1909
- Predecessor: Kuyper cabinet
- Successor: T. Heemskerk cabinet

The De Meester cabinet was the cabinet of the Netherlands from 17 August 1905 until 12 February 1908. The cabinet was formed by the political parties Liberal Union (LU) and the Free-thinking Democratic League (VDB) after the election of 1905. The left-wing cabinet was a minority government in the House of Representatives but was supported by Independent Liberals for a majority. Theo de Meester of the Liberal Union was Prime Minister.

== Composition ==
Composition
Title	Minister			Term of office	
Title	Image	Name	Party	Start	End
Chairman of the Council of Ministers; Minister of Finance	Theo de Meester	Theo de Meester	LU	17 August 1905	12 February 1908
Minister of Interior	Pieter Rink	Pieter Rink	LU	17 August 1905	10 February 1908
Minister of Foreign Affairs	Dirk van Tets van Goudriaan	Dirk van Tets van Goudriaan	Indep. (Note: Liberal)	17 August 1905	12 February 1908
Minister of Justice	Eduard Ellis van Raalte	Eduard Ellis van Raalte	VDB	17 August 1905	12 February 1908
Minister of Water Management, Commerce and Industry (1905–1906); Minister of Water Management (1906–1908)	Jacob Kraus	Jacob Kraus	LU	17 August 1905	12 February 1908
Agriculture, Commerce and Industry	Jacob Veegens	Jacob Veegens	VDB	1 July 1906	12 February 1908
Minister of War	Henri Staal	Henri Staal	LU	17 August 1905	7 April 1907
Minister of War	Willem van Rappard	Willem van Rappard	Indep.	7 April 1907	12 February 1908
Minister of the Navy	William Cohen Stuart	William Cohen Stuart	Indep.	17 August 1905	5 August 1907
Minister of the Navy	Jan Wentholt	Jan Wentholt	Indep.	5 August 1907	12 February 1908
Minister of Colonial Affairs	Dirk Fock	Dirk Fock	LU	17 August 1905	12 February 1908
