= Weede =

Weede is a surname of Dutch origin and may refer to:

== People ==
- Everhard van Weede Dijkvelt (1626–1702), Dutch politician
- Garfield Weede (1880–1971), American sports coach
- Richard G. Weede (1911–1985), American marine
- Robert Weede (1903–1972), American operatic baritone
- Willem Marcus van Weede (1848–1925), Dutch politician

== Places ==
- Weede, Schleswig-Holstein, Germany
