= Robert Regout (politician) =

Dutch politician (1863–1913)

Edmond Robert Hubert Regout
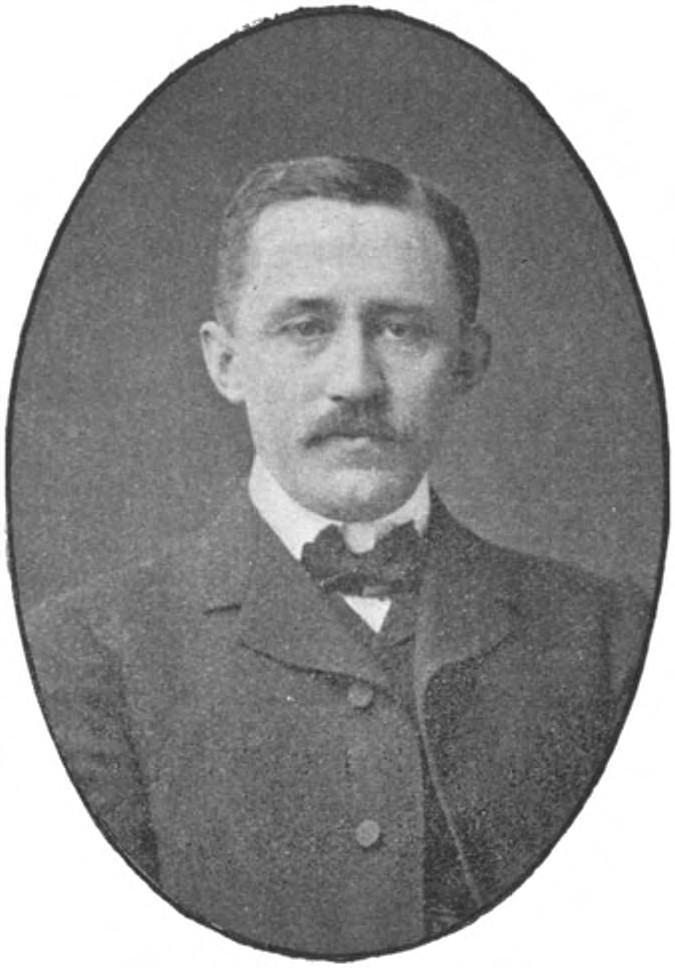

Minister of Justice
- In office 7 June 1910 – 18 January 1913
- Prime Minister: Theo Heemskerk
- Preceded by: Theo Heemskerk (Acting)
- Succeeded by: Theo Heemskerk (Acting)

Member of the House of Representatives
- In office 19 September 1905 – 7 June 1910

Personal details
- Born: 4 June 1863 Maastricht, Netherlands
- Died: 18 January 1913 (Aged 49) The Hague, Netherlands
- Party: General League of Roman Catholic Electoral Associations
- Spouse: Catharina Monica Maria van Sonsbeeck
- Education: University of Amsterdam

Edmond Robert Hubert Regout (4 June 1863 - 18 January 1913) was a Dutch politician who served as Minister of Justice from 1910 until his death in office in 1913.

== Early life ==
Regout was born on 4 June 1863 in Maastricht, Netherlands to Louis Regout (1832–1905) and Theresia Hubertina Berger (1829–1899). He studied law at the University of Amsterdam, graduating in 1886. He married Catharina Monica Maria van Sonsbeeck (1860–1942) on 10 January 1889 in Amsterdam, but the couple remained childless.

== Career & Death ==
Regout practiced as lawyer from 1886 until he was employed with the Public Prosecution Service at the subdistrict court in Roermond on 1 July 1888, before becoming substitute officer of Justice with the Amsterdam court on 1 November 1893. A decade later on 1 December 1903, Regout became an Officer of Justice in Roermond. Regout achieved his first political office when he was elected to the House of Representatives for the Helmond district in 1905. Because of his election, Regout and his wife moved to The Hague. He retained his seat in the House until he was appointed Minister of Justice by Prime Minister Theo Heemskerk following the resignation of the previous Justice Minister Anton Nelissen due to ill health on 7 June 1910. Regout thus served in the same cabinet as his brother Louis Regout, who served as Ministers of Transport and Water Management. Regout served as Minister of Justice until his sudden death in office from a Cardiac arrest on 18 January 1913 in The Hague, aged 49.
