= Leo de Block =

Dutch politician (1904–1988)

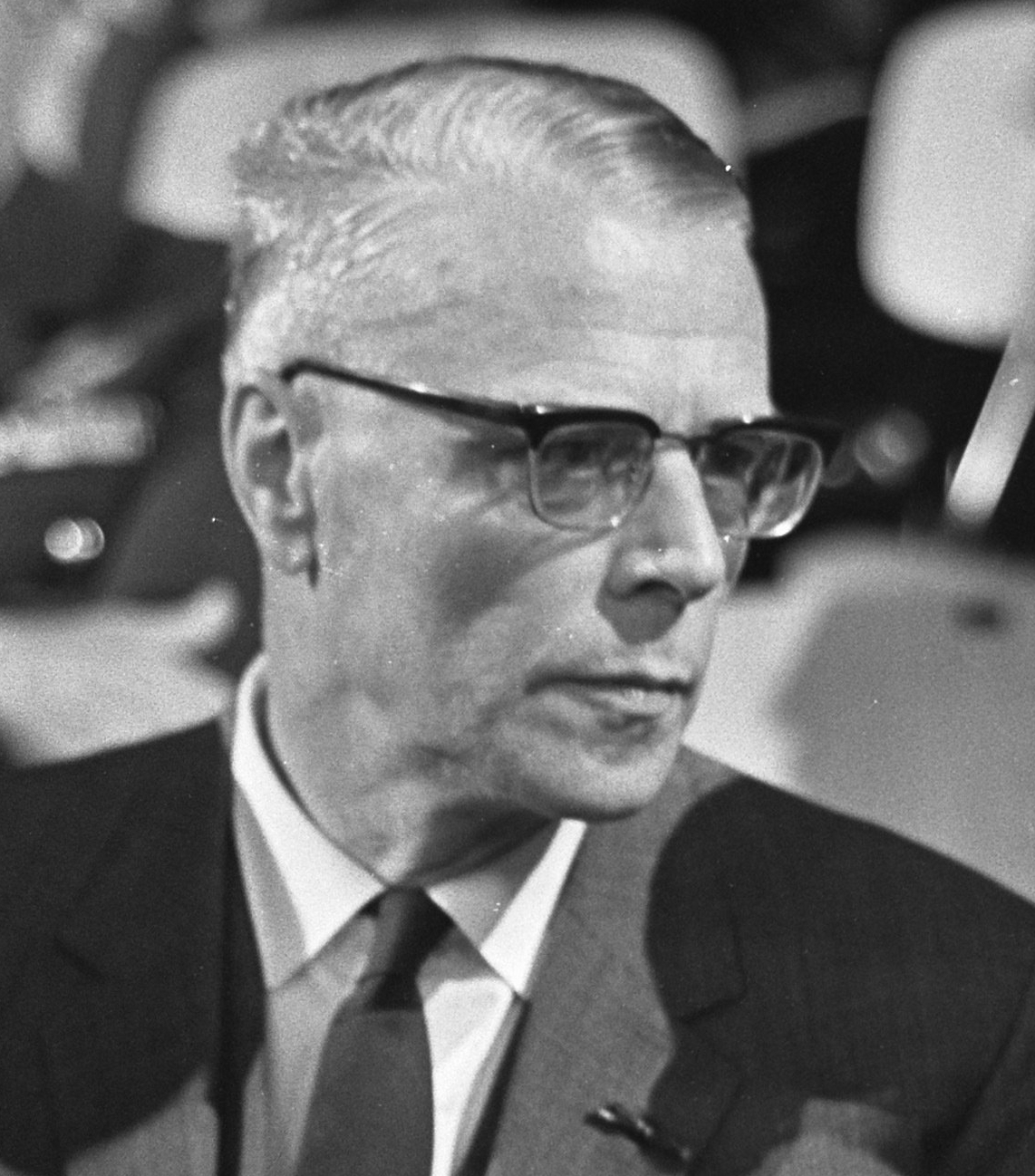
- Leo de Block in 1967

Minister of Economic Affairs
- In office 5 April 1967 – 7 January 1970
- Prime Minister: Piet de Jong
- Preceded by: Joop Bakker
- Succeeded by: Johan Witteveen (Ad interim)

State Secretary for Transport and Water Management
- In office 22 November 1966 – 5 April 1967
- Prime Minister: Jelle Zijlstra
- Preceded by: Siep Posthumus
- Succeeded by: Mike Keyzer

State Secretary for Foreign Affairs
- In office 3 September 1963 – 5 April 1967 Serving with Isaäc Nicolaas; Diepenhorst (1963–1965); Max van der Stoel (1965–1966)
- Prime Minister: See list: Victor Marijnen (1963–1965) Jo Cals (1965–1966) Jelle Zijlstra (1966–1967)
- Preceded by: Hans van Houten
- Succeeded by: Hans de Koster

Personal details
- Born: Leo de Block; 14 August 1904 The Hague, Netherlands
- Died: 4 January 1988 (aged 83) The Hague, Netherlands
- Party: Christian Democratic Appeal (from 1980)
- Other political affiliations: Catholic People's Party (until 1980)
- Spouse: Delphine van Lede (m. 1944)
- Children: 3
- Education: Leiden University (Bachelor of Laws, Master of Laws)
- Occupation: Politician · Civil servant · Jurist · Economist · Businessman · Banker · Financial analyst · Corporate director · Nonprofit director

Leo de Block (14 August 1904 – 4 January 1988) was a Dutch politician of the defunct Catholic People's Party (KVP) now merged into the Christian Democratic Appeal (CDA) party and businessman.

De Block attended the Ignatius Gymnasium in Amsterdam from April 1917 until May 1923 and applied at the Leiden University in June 1923 majoring in Law and obtaining a Bachelor of Laws degree in June 1925 before graduating with a Master of Laws degree in July 1929. De Block worked as a financial analyst for the Amsterdamsche Bank from September 1923 until October 1928 and for the Incasso Bank from October 1928 until August 1945 and for the Het Nederlandse Beheersinstituut from August 1945 until July 1946. De Block worked as Chief executive officer (CEO) of the Incasso Bank from July 1946 until February 1947. De Block worked as a civil servant for the Ministry of Finance from February 1947 until May 1959 as Director-General of the department of Budgetary Affairs from February 1947 until March 1953 and as Deputy Secretary-General of the Ministry of Finance from March 1953 until April 1959 and for the Ministry of Economic Affairs as Director-General of the department for General Economic Policy from April 1959 until May 1960. In May 1960 he was nominated as Chief financial officer (CFO) of KLM.

After the election of 1963 De Block was appointed as State Secretary for Foreign Affairs in the Cabinet Marijnen, taking office on 3 September 1963. The Cabinet Marijnen fell on 27 February 1965 after a disagreement in the coalition about reforms to the public broadcasting system and continued to serve in a demissionary capacity until the cabinet formation of 1965 when it was replaced by the Cabinet Cals with De Block continuing as State Secretary for Foreign Affairs, taking office on 4 May 1965. The Cabinet Cals fell on 14 October 1966 after the Leader of the Catholic People's Party Norbert Schmelzer had proposed a motion that called for a stronger austerity policy to further reduce the deficit was seen an indirect motion of no confidence and continued to serve in a demissionary capacity until the cabinet formation of 1966 when it was replaced by the caretaker Cabinet Zijlstra with De Block remaining State Secretary for Foreign Affairs and also appointed as State Secretary for Transport and Water Management and dual served in those positions, taking office on 22 November 1966. In December De Block announced that he wouldn't stand for the election of 1967. Following the cabinet formation of 1967 De Block was appointed as Minister of Economic Affairs in the Cabinet De Jong, taking office on 5 April 1967. On 7 January 1970 De Block resigned after he disagreed with the cabinets decision to increase the wages in the metal industry but another reason was criticism on his leadership in the handling of the rising inflation after the introduction of the value-added tax (BTW).

De Block semi-retired from in national politics and became active in the private sector and public sector and occupied numerous seats as a corporate director and nonprofit director on several boards of directors and supervisory boards (DSM Company, ING Group, Robeco and Van Lanschot) and served on several state commissions and councils on behalf of the government (Cadastre Agency, Dutch Transport Safety Board and the Advisory Council for Foreign Affairs).

== Decorations ==
Honours
Ribbon bar	Honour	Country	Date	Comment
	Commander of the Order of the Netherlands Lion	Netherlands	6 February 1970	
	Commander of the Order of Orange-Nassau	Netherlands	30 April 1984	

Civic offices
Unknown	Director-General for Industrialization of the Ministry of Economic Affairs; 1959–1960	Unknown
Political offices
Preceded by Hans van Houten	State Secretary for Foreign Affairs; 1963–1967; Served alongside: Isaäc Nicolaas; Diepenhorst (1963–1965); Max van der Stoel (1965–1966)	Succeeded by Hans de Koster
Preceded by Siep Posthumus	State Secretary for Transport and Water Management; 1966–1967	Succeeded by Mike Keyzer
Preceded by Joop Bakker	Minister of Economic Affairs; 1967–1970	Succeeded by Johan Witteveen; Ad interim
Business positions
Unknown	CEO of the Incasso Bank; 1946–1947	Unknown
Unknown	CFO of KLM; 1960–1963	Unknown
