= Piet Esser =

Dutch sculptor (1914–2004)

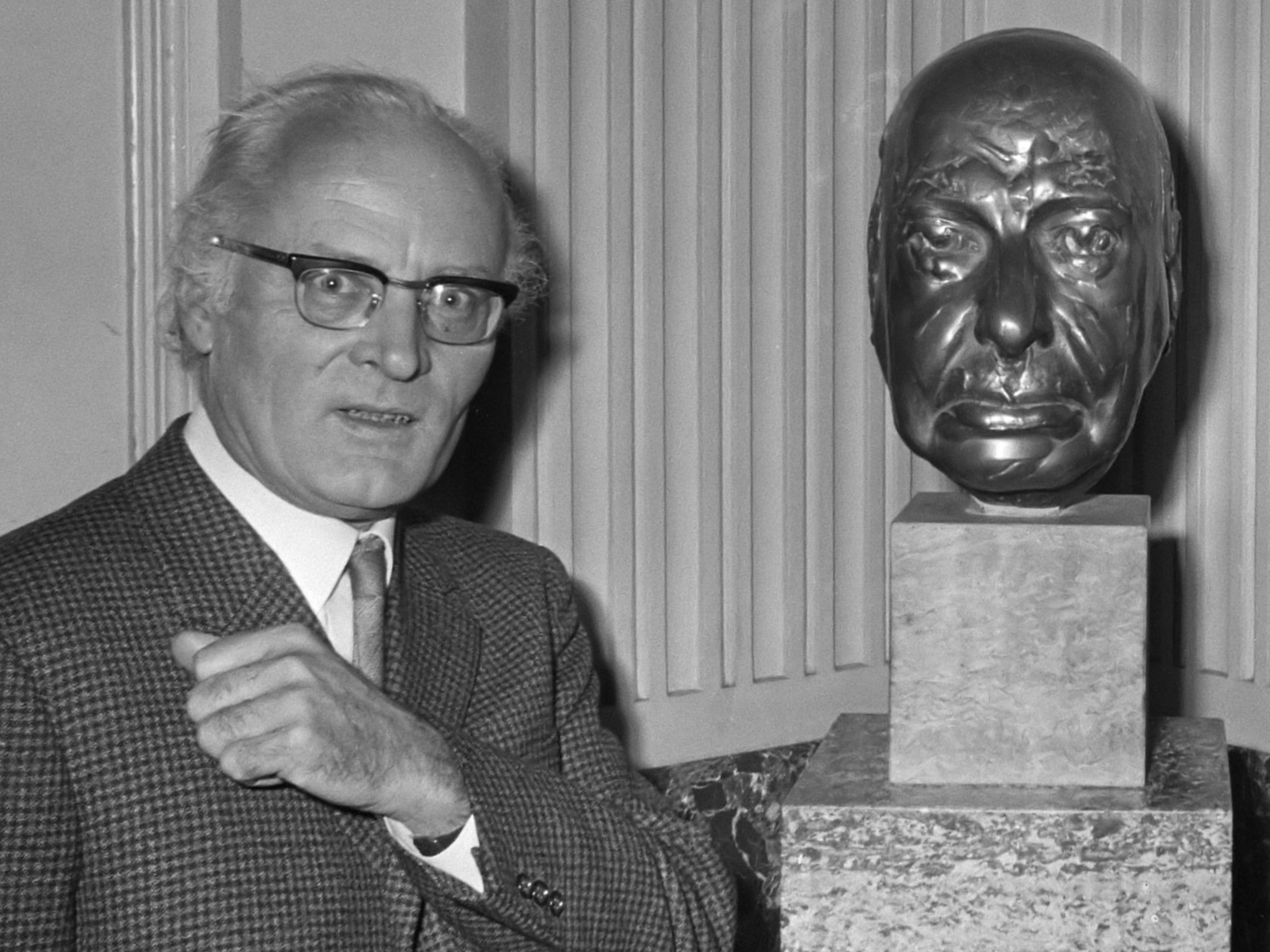
Piet Esser (1970)

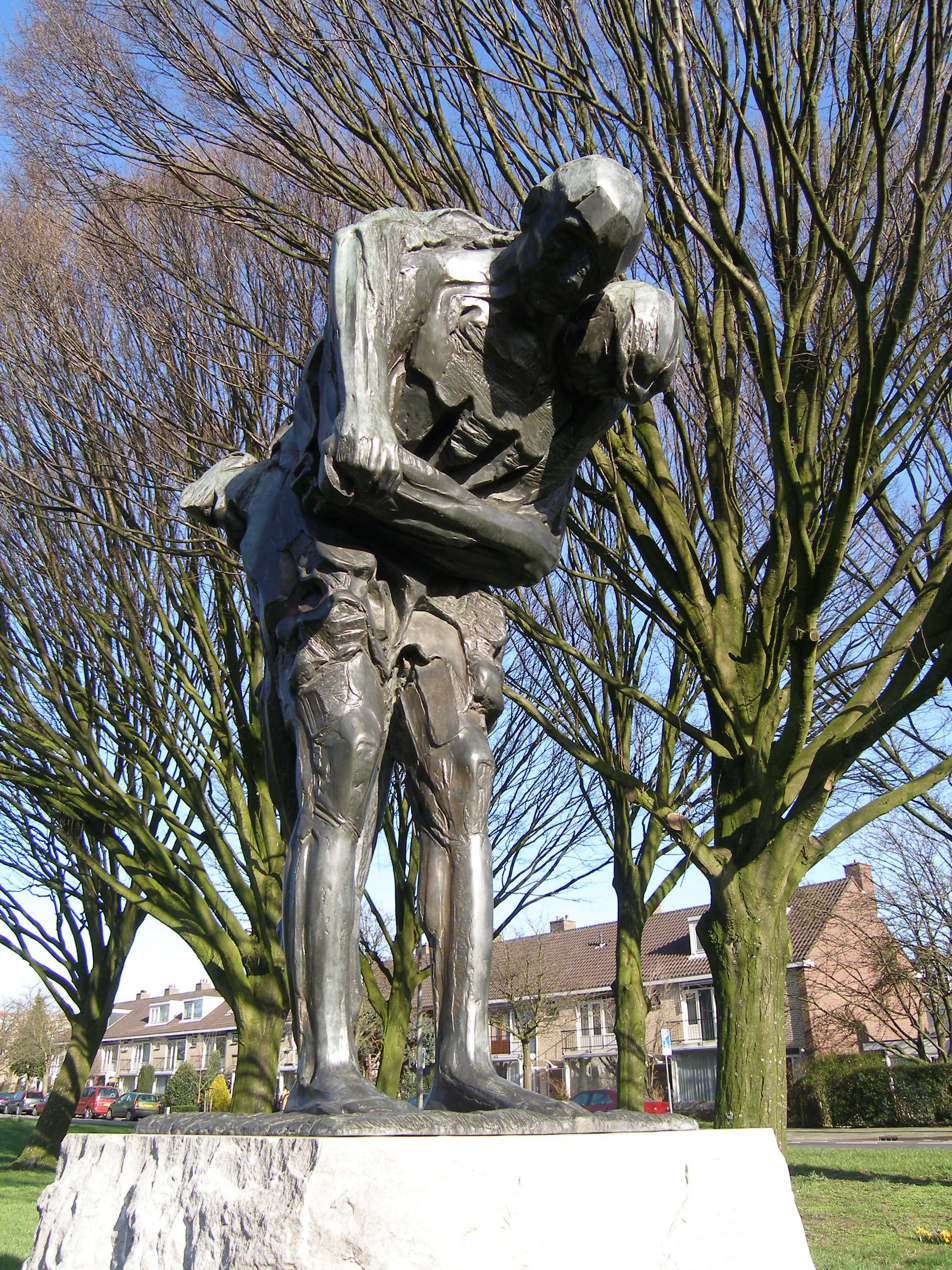
Barmhartige Samaritaan (Good Samaritan) by Piet Esser in Utrecht (1976).

Vincent Pieter Semeyn Esser known as Piet Esser (9 March 1914, Baarn – 19 November 2004) was a Dutch sculptor.

== Biography ==
Esser was part of the Dutch "Groep van de figuratieve abstractie" (Figurative abstraction group). He won a silver medal at the Prix de Rome in 1938, and became a professor at the Rijksakademie, Amsterdam in 1947.

== Selected works ==
- Troelstramonument (monument to Pieter Jelles Troelstra) in The Hague (1953)
- Watersnood 1953 (North Sea flood of 1953) in sculpture garden of Museum Boijmans Van Beuningen, Rotterdam (1957)
- Brederomonument (monument to Gerbrand Adriaensz Bredero) in Amsterdam (1968)
- Icarus in The Hague (1974)
- Barmhartige Samaritaan (Good Samaritan) in Utrecht (1976)
- Statue of Cornelis Lely in Lelystad (1984, erected 2002 but removed at sculptor's request in 2003)

== See also ==
- Piet Esser in Dutch Wikipedia
- Groep van de figuratieve abstractie in Dutch Wikipedia
