= Mike Keyzer =

Dutch politician (1911–1983)

His Excellency Mike Keyzer
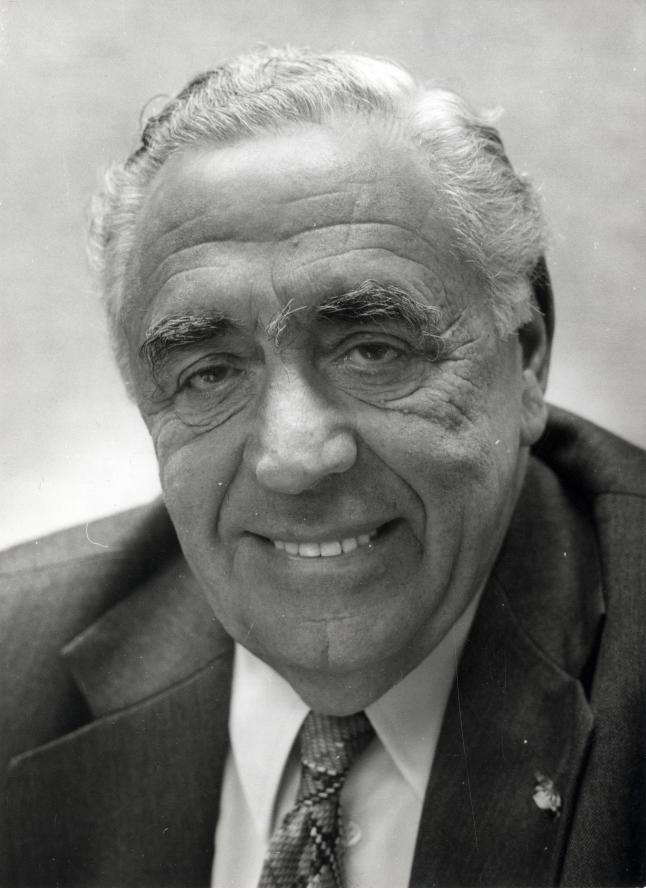
- Mike Keyzer in 1970

State Secretary for Transport and Water Management
- In office 5 April 1967 – 6 July 1971
- Prime Minister: Piet de Jong
- Preceded by: Leo de Block
- Succeeded by: Roelof Kruisinga
- In office 24 July 1963 – 14 April 1965
- Prime Minister: Victor Marijnen
- Preceded by: Eddie Stijkel
- Succeeded by: Siep Posthumus

Member of the House of Representatives
- In office 23 February 1967 – 5 April 1967
- Parliamentary group: People's Party for Freedom and Democracy

Personal details
- Born: Meijer Joseph Keizer; 15 October 1911 Venlo, Netherlands
- Died: 16 July 1983 (aged 71) The Hague, Netherlands
- Party: People's Party for Freedom and Democracy (from 1963)
- Spouse: Hannie Loeb (m. 1937)
- Children: 4 children
- Education: Erasmus University Rotterdam (Bachelor of Economics)
- Occupation: Politician · Diplomat · civil servant · Economist · Corporate director · Nonprofit director · Media administrator

Meijer Joseph "Mike" Keyzer (15 October 1911 – 16 July 1983) was a Dutch politician and diplomat of the People's Party for Freedom and Democracy (VVD).

== Decorations ==
Honours
Ribbon bar	Honour	Country	Date
	Knight of the Order of the Netherlands Lion	Netherlands	20 April 1965
	Officer of the Order of Orange-Nassau	Netherlands	17 July 1971

Political offices
Preceded by Eddie Stijkel	State Secretary for Transport and Water Management; 1963–1965; 1967–1971	Succeeded by Siep Posthumus
Preceded by Leo de Block	State Secretary for Transport and Water Management; 1963–1965; 1967–1971	Succeeded by Roelof Kruisinga
Non-profit organization positions
Unknown	Chairman of the General Association of Radio Broadcasting; 1971–1982	Succeeded by Gerard Wallis de Vries
