= 1905 Dutch cabinet formation =

Formation of the De Meester cabinet

A process of cabinet formation took place following the Dutch general election of 16 June and 28 June 1905, leading to the formation of the De Meester cabinet on 17 August 1905. It was formed by the Liberal Union (LU) and the Free-thinking Democratic League (VDB) with the support of the Free Liberals (VL) and the Social Democratic Workers' Party (SDAP).

== Background ==
=== Election results ===
In the elections, the confessional parties united in the Coalition – General League, Anti-Revolutionary Party and Christian Historical Party – lost their majority. The liberal parties united in the Concentration – LU, VDB and VL – together obtained 45 of the 100 seats. The SDAP won six seats, which could help the liberal parties gain a majority.

== Formateur Borgesius ==
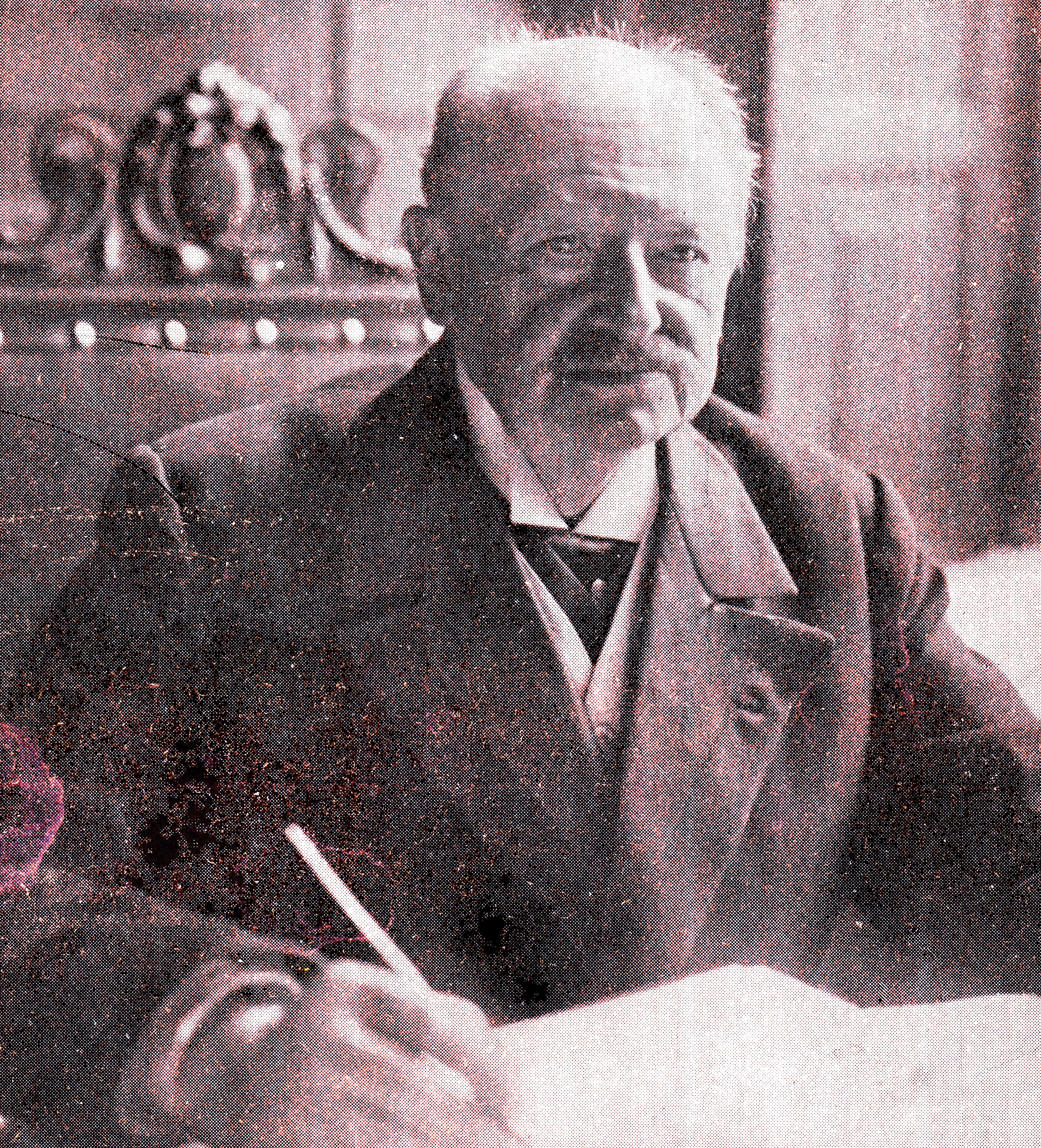
Hendrik Goeman Borgesius in 1913.

Queen Wilhelmina wanted a mixed cabinet, consisting of confessional and non-confessional parties. Wilhelmina estimated that the confessionals would only support a mixed cabinet if a liberal minority cabinet was not possible. She therefore consciously sought advice from the conservative-liberal "stiffhead" Abraham van Karnebeek, who would reject cooperation with progressive liberals. Indeed, he advised that the liberals were too divided to form a cabinet. An attempt by Nicolaas Pierson (LU) to also have Meinard Tydeman (VL) give advice was rejected by Wilhelmina. The confessionals saw insufficient reason in Van Karnebeek's response to break through the antithesis and form a mixed cabinet. They only considered that an option after a failed formation or fall of a liberal minority cabinet.

Wilhemina therefore focused on a liberal minority cabinet under the assumption that it would fall prematurely and could subsequently lead to a mixed cabinet. Wilhelmina then appointed the leader of the LU, Hendrik Goeman Borgesius, as formateur. Borgesius himself preferred an extra-parliamentary cabinet over a liberal minority cabinet, because he feared that the latter would be too fragile. Borgesius did hint this to Wilhelmina, but he could not openly avoid responsibility.

It took Borgesius a lot of effort to bring the liberal parties together. Van Karnebeek was particularly bothersome. But the Free Liberals were also not enthusiastic and supported mainly to prevent Abraham Kuyper from ruling again.

Borgesius chose to leave the office of prime minister to someone else, because otherwise the Liberals risked losing his seat in Enkhuizen. He asked Pieter Cort van der Linden, who only wanted to do it in an extra-parliamentary mixed cabinet. Wilhelmus Frederik van Leeuwen, Willem Hendrik de Beaufort, Bernardus Reiger also rejected. Member of Parliament Gerard Anton van Hamel eventually withdrew for health reasons. Ultimately, Borgesius found the prospective Minister of Finance Theo de Meester willing to accept the office of prime minister. The cabinet was sworn in on 17 August 1905.
