= Bastiaan Ort =

Dutch lawyer, judge and politician (1854–1927)

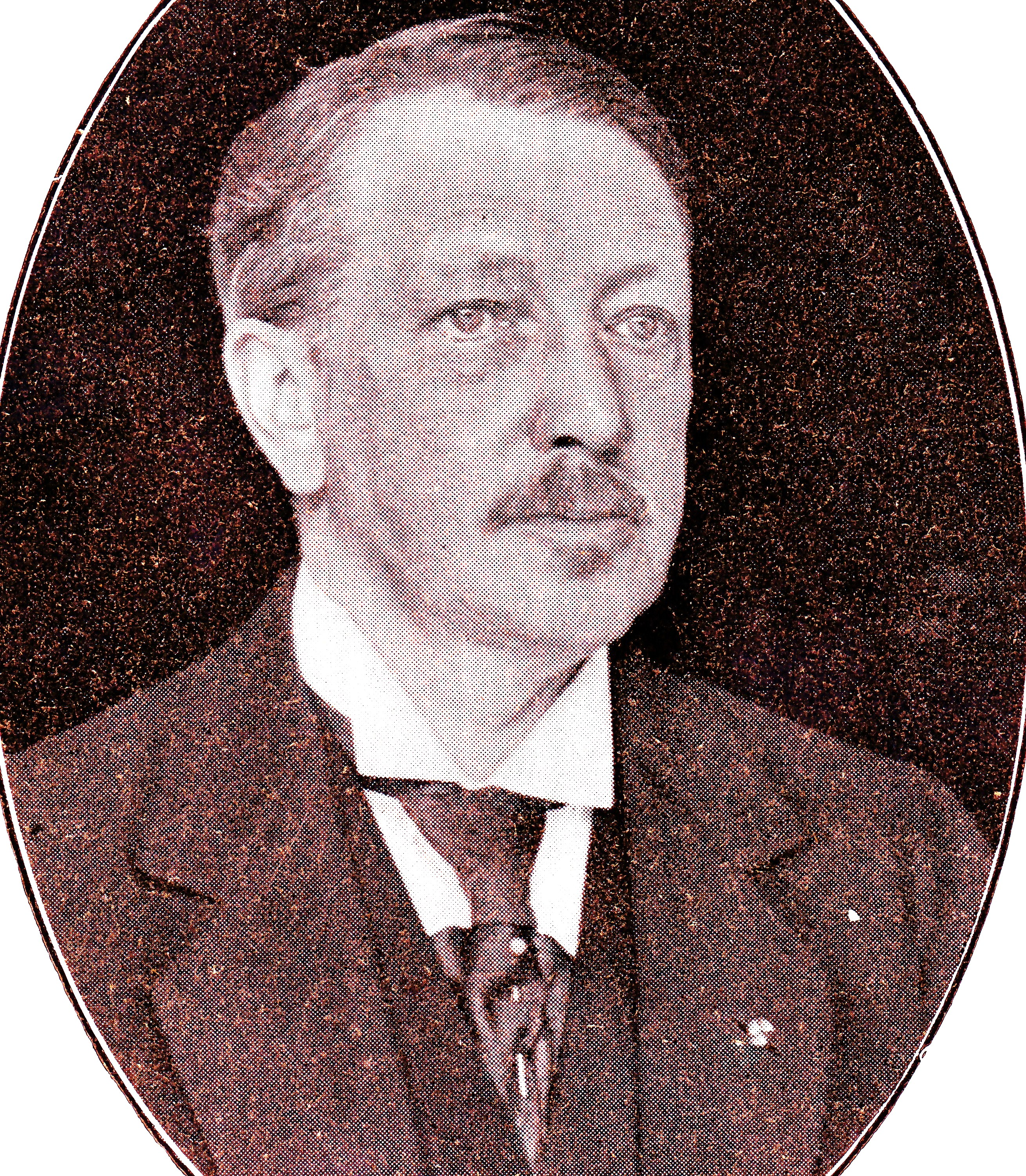
Bastiaan Ort in 1913

Bastiaan Ort (born 6 January 1854 in Gorinchem – died 4 November 1927 in The Hague) was a Dutch lawyer, judge and politician. As an independent liberal he was Minister of Justice in the Cort van der Linden cabinet from 1913 to 1918.
