= Luchtverkeersleiding Nederland =

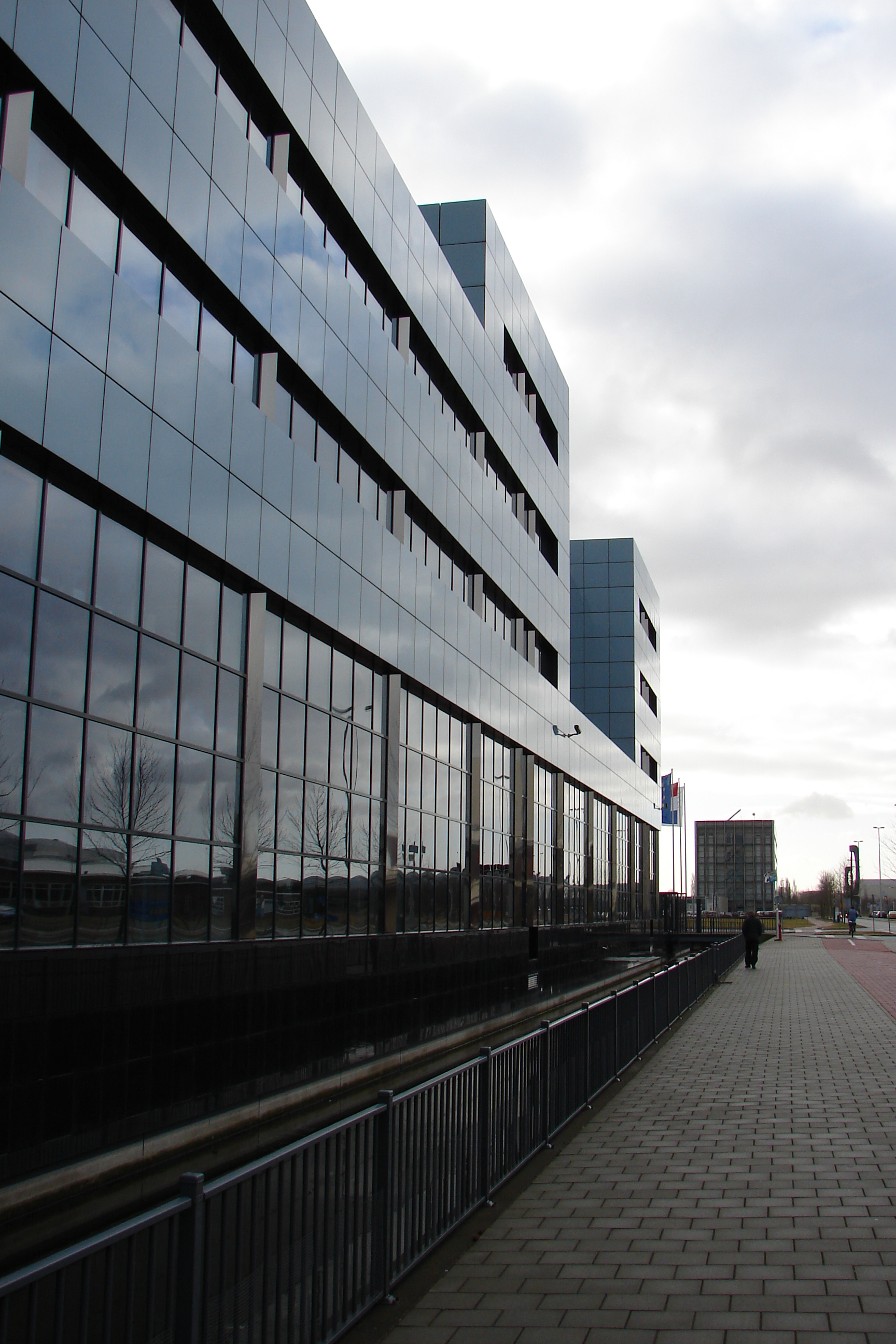
- Logo
- Industry: Air traffic control
- Founded: 1997
- Headquarters: Schiphol, Netherlands
- Number of locations: 4 Control Centers (2011)
- Area served: Nationwide
- Revenue: € 179.4 Million (2012); (in Dutch)
- Owner: Kingdom of the Netherlands
- Number of employees: 862
- Website: Website van de Luchtverkeersleiding Nederland

Luchtverkeersleiding Nederland (LVNL) is the agency in charge of air traffic control in the airspace of the Netherlands. Since 1998 it is an independent government agency. The LVNL is integrated into the Central European Functional Airspace Block (FABEC).

== History ==
The origin of the LVNL can be traced back to 1923 when the Royal Aviation Service (Rijksluchtvaartdienst) was created and the Directorate for Aviation Security was created.

== Organisation ==
The agency is based at Schiphol airport and has offices at 3 other airports:

- Rotterdam Airport
- Groningen Airport Eelde
- Maastricht Aachen Airport

In addition to handling civil aviation traffic in the Netherlands, the LVNL is also responsible for the maintenance of all technical installations required to accomplish this, the provision of aviation information, controller training and provision of aviation maps.
