= Koninklijke TNT Post =

Defunct Dutch postal company

Koninklijke TNT Post BV
- Logo used until 2011
- Type: Limited liability company
- Industry: Postal service
- Founded: 1752 (original)
- Defunct: May 2011
- Fate: Rebranded to PostNL
- Successor: PostNL
- Headquarters: The Hague, Netherlands
- Owner: TNT N.V.
- Website: tntpost.nl

Koninklijke TNT Post BV (Dutch pronunciation: [ˈkoːnɪŋkləkə ˌteːɛnˌteː ˈpɔst beːˌveː]) was the national postal company in the Netherlands, owned by TNT N.V. Until May 2011, it operated under the brand TNT Post and employed 75,000 people.

== History ==
In 1989, the state-run enterprise PTT became Royal PTT Netherlands (Koninklijke PTT Nederland: KPN), and the company was incorporated. In 1993, mail offices were privatised, and KPN was listed on the stock exchange in 1994. In 1996, the Australian company TNT Ltd. was obtained through acquisition, and KPN's postal service and TNT merged to form TNT Postal Group (TPG), later renamed TNT N.V.

The national postal service of the Netherlands was called PTT Post until 2002, then TPG Post until October 16, 2006, then finally renamed TNT Post. The old red TPG mailboxes were changed to the new orange TNT mailboxes throughout the country.

In May 2011, due to growing divergence of two major TNT N.V. divisions, mail and express, TNT N.V. changed its name to PostNL after demerging TNT Express. TNT Post was then also rebranded PostNL.

In 2016, FedEx Express, with the approval of the EU, acquired the split-off TNT Express for an amount of $4.8 billion.

== Gallery ==
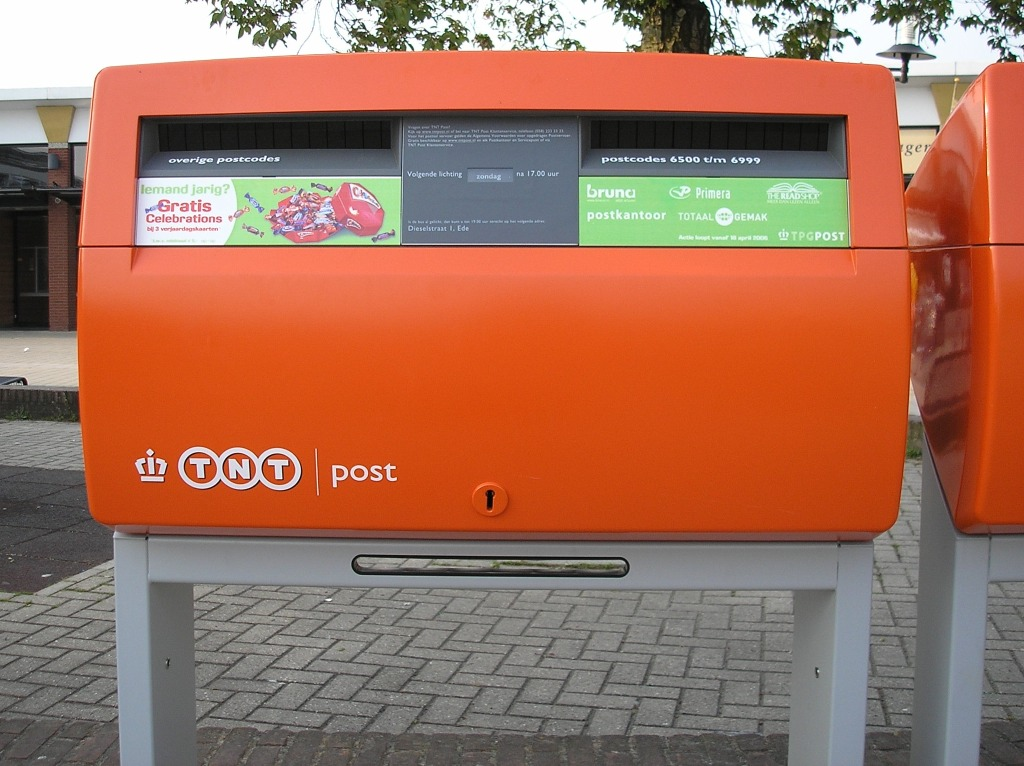
TNT Post postbox

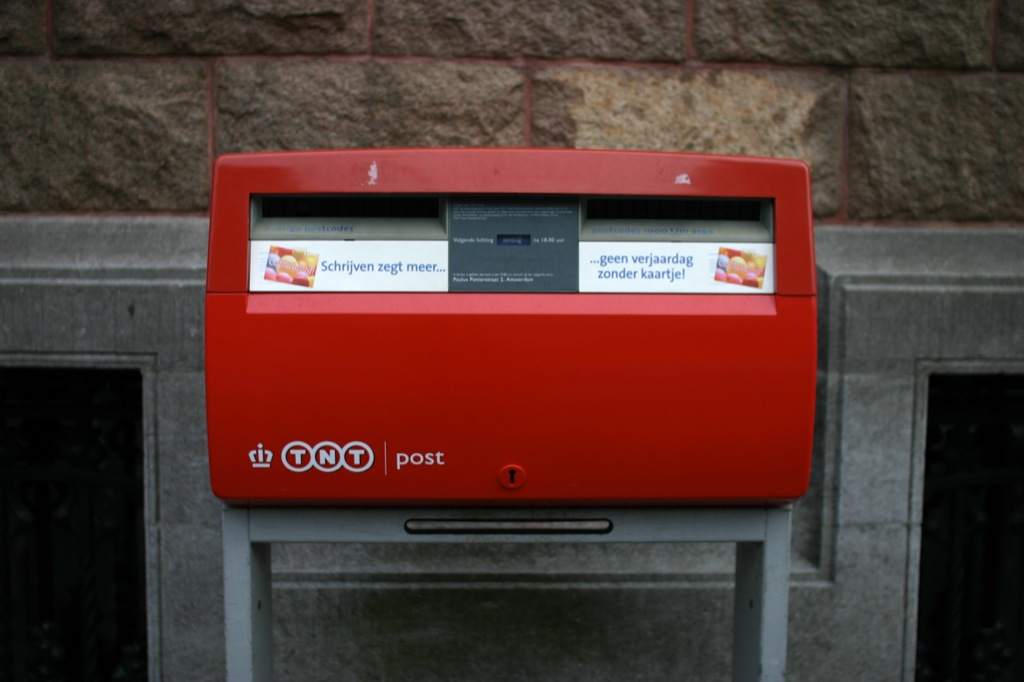
New postbox, red only in Amsterdam

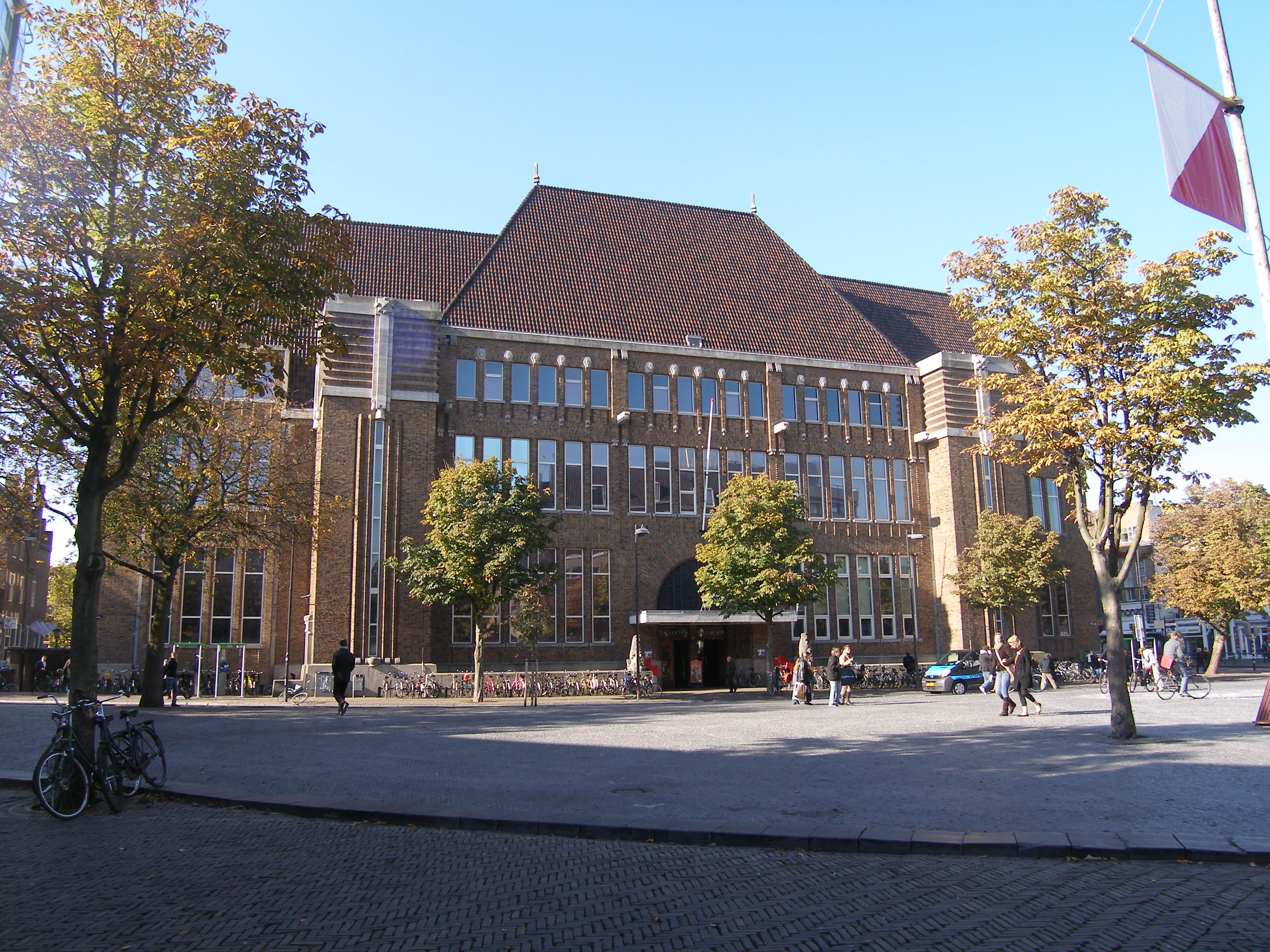
Main post office in Utrecht

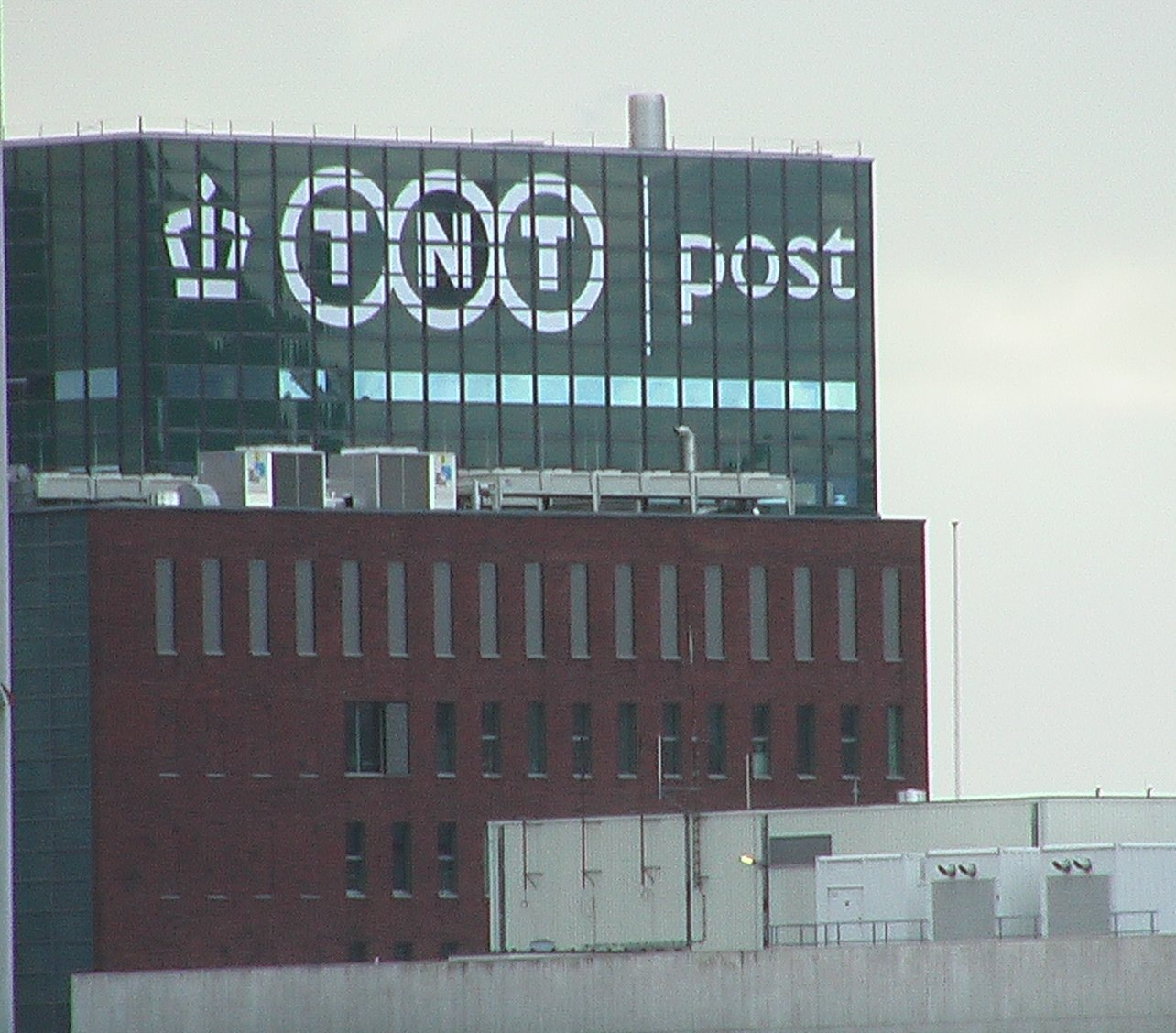
Headquarters in the Hague

== Slogan ==
"Sure we can" has been TNT Post's slogan since 2010.

== See also ==
- List of postal codes in the Netherlands
- Postage stamps and postal history of the Netherlands
- PostNL
- TNT N.V.
