= Theo Heemskerk =

Dutch politician (1852–1932)

His Excellency Theo Heemskerk
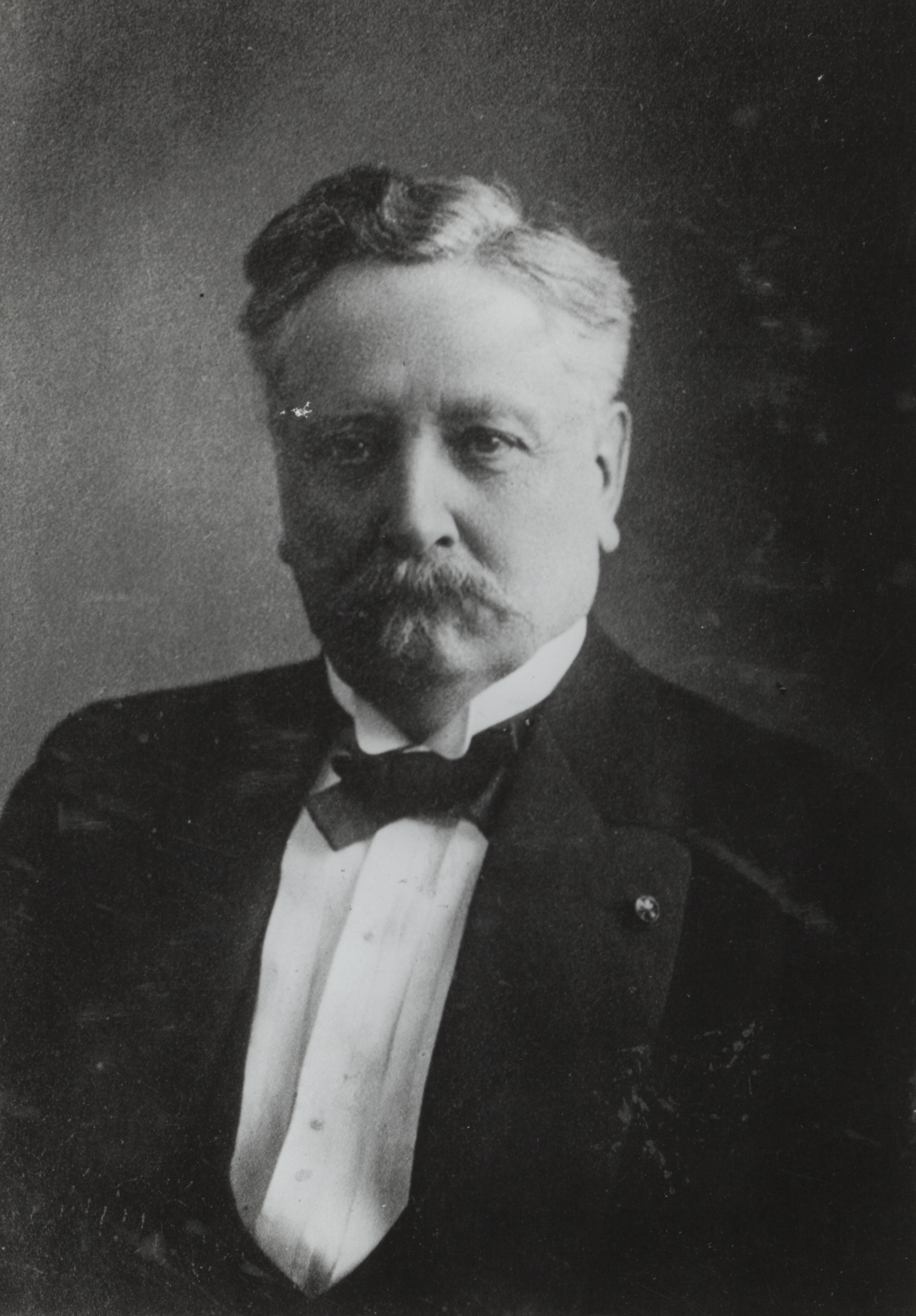
- Heemskerk in 1927

Chairman of the Council of Ministers
- In office 12 February 1908 – 29 August 1913
- Monarch: Wilhelmina
- Preceded by: Theo de Meester
- Succeeded by: Pieter Cort van der Linden

Member of the Council of State
- In office 1 October 1913 – 9 September 1918
- Vice President: Joan Röell (1913–1914); Wilhelmus van Leeuwen (1914–1918)

Minister of Justice
- In office 9 September 1918 – 4 September 1925
- Prime Minister: Charles Ruijs de Beerenbrouck
- Preceded by: Bastiaan Ort
- Succeeded by: Jan Schokking
- In office 18 January 1913 – 29 August 1913
- Prime Minister: Theo Heemskerk
- Preceded by: Robert Regout
- Succeeded by: Bastiaan Ort
- In office 11 May 1910 – 7 June 1910; Ad interim
- Prime Minister: Theo Heemskerk
- Preceded by: Anton Nelissen
- Succeeded by: Robert Regout

Minister of the Interior
- In office 12 February 1908 – 29 August 1913
- Prime Minister: Theo Heemskerk
- Preceded by: Pieter Rink
- Succeeded by: Pieter Cort van der Linden

Minister of Colonial Affairs
- In office 12 February 1908 – 20 May 1908; Ad interim
- Prime Minister: Theo Heemskerk
- Preceded by: Dirk Fock
- Succeeded by: Alexander Idenburg

Parliamentary leader in the House of Representatives
- In office 16 September 1925 – 17 September 1929
- Preceded by: Victor Rutgers
- Succeeded by: Hendrikus Colijn
- In office 22 September 1903 – 12 February 1908
- Preceded by: Jan van Alphen
- Succeeded by: Abraham Kuyper
- Parliamentary group: Anti-Revolutionary Party

Member of the House of Representatives
- In office 15 September 1925 – 12 June 1932
- In office 25 July 1922 – 18 September 1922
- In office 7 September 1901 – 12 February 1908
- In office 19 June 1894 – 21 September 1897
- In office 25 April 1893 – 20 March 1894
- In office 1 May 1888 – 15 September 1891

Personal details
- Born: Theodorus Heemskerk; 20 July 1852 Amsterdam, Netherlands
- Died: 12 June 1932 (aged 79) Utrecht, Netherlands
- Party: Anti-Revolutionary Party
- Spouses: Maria Hartsen (m. 1881; died 1886) Lydia von Zaremba (m. 1891)
- Children: 2 daughters and 1 son (first marriage); 2 sons and 2 daughters (second marriage)
- Parent: Jan Heemskerk (father)
- Education: Polytechnic School (Bachelor of Engineering); Leiden University (Bachelor of Laws, Master of Laws)
- Occupation: Politician; civil servant; jurist; lawyer

Theodorus Heemskerk (20 July 1852 – 12 June 1932) was a Dutch politician of the Anti-Revolutionary Party (ARP) who served as Chairman of the Council of Ministers from 12 February 1908 until 29 August 1913.

Heemskerk's premiership witnessed the passage of various reforms in areas like education, working conditions, and social security.

His father Jan Heemskerk also served as Chairman of the Council of Ministers.

== Decorations ==
Honours
Ribbon bar	Honour	Country	Date	Comment
	Knight Grand Cross of the Order of Orange-Nassau	Netherlands	10 October 1913	
	Commander of the Order of the Netherlands Lion	Netherlands	27 August 1926	
Ribbon bar	Honour	Country	Date	Comment
	Minister of State	Netherlands	27 August 1926	Style of Excellency

House of Representatives of the Netherlands
New district	Member for Ridderkerk; 1888–1891	Succeeded by Arie Smit
Preceded by Walle Melis Oppedijk	Member for Harlingen; 1893–1894	Succeeded by Abraham Bouman
Preceded by Willem Brantsen van de Zijp	Member for Sneek; 1894–1897	Succeeded by Jan van Gilse
Preceded by Bernardus Heldt	Member for Amsterdam VII; 1901–1905	Succeeded by Cornelis Blooker
Preceded by Alexander van Löben Sels	Member for Sliedrecht; 1905–1908	Succeeded by Jan van der Molen
Political offices
Preceded by Pieter Rink	Minister of the Interior; 1908–1913	Succeeded by Pieter Cort van der Linden
Preceded by Theo de Meester	Chairman of the Council of Ministers; 1913–1918	Succeeded by Pieter Cort van der Linden
Preceded by Dirk Fock	Minister of Colonial Affairs; Ad interim 1908	Succeeded by Alexander Idenburg
Preceded by Anton Nelissen	Minister of Justice; 1910; Ad interim 1913; 1918–1925	Succeeded by Robert Regout
Preceded by Robert Regout	Minister of Justice; 1910; Ad interim 1913; 1918–1925	Succeeded by Bastiaan Ort
Preceded by Bastiaan Ort	Minister of Justice; 1910; Ad interim 1913; 1918–1925	Succeeded by Jan Schokking
