= Jan Hendrik de Waal Malefijt =

Dutch politician (1852–1931)

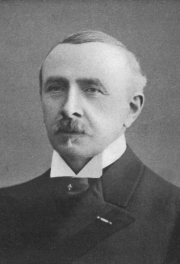
Cornelis Johannes Lodewicus Vermeulen, 1917

Jan Hendrik de Waal Malefijt (31 January 1852 in Overveen, North Holland – 14 March 1931 in Katwijk) was a Dutch politician.

== Political functions ==
- City council of Zeist: 1884-1890
- Mayor of Westbroek: 1890-1903
- Mayor of Achttienhoven: 1890-1903
- States-Provincial of Utrecht: 1892-1909
- House of Representatives: 1897-1909
- Gedeputeerde staten of Utrecht: 1903-1909
- Minister of Colonial Affairs: 1909-1913
- Mayor of Katwijk: 1914-1927
- States-Provincial of South-Holland: 1916-1917
- Senate: 1917-1925

House of Representatives of the Netherlands
Preceded by Willem Roijaards van den Ham	Member for Breukelen; 1897–1909	Succeeded by Frederik de Monté verLoren
Political offices
Preceded by Alexander Idenburg	Minister of Colonial Affairs; 1909–1913	Succeeded by Thomas Bastiaan Pleyte
