= Willem Marcus van Weede van Berencamp =

Dutch diplomat and foreign minister

Willem Marcus van Weede van dan Berencamp (1848–1925) was a Dutch diplomat and foreign minister. He studied law at the Royal University of Utrecht. In 1901 he was appointed of envoy to Vienna. In 1905 he became foreign minister but shortly after returned to Vienna. He had been on friendly terms with Franz Jozef, the fall of Austria-Hungary was a big blow to him. He spent much of his later life doing charity work in Vienna.
