= Jean Bevers =

Dutch politician (1852–1909)

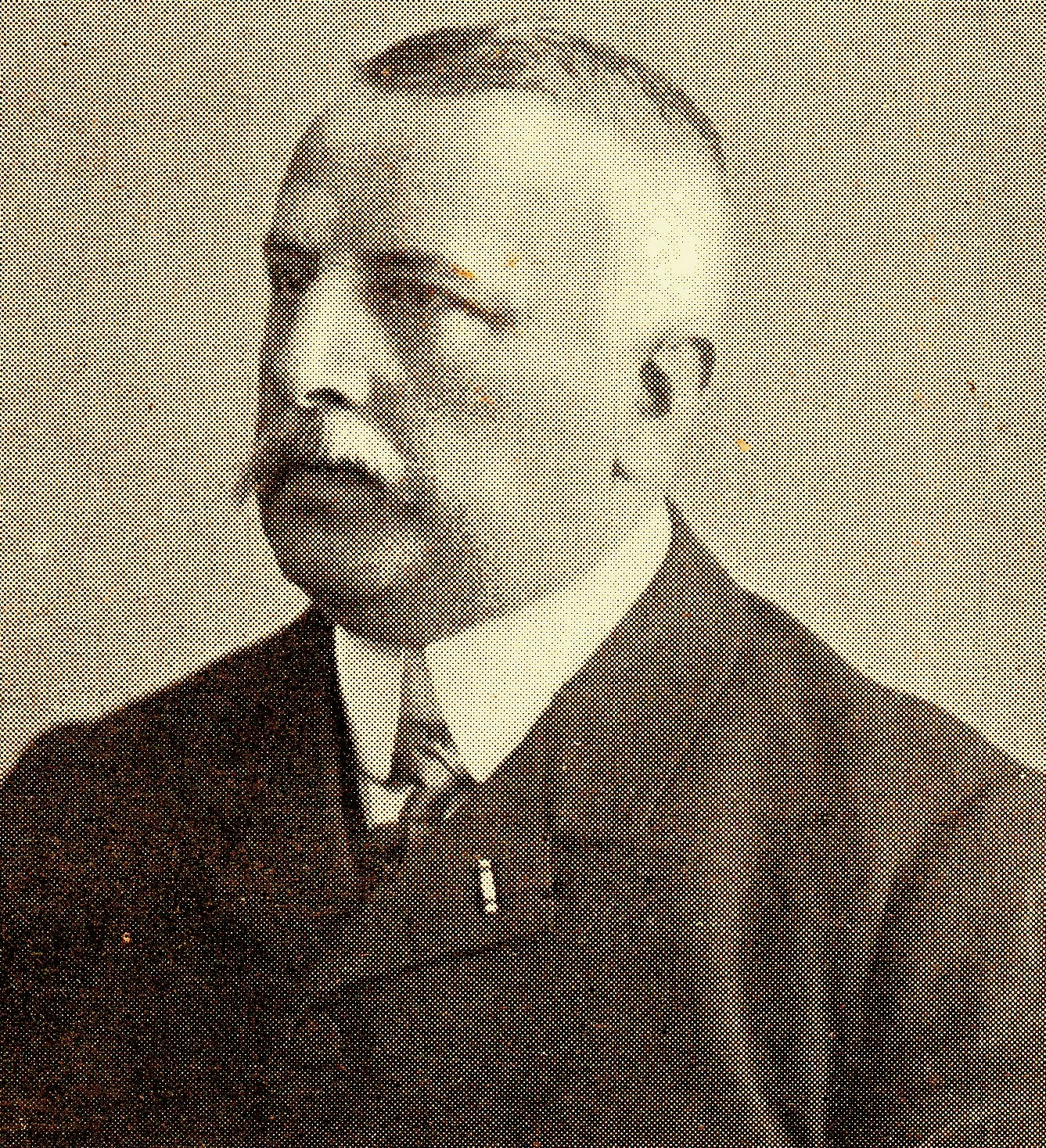
Bevers in 1908

Jean Gustave Stanislas Bevers (23 September 1852 – 5 January 1909) was a Dutch politician. He was a member of the House of Representatives from 1888 to 1894 and of the Senate between 1902 and 1908, and briefly served as Minister of Water Management between 1908 and 1909.

House of Representatives of the Netherlands
New district	Member for Doetinchem; 1888–1894	Succeeded by Herman Hesselink van Suchtelen
Political offices
Preceded by Jacob Kraus	Minister of Water Management; 1908–1909	Succeeded by Syb Talma
