= Jacob Kraus =

Dutch engineer, politician (1861–1951)

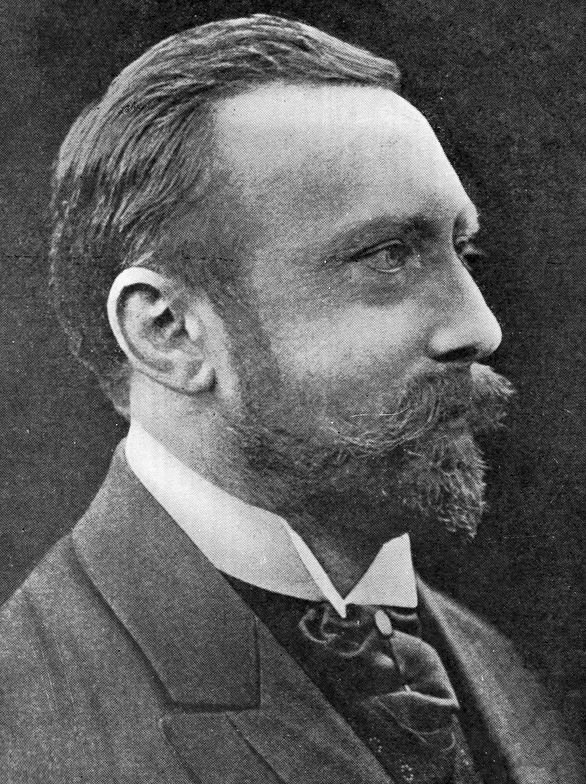
Jacob Kraus (1914)

Jacob Kraus (14 October 1861, Groningen – 24 August 1951, The Hague) was a Dutch hydraulic engineer, professor at the University of Santiago, Chile, and at Delft University of Technology and government minister of water management between 1905 and 1908.

== See also ==
- List of rectores magnifici of Delft University of Technology
