= Louis Regout =

Dutch politician

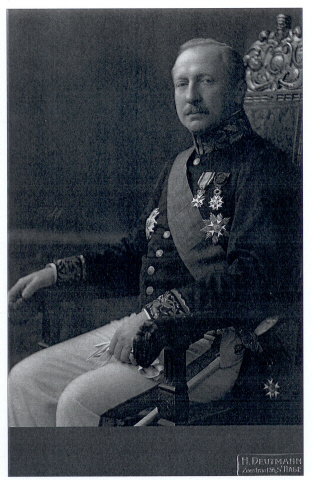
Louis Regout in 1913

Louis Hubert Willem Regout (27 October 1861, Maastricht – 27 October 1915, Rome) was a Dutch politician.
