= Apeldoorn (electoral district) =

The district of Apeldoorn in 1888

Apeldoorn was an electoral district of the House of Representatives in the Netherlands from 1888 to 1918.

== Profile ==
The electoral district of Apeldoorn was created as a single-seat district in 1888, mostly out of part of the Amersfoort district, and a small part of the Deventer district, both of which were reduced from two seats to one. Situated in the Veluwe region in the northwest of the province of Gelderland, it encompassed the municipalities of Apeldoorn, Epe, Ermelo, Harderwijk and Putten. The district was primarily rural and agrarian.

Apeldoorn's population increased from 45,378 in 1888 to 68,208 in 1909. Members of the Dutch Reformed Church predominated in the district, making up 78% of its population in 1888, though this share dropped to 72.8% in 1909. The Roman Catholic minority in the district decreased from 9.5% to 8.3% in the same period, while the share of the population identifying as Gereformeerd rose from 10.1% to 11.9%. The population in the category "Other" encompassed 2.5% of the population in 1888, and 7% in 1909.

The district of Apeldoorn was abolished upon the introduction of party-list proportional representation in 1918.

== Members ==
Van Bylandt in 1913

Apeldoorn was a safe seat for the confessional right. Its inaugural election 1888 was won by Frederik van Bylandt, the Anti-Revolutionary candidate. Van Bylandt continued to represent the district for the next 28 years, leaving the Anti-Revolutionary Party in 1894 to eventually become a member of the Christian Historical Union, and serving as Speaker of the House of Representatives between 1909 and 1912. He generally won reelection easily, except in 1913, when he narrowly defeated the Freethinking Democratic candidate J. Esmeijer in the second round.

Van Bylandt resigned for health reasons in 1916, and the subsequent by-election was won by the Christian Historical candidate Reinhardt Snoeck Henkemans, who continued to represent the district until its abolition in 1918.

Election	Member	Party	Ref.
1888	Frederik van Bylandt	AR	
1891	Frederik van Bylandt	AR	
1894	Frederik van Bylandt	AR	
1897	Frederik van Bylandt	VA	
1901	Frederik van Bylandt	VA	
1905	Frederik van Bylandt	CHP	
1909	Frederik van Bylandt	CHU	
1913	Frederik van Bylandt	CHU	
1916	Reinhardt Snoeck Henkemans	CHU	
1917	Reinhardt Snoeck Henkemans	CHU	

== Election results ==
=== Elections in the 1880s ===
1888 general election: Apeldoorn
Candidate	Party	Votes	%
Frederik van Bylandt	AR	1,525	61.67
J.D. van de Velde	Lib	799	32.31
Otto Jan Herbert van Limburg Stirum	NK	127	5.14
Others		22	0.89
Total		2,473	100.00
Valid votes		2,473	99.64
Invalid/blank votes		9	0.36
Total votes		2,482	100.00
Registered voters/turnout		2,920	85.00
Anti-Revolutionary gain			
Source: Electoral Council, Huygens Institute

=== Elections in the 1890s ===
1891 general election: Apeldoorn
Candidate	Party	Votes	%
Frederik van Bylandt	AR	1,270	55.15
Hubert Philippus de Kanter	Lib	1,022	44.38
Others		11	0.48
Total		2,303	100.00
Valid votes		2,303	99.18
Invalid/blank votes		19	0.82
Total votes		2,322	100.00
Registered voters/turnout		3,007	77.22
Anti-Revolutionary hold			
Source: Electoral Council, Huygens Institute

1894 general election: Apeldoorn
Candidate	Party	First round		Second round	
Candidate	Party	Votes	%	Votes	%
Frederik van Bylandt	AR	900	46.44	1,356	58.27
G.W. Mollerus	Lib	676	34.88	971	41.73
M.J. Chevallier	AR	352	18.16		
Others		10	0.52		
Total		1,938	100.00	2,327	100.00
Valid votes		1,938	99.44	2,327	99.66
Invalid/blank votes		11	0.56	8	0.34
Total votes		1,949	100.00	2,335	100.00
Registered voters/turnout		2,958	65.89	2,958	78.94
Anti-Revolutionary hold					
Source: Electoral Council, Huygens Institute

1897 general election: Apeldoorn
Candidate	Party	Votes	%
Frederik van Bylandt	VA	2,455	50.52
H.C. van der Houven van Oordt	Lib	2,164	44.54
J.G. van Kuykhof	SDAP	240	4.94
Total		4,859	100.00
Valid votes		4,859	98.24
Invalid/blank votes		87	1.76
Total votes		4,946	100.00
Registered voters/turnout		6,693	73.90
Free Antirevolutionary gain			
Source: Electoral Council, Huygens Institute

=== Elections in the 1900s ===
1901 general election: Apeldoorn
Candidate	Party	Votes	%
Frederik van Bylandt	VA	3,013	59.26
Hubert Philippus de Kanter	Lib	2,071	40.74
Total		5,084	100.00
Valid votes		5,084	99.05
Invalid/blank votes		49	0.95
Total votes		5,133	100.00
Registered voters/turnout		7,192	71.37
Free Antirevolutionary hold			
Source: Electoral Council, Huygens Institute

1905 general election: Apeldoorn
Candidate	Party	Votes	%
Frederik van Bylandt	CHP	4,147	55.13
R.A.P. Sandberg tot Essenburg	VL	2,994	39.80
Pieter Jelles Troelstra	SDAP	381	5.07
Total		7,522	100.00
Valid votes		7,522	98.83
Invalid/blank votes		89	1.17
Total votes		7,611	100.00
Registered voters/turnout		8,869	85.82
Christian Historical gain			
Source: Electoral Council, Huygens Institute

1909 general election: Apeldoorn
Candidate	Party	Votes	%
Frederik van Bylandt	CHU	4,397	61.49
J. Esmeijer	VD	2,458	34.37
J.A.H. van den Brink	SDAP	296	4.14
Total		7,151	100.00
Valid votes		7,151	99.00
Invalid/blank votes		72	1.00
Total votes		7,223	100.00
Registered voters/turnout		9,745	74.12
Christian Historical hold			
Source: Electoral Council, Huygens Institute

=== Elections in the 1910s ===
1913 general election: Apeldoorn
Candidate	Party	First round		Second round	
Candidate	Party	Votes	%	Votes	%
Frederik van Bylandt	CHU	4,172	49.12	5,095	50.44
J. Esmeijer	VD	3,155	37.15	5,007	49.56
A. Dijkgraaf	SDAP	636	7.49		
P.J. Muller	NBPK	530	6.24		
Total		8,493	100.00	10,102	100.00
Valid votes		8,493	96.39	10,102	99.46
Invalid/blank votes		318	3.61	55	0.54
Total votes		8,811	100.00	10,157	100.00
Registered voters/turnout		10,830	81.36	10,830	93.79
Christian Historical hold					
Source: Electoral Council, Huygens Institute

1916 Apeldoorn by-election
Candidate	Party	Votes	%
Reinhardt Snoeck Henkemans	CHU	5,737	55.72
J. Esmeijer	VD	4,005	38.90
K. van Trigt	Independent	554	5.38
Total		10,296	100.00
Valid votes		10,296	98.88
Invalid/blank votes		117	1.12
Total votes		10,413	100.00
Registered voters/turnout		12,078	86.21
Christian Historical hold			
Source: Electoral Council, Huygens Institute

1917 general election: Apeldoorn
Candidate	Party	Votes	%
Reinhardt Snoeck Henkemans	CHU	4,695	75.95
P.T. Hugenholtz	AG	1,487	24.05
Total		6,182	100.00
Valid votes		6,182	98.96
Invalid/blank votes		65	1.04
Total votes		6,247	100.00
Registered voters/turnout		13,064	47.82
Christian Historical hold			
Source: Electoral Council, Huygens Institute
