= Loosduinen (electoral district) =

Dutch electoral district (1888 to 1918)

Loosduinen was an electoral district of the House of Representatives in the Netherlands from 1888 to 1918.

== Profile ==
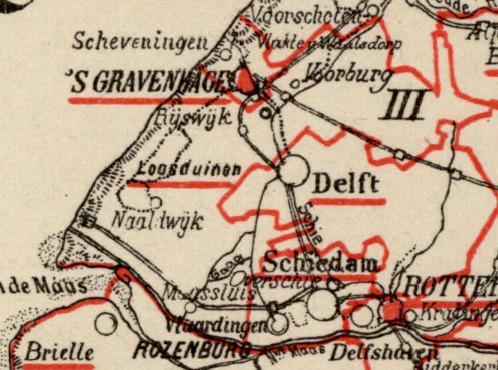
The district of Loosduinen in 1888

The electoral district of Loosduinen was created in 1888, mostly out of part of the Delft district, which was reduced from two seats to one. Fully located in the province of South Holland, it included the municipality of Loosduinen, today a part of The Hague, as well as the modern municipalities of Westland, Maassluis, Midden-Delfland, Rijswijk and Zoetermeer, and the villages of Nootdorp, Voorburg, Stompwijk and Benthuizen. It was a predominantly agricultural district.

The district's population increased considerably during its existence, from 44,115 in 1888 to 63,093 in 1909. A plurality of around 44% the population was Reformed. Catholics formed a significant majority in the district, though dropping slightly from 36% in 1888 to 33% in 1909. Another 19% of the population was Gereformeerd. The share of "Others" rose from 1.6% in 1888 to 3.6% in 1909.

The district of Loosduinen was abolished upon the introduction of party-list proportional representation in 1918.

== Members ==
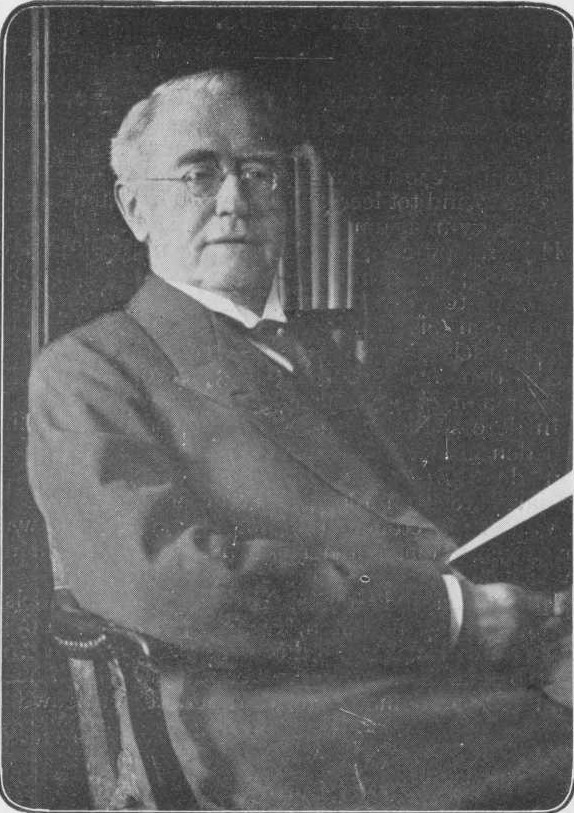
Anthony Brummelkamp Jr.

Loosduinen was a safe seat for the parliamentary right, though as a result of the district's religiously mixed population, it was contested between the Catholics and the Protestant Anti-Revolutionary Party in its early elections. In 1888, the district elected the Catholic Arnoldus van Berckel. In 1897, Van Berckel was defeated in the second round by the Anti-Revolutionary Anthony Brummelkamp Jr., who would continue to represent Loosduinen for the following two decades, until its abolition in 1918.

Election	Member	Party	Ref
1888	Arnoldus van Berckel	Ka	
1891	Arnoldus van Berckel	Ka	
1894	Arnoldus van Berckel	Ka	
1897	Anthony Brummelkamp Jr.	AR	
1901	Anthony Brummelkamp Jr.	AR	
1905	Anthony Brummelkamp Jr.	AR	
1909	Anthony Brummelkamp Jr.	AR	
1913	Anthony Brummelkamp Jr.	AR	
1917	Anthony Brummelkamp Jr.	AR	

== Election results ==
=== Elections in the 1880s ===
1888 general election: Loosduinen
Candidate	Party	First round		Second round	
Candidate	Party	Votes	%	Votes	%
Arnoldus van Berckel	Ka	1,319	38.54	2,001	59.57
Willem van Doorn	Lib	1,094	31.97	1,358	40.43
Jan Christiaan Fabius	AR	979	28.61		
Others		30	0.88		
Total		3,422	100.00	3,359	100.00
Valid votes		3,422	99.56	3,359	98.94
Invalid/blank votes		15	0.44	36	1.06
Total votes		3,437	100.00	3,395	100.00
Registered voters/turnout		3,747	91.73	3,747	90.61
Catholic gain					
Source: Kiesraad, Huygens Instituut

=== Elections in the 1890s ===
1891 general election: Loosduinen
Candidate	Party	First round		Second round	
Candidate	Party	Votes	%	Votes	%
Arnoldus van Berckel	Ka	1,226	38.51	1,355	50.07
Henri Adolphe van de Velde	AR	1,006	31.60	1,351	49.93
Hubert Philippus de Kanter	Lib	921	28.93		
Others		31	0.97		
Total		3,184	100.00	2,706	100.00
Valid votes		3,184	99.13	2,706	97.80
Invalid/blank votes		28	0.87	61	2.20
Total votes		3,212	100.00	2,767	100.00
Registered voters/turnout		3,943	81.46	3,943	70.17
Catholic hold					
Source: Kiesraad, Huygens Instituut

1894 general election: Loosduinen
Candidate	Party	First round		Second round	
Candidate	Party	Votes	%	Votes	%
Arnoldus van Berckel	Ka	1,298	46.56	1,755	54.33
Henri Adolphe van de Velde	AR	945	33.90	1,475	45.67
Jacobus Marinus Pijnacker Hordijk	Lib	527	18.90		
Others		18	0.65		
Total		2,788	100.00	3,230	100.00
Valid votes		2,788	97.86	3,230	98.12
Invalid/blank votes		61	2.14	62	1.88
Total votes		2,849	100.00	3,292	100.00
Registered voters/turnout		4,035	70.61	4,035	81.59
Catholic hold					
Source: Kiesraad, Huygens Instituut

1897 general election: Loosduinen
Candidate	Party	First round		Second round	
Candidate	Party	Votes	%	Votes	%
Arnoldus van Berckel	Ka	2,260	38.10	2,411	44.42
Anthony Brummelkamp Jr.	AR	1,603	27.02	3,017	55.58
Jacobus Marinus Pijnacker Hordijk	Lib	1,261	21.26		
G. van Herwaarden	CHK	808	13.62		
Total		5,932	100.00	5,428	100.00
Valid votes		5,932	98.67	5,428	98.51
Invalid/blank votes		80	1.33	82	1.49
Total votes		6,012	100.00	5,510	100.00
Registered voters/turnout		6,762	88.91	6,762	81.48
Anti-Revolutionary gain					
Source: Kiesraad, Huygens Instituut

=== Elections in the 1900s ===
1901 general election: Loosduinen
Candidate	Party	First round		Second round	
Candidate	Party	Votes	%	Votes	%
Joseph van Nispen tot Sevenaer	Ka	2,106	39.28	2,491	48.53
Anthony Brummelkamp Jr.	AR	1,817	33.89	2,642	51.47
J. Pattist	Lib	1,016	18.95		
Johan Diederik Six	VA	423	7.89		
Total		5,362	100.00	5,133	100.00
Valid votes		5,362	96.93	5,133	98.43
Invalid/blank votes		170	3.07	82	1.57
Total votes		5,532	100.00	5,215	100.00
Registered voters/turnout		6,917	79.98	6,917	75.39
Anti-Revolutionary hold					
Source: Kiesraad, Huygens Instituut

1905 general election: Loosduinen
Candidate	Party	Votes	%
Anthony Brummelkamp Jr.	AR	5,378	70.06
A. Ferf	Lib	2,298	29.94
Total		7,676	100.00
Valid votes		7,676	98.50
Invalid/blank votes		117	1.50
Total votes		7,793	100.00
Registered voters/turnout		8,951	87.06
Anti-Revolutionary hold			
Source: Kiesraad, Huygens Instituut

1909 general election: Loosduinen
Candidate	Party	Votes	%
Anthony Brummelkamp Jr.	AR	5,829	75.71
A. Ferf	Lib	1,550	20.13
Jan Schaper	SDAP	320	4.16
Total		7,699	100.00
Valid votes		7,699	98.18
Invalid/blank votes		143	1.82
Total votes		7,842	100.00
Registered voters/turnout		9,945	78.85
Anti-Revolutionary hold			
Source: Kiesraad, Huygens Instituut

=== Elections in the 1910s ===
1913 general election: Loosduinen
Candidate	Party	Votes	%
Anthony Brummelkamp Jr.	AR	6,234	68.94
Fridolin Marinus Knobel	VL	2,374	26.26
Jan Schaper	SDAP	434	4.80
Total		9,042	100.00
Valid votes		9,042	98.41
Invalid/blank votes		146	1.59
Total votes		9,188	100.00
Registered voters/turnout		11,107	82.72
Anti-Revolutionary hold			
Source: Kiesraad, Huygens Instituut

1917 general election: Loosduinen
Candidate	Party	Votes	%
Anthony Brummelkamp Jr.	AR		
Total			
Registered voters/turnout		13,005	–
Anti-Revolutionary hold			
Source: Kiesraad, Huygens Instituut
