= Ommen (electoral district) =

Ommen was an electoral district of the House of Representatives in the Netherlands from 1888 to 1918.

== Profile ==
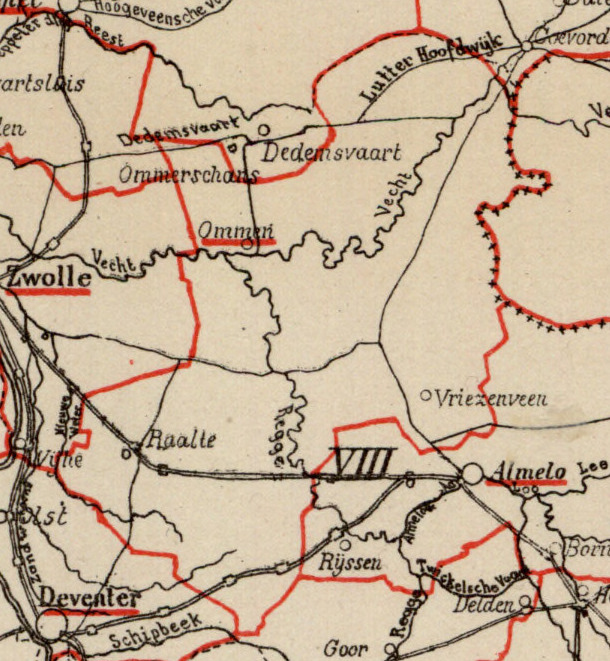
The district of Ommen in 1888

The electoral district of Ommen was created in 1888 out of parts of the districts of Zwolle, Almelo and Deventer, which were reduced from two seats to one each. Ommen's boundaries remained the same throughout the electoral district's existence. Situated in the centre of the province of Overijssel, it included the municipalities of Gramsbergen, Den Ham, Hardenberg, Hellendoorn, Holten, Ommen, Raalte and Vriezenveen. The district was predominantly agricultural.

During its existence, the district's population increased from 41,819 in 1888 to 50,116 in 1909. A majority of around 60% the population was Dutch Reformed, while Catholics constituted around 19% of the population. The proportion of the population identifying as Gereformeerd grew from 17% in 1888 to 20% in 1909, and the share of "Others" peaked at 3% in 1909.

The district of Ommen was abolished upon the introduction of party-list proportional representation in 1918.

== Members ==
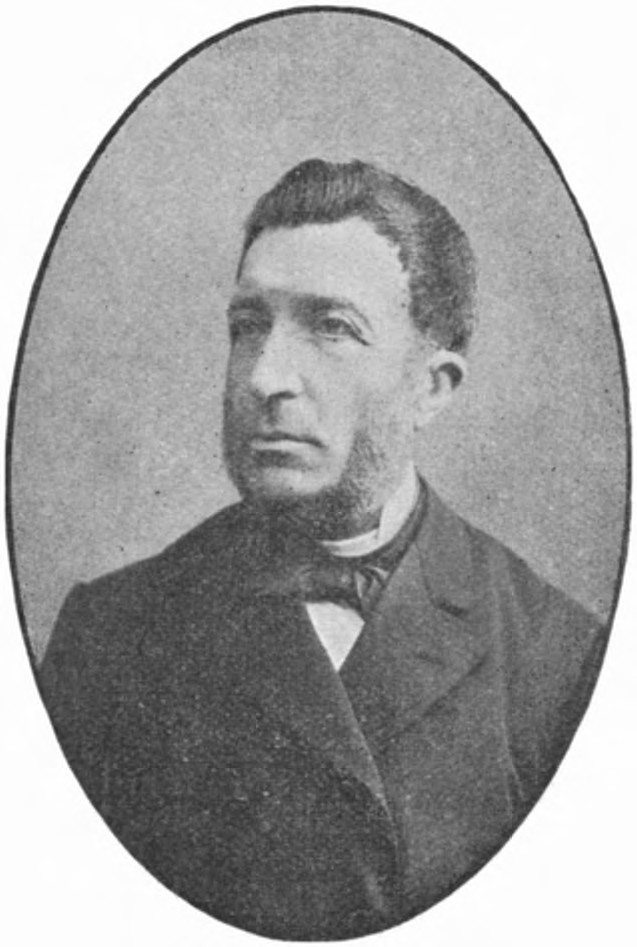
Jan van Alphen

Ommen was a safe seat for the parliamentary right. Its inaugural election was won by the Anti-Revolutionary candidate Alexander van Dedem, but he declined to take the seat, opting instead to represent the district of Zwolle. Jan van Alphen was elected to replace it would represent the district until 1908, becoming its longest-serving member. Former chairman of the Council of Ministers Abraham Kuyper represented the district between 1908 and 1912. Both Van Alphen and Kuyper served as chair of the Anti-Revolutionary parliamentary group. The last member for Ommen was the independent Christian historical Cornelis Bichon van IJsselmonde.

Election	Member	Party	Ref
1888	Alexander van Dedem	AR	
1888	Jan van Alphen	AR	
1891	Jan van Alphen	AR	
1894	Jan van Alphen	AR	
1897	Jan van Alphen	AR	
1901	Jan van Alphen	AR	
1905	Jan van Alphen	AR	
1908	Abraham Kuyper	AR	
1909	Abraham Kuyper	AR	
1912	Cornelis Bichon van IJsselmonde	OCH	
1913	Cornelis Bichon van IJsselmonde	OCH	
1917	Cornelis Bichon van IJsselmonde	OCH	

== Election results ==
=== Elections in the 1880s ===
1888 general election: Ommen
Candidate	Party	Votes	%
Alexander van Dedem	AR	1,137	57.25
G.J. van der Wijck	Lib	844	42.50
Others		5	0.25
Total		1,986	100.00
Valid votes		1,986	99.30
Invalid/blank votes		14	0.70
Total votes		2,000	100.00
Registered voters/turnout		2,326	85.98
AR gain			
Source: Electoral Council, Huygens Institute

1888 Ommen by-election
Candidate	Party	Votes	%
Jan van Alphen	AR	1,264	60.28
G.J. van der Wijck	Lib	833	39.72
Total		2,097	100.00
Valid votes		2,097	99.57
Invalid/blank votes		9	0.43
Total votes		2,106	100.00
Registered voters/turnout		2,326	90.54
AR hold			
Source: Electoral Council, Huygens Institute

=== Elections in the 1890s ===
1891 general election: Ommen
Candidate	Party	First round		Second round	
Candidate	Party	Votes	%	Votes	%
Evard van Weede van Dijkveld	Lib	845	41.22	976	45.71
Jan van Alphen	AR	765	37.32	1,159	54.29
J.H.A.M. Essink	Ka	436	21.27		
Others		4	0.20		
Total		2,050	100.00	2,135	100.00
Valid votes		2,050	99.71	2,135	99.07
Invalid/blank votes		6	0.29	20	0.93
Total votes		2,056	100.00	2,155	100.00
Registered voters/turnout		2,419	84.99	2,419	89.09
AR hold					
Source: Electoral Council, Huygens Institute

1894 general election: Ommen
Candidate	Party	Votes	%
Jan van Alphen	AR	604	51.36
Jan Willink	Lib	551	46.85
Others		21	1.79
Total		1,176	100.00
Valid votes		1,176	97.59
Invalid/blank votes		29	2.41
Total votes		1,205	100.00
Registered voters/turnout		2,415	49.90
AR hold			
Source: Electoral Council, Huygens Institute

1897 general election: Ommen
Candidate	Party	Votes	%
Jan van Alphen	AR	2,977	56.51
Johannes Theodoor de Visser	CHK	1,534	29.12
E.E. van Riemsdijk	Lib	757	14.37
Total		5,268	100.00
Valid votes		5,268	97.85
Invalid/blank votes		116	2.15
Total votes		5,384	100.00
Registered voters/turnout		6,420	83.86
Anti-Revolutionary hold			
Source: Huygens Institute

=== Elections in the 1900s ===
1901 general election: Ommen
Candidate	Party	Votes	%
Jan van Alphen	AR	2,672	65.11
T.M. Wentholt	Lib	1,432	34.89
Total		4,104	100.00
Valid votes		4,104	98.09
Invalid/blank votes		80	1.91
Total votes		4,184	100.00
Registered voters/turnout		5,997	69.77
Anti-Revolutionary hold			
Source: Electoral Council, Huygens Institute (Note: The procès-verbal states the total number of valid votes as being 4,095, nine fewer than the sum of the candidates' votes.)

1905 general election: Ommen
Candidate	Party	Votes	%
Jan van Alphen	AR	4,114	57.20
W.J.M. Engelberts	VL	3,078	42.80
Total		7,192	100.00
Valid votes		7,192	98.60
Invalid/blank votes		102	1.40
Total votes		7,294	100.00
Registered voters/turnout		8,078	90.29
Anti-Revolutionary hold			
Source: Electoral Council, Huygens Institute (Note: The procès-verbal states the total number of valid votes as being 7,189, three fewer than the sum of the candidates' votes.)

1908 Ommen by-election
Candidate	Party	Votes	%
Abraham Kuyper	AR	3,941	57.42
Theo de Meester	Lib	2,923	42.58
Total		6,864	100.00
Valid votes		6,864	98.78
Invalid/blank votes		85	1.22
Total votes		6,949	100.00
Registered voters/turnout		8,476	81.98
Anti-Revolutionary hold			
Source: Electoral Council, Huygens Institute

1909 general election: Ommen
Candidate	Party	Votes	%
Abraham Kuyper	AR	4,141	57.12
H.W. Teesselink	Lib	3,109	42.88
Total		7,250	100.00
Valid votes		7,250	98.31
Invalid/blank votes		125	1.69
Total votes		7,375	100.00
Registered voters/turnout		9,026	81.71
Anti-Revolutionary hold			
Source: Electoral Council, Huygens Institute

=== Elections in the 1910s ===
1912 Ommen by-election
Candidate	Party	Votes	%
Cornelis Bichon van IJsselmonde	OCH	4,181	54.14
H. van der Vegte	AR	3,541	45.86
Total		7,722	100.00
Valid votes		7,722	99.52
Invalid/blank votes		37	0.48
Total votes		7,759	100.00
Registered voters/turnout		8,667	89.52
OCH gain			
Source: Electoral Council, Huygens Institute

1913 general election: Ommen
Candidate	Party	First round		Second round	
Candidate	Party	Votes	%	Votes	%
Cornelis Bichon van IJsselmonde	OCH	4,469	49.26	5,078	53.00
Johannes Theodoor de Visser	CHU	4,337	47.80	4,504	47.00
G. Schotveld	SDAP	207	2.28		
B. Berends	CHU	60	0.66		
Total		9,073	100.00	9,582	100.00
Valid votes		9,073	98.05	9,582	99.49
Invalid/blank votes		180	1.95	49	0.51
Total votes		9,253	100.00	9,631	100.00
Registered voters/turnout		10,304	89.80	10,304	93.47
OCH hold					
Source: Electoral Council, Huygens Institute

1917 general election: Ommen
Candidate	Party	Votes	%
Cornelis Bichon van IJsselmonde	OCH	3,276	78.30
H.J. Kruidenier	PP	908	21.70
Total		4,184	100.00
Valid votes		4,184	98.61
Invalid/blank votes		59	1.39
Total votes		4,243	100.00
Registered voters/turnout		10,876	39.01
OCH hold			
Source: Electoral Council, Huygens Institute
