= Grave (electoral district) =

Grave was an electoral district of the House of Representatives in the Netherlands from 1848 to 1850, and again from 1888 to 1918.

== Profile ==
Grave was first created as a single-seat provisional electoral district ahead of the inaugural 1848 general election. Situated in the northeast of the province of North Brabant, its territory corresponded roughly to the modern municipalities of Oss, Maashorst and Land van Cuijk. It was named after the city of Grave. The district was disestablished again in 1850, with the area split between the existing districts of Den Bosch and Eindhoven, and the newly created district of Boxmeer.

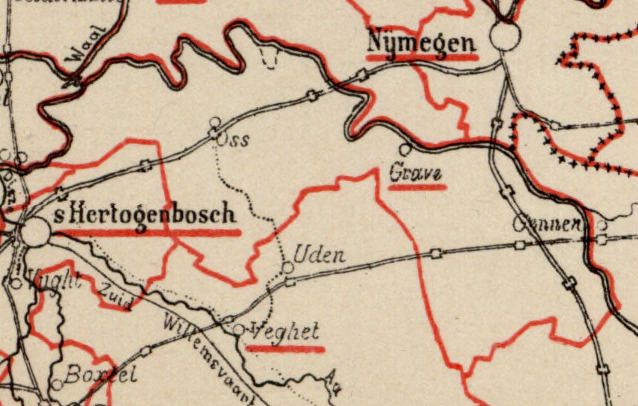
Grave in 1888

Grave was recreated as a single-seat district in 1888 out of parts of the same three districts, which were reduced from two-seat to single-seat districts. Its boundaries remained the same throughout the electoral district's existence, and were broadly similar to that of its first creation, though it lacked the area around Uden, which remained in the district of Den Bosch. The district of Grave was primarily agricultural.

In 1848, the district had a population of 22,670. Upon its recreation in 1888, it had a population of 45,384, which would gradually increase to 48,241 in 1909. Around 97% of the population was Catholic, with the remainder being mostly Dutch Reformed.

The district of Grave was abolished upon the introduction of party-list proportional representation in 1918.

== Members ==
=== First creation ===
Johannes Hengst was elected in the district of Grave in the inaugural 1848 election. Though political parties did not exist at this time, Hengst is classified as a "pragmatic" liberal.

Election	Member	Party	Ref
1848	Johannes Hengst	Independent	

=== Second creation ===
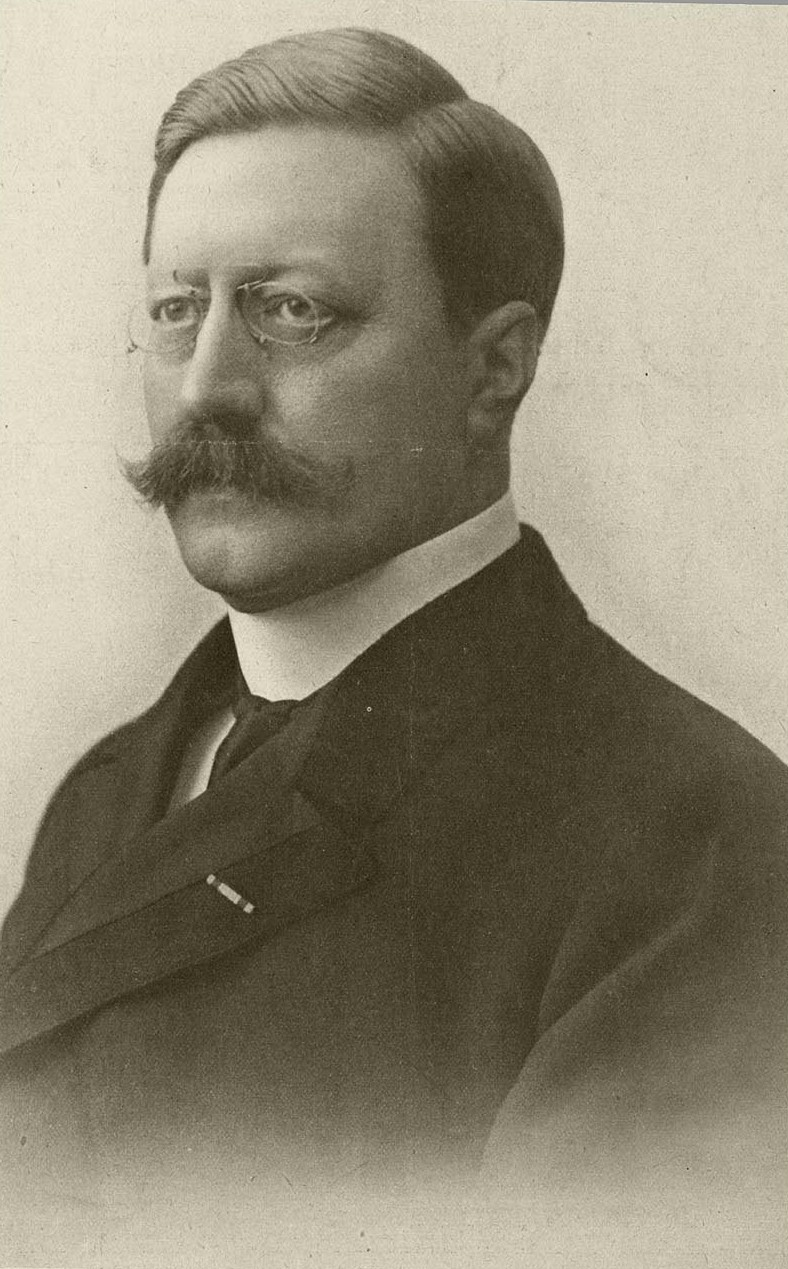
Jan Harte van Tecklenburg

Like most districts in the Catholic south of the country, Grave was a safe seat for the Catholics, who held the seat continuously throughout its existence. Jan Harte van Tecklenburg was elected as the recreated district's first deputy in 1888, and was re-elected in subsequent elections. After the 1901 general election, he was appointed minister of finance in the Kuyper cabinet, and Wilhelmus Friesen, the mayor of Grave, was elected to succeed him in a by-election. Harte van Tecklenburg attempted to win back his seat after his ministership in 1905, but he was defeated by Dionysius Koolen, chairman of the newly founded General League of Roman Catholic Electoral Associations. Koolen continued to represent Grave until its abolition in 1918.

Election	Member	Party	Ref
1888	Jan Harte van Tecklenburg	Ka	
1891	Jan Harte van Tecklenburg	Ka	
1894	Jan Harte van Tecklenburg	Ka	
1897	Jan Harte van Tecklenburg	Ka	
1901	Jan Harte van Tecklenburg	Ka	
1901	Wilhelmus Friesen	Ka	
1905	Dionysius Koolen	Ka	
1909	Dionysius Koolen	Ka	
1913	Dionysius Koolen	Ka	
1917	Dionysius Koolen	Ka	

== Election results ==
=== Elections in the 1840s ===
1848 general election: Grave
Candidate	Party	Votes	%
Johannes Hengst	Independent	412	54.00
R.J.N. Walter	Independent	242	31.72
Johannes Luyben	Independent	88	11.53
Others		21	2.75
Total		763	100.00
Valid votes		763	99.48
Invalid/blank votes		4	0.52
Total votes		767	100.00
Registered voters/turnout		959	79.98
Independent gain			
Source: Electoral Council, Huygens Institute

=== Elections in the 1880s ===
1888 general election: Grave
Candidate	Party	Votes	%
Jan Harte van Tecklenburg	Ka	2,007	95.53
Others		94	4.47
Total		2,101	100.00
Valid votes		2,101	98.41
Invalid/blank votes		34	1.59
Total votes		2,135	100.00
Registered voters/turnout		3,265	65.39
Catholic gain			
Source: Electoral Council, Huygens Institute

=== Elections in the 1890s ===
1891 general election: Grave
Candidate	Party	Votes	%
Jan Harte van Tecklenburg	Ka	1,551	94.06
Others		98	5.94
Total		1,649	100.00
Valid votes		1,649	98.80
Invalid/blank votes		20	1.20
Total votes		1,669	100.00
Registered voters/turnout		3,397	49.13
Catholic hold			
Source: Electoral Council, Huygens Institute

1894 general election: Grave
Candidate	Party	Votes	%
Jan Harte van Tecklenburg	Ka	1,304	94.29
Others		79	5.71
Total		1,383	100.00
Valid votes		1,383	98.57
Invalid/blank votes		20	1.43
Total votes		1,403	100.00
Registered voters/turnout		3,403	41.23
Catholic hold			
Source: Electoral Council, Huygens Institute

1897 general election: Grave
Candidate	Party	Votes	%
Jan Harte van Tecklenburg	Ka		
Total			
Registered voters/turnout		6,230	–
Catholic hold			
Source: Electoral Council, Huygens Institute

=== Elections in the 1900s ===
1901 general election: Grave
Candidate	Party	Votes	%
Jan Harte van Tecklenburg	Ka		
Total			
Registered voters/turnout		6,108	–
Catholic hold			
Source: Electoral Council, Huygens Institute

1901 Grave by-election
Candidate	Party	Votes	%
Wilhelmus Friesen	Ka		
Total			
Registered voters/turnout		6,108	–
Catholic hold			
Source: Electoral Council, Huygens Institute

1905 general election: Grave
Candidate	Party	First round		Second round	
Candidate	Party	Votes	%	Votes	%
Dionysius Koolen	Ka	2,499	49.51	3,001	55.26
Jan Harte van Tecklenburg	Ka	2,270	44.98	2,430	44.74
J.M.P. Broeder	Ka	278	5.51		
Total		5,047	100.00	5,431	100.00
Valid votes		5,047	97.90	5,431	98.96
Invalid/blank votes		108	2.10	57	1.04
Total votes		5,155	100.00	5,488	100.00
Registered voters/turnout		6,414	80.37	6,414	85.56
Catholic hold					
Source: Electoral Council, Huygens Institute

1909 general election: Grave
Candidate	Party	Votes	%
Dionysius Koolen	Ka		
Total			
Registered voters/turnout		6,821	–
Catholic hold			
Source: Electoral Council, Huygens Institute

=== Elections in the 1910s ===
1913 general election: Grave
Candidate	Party	Votes	%
Dionysius Koolen	Ka		
Total			
Registered voters/turnout		7,308	–
Catholic hold			
Source: Electoral Council, Huygens Institute

1917 general election: Grave
Candidate	Party	Votes	%
Dionysius Koolen	Ka		
Total			
Registered voters/turnout		7,755	–
Catholic hold			
Source: Electoral Council, Huygens Institute
