= Tietjerksteradeel (electoral district) =

Tietjerksteradeel was an electoral district of the House of Representatives in the Netherlands from 1897 to 1918.

== Profile ==
The electoral district of Tietjerksteradeel was created in 1897 as a continuation of the district of Bergum. Its boundaries corresponded with that of Bergum, comprising the rural municipalities of Achtkarspelen, Kollumerland, Smallingerland and Tietjerksteradeel in the province of Friesland. It was a predominantly agricultural district.

The district's population grew from 44,324 in 1897 to 48,150 in 1909. Roughly half the population was Dutch Reformed, dropping slightly from 53.5% in 1897 to 49.5% in 1909. Another 39% of the population identified as Gereformeerd, while in 1909, 7.6% of the population did not identify with any denomination. Catholics constituted a negligible minority in the district.

The district of Tietjerksteradeel was abolished upon the introduction of party-list proportional representation in 1918.

== Members ==
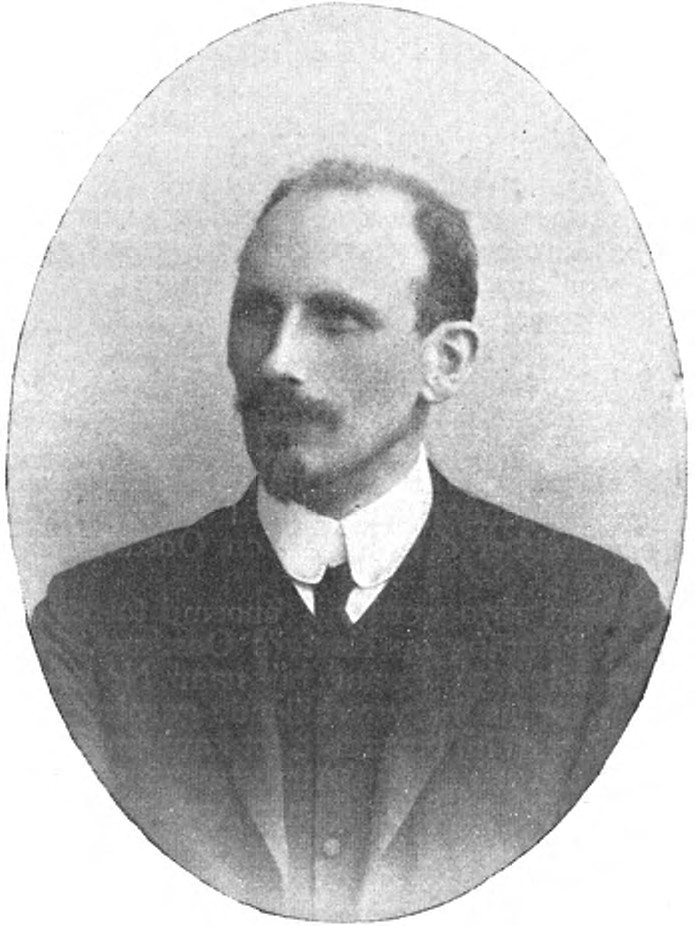
Van der Voort van Zijp in 1909

In its inaugural election, Tietjerksteradeel elected Pieter Jelles Troelstra, leader of the Social Democratic Workers' Party. In the following election, however, he was defeated by the Anti-Revolutionary candidate Syb Talma. Talma was appointed Minister of Agriculture, Industry and Commerce in 1908, triggering a by-election which was won by Coenraad van der Voort van Zijp, who would go on to become the district's longest-serving representative, serving until its abolition in 1918.

Election	Member	Party	Ref
1897	Pieter Jelles Troelstra	SDAP	
1901	Syb Talma	AR	
1905	Syb Talma	AR	
1908	Coenraad van der Voort van Zijp	AR	
1909	Coenraad van der Voort van Zijp	AR	
1913	Coenraad van der Voort van Zijp	AR	
1917	Coenraad van der Voort van Zijp	AR	

== Election results ==
=== Elections in the 1890s ===
1897 general election: Tietjerksteradeel
Candidate	Party	First round		Second round	
Candidate	Party	Votes	%	Votes	%
J.D. de Vries	AR	1,867	43.93	2,432	47.65
Pieter Jelles Troelstra	SDAP	1,149	27.04	2,672	52.35
Hubert Philippus de Kanter	Lib	842	19.81		
Luutzen de Vries	CHK	392	9.22		
Total		4,250	100.00	5,104	100.00
Valid votes		4,250	99.28	5,104	99.03
Invalid/blank votes		31	0.72	50	0.97
Total votes		4,281	100.00	5,154	100.00
Registered voters/turnout		5,968	71.73	5,968	86.36
SDAP gain					
Source: Electoral Council, Huygens Institute

=== Elections in the 1900s ===
1901 general election: Tietjerksteradeel
Candidate	Party	Votes	%
Syb Talma	AR	3,025	55.55
Pieter Jelles Troelstra	SDAP	1,247	22.90
Hubert Philippus de Kanter	Lib	1,174	21.56
Total		5,446	100.00
Valid votes		5,446	99.20
Invalid/blank votes		44	0.80
Total votes		5,490	100.00
Registered voters/turnout		6,234	88.07
AR gain			
Source: Electoral Council, Huygens Institute

1905 general election: Tietjerksteradeel
Candidate	Party	Votes	%
Syb Talma	AR	3,851	53.22
Hendrik Goeman Borgesius	Lib	1,916	26.48
Pieter Jelles Troelstra	SDAP	1,469	20.30
Total		7,236	100.00
Valid votes		7,236	99.37
Invalid/blank votes		46	0.63
Total votes		7,282	100.00
Registered voters/turnout		7,880	92.41
AR hold			
Source: Electoral Council, Huygens Institute

1908 Tietjerksteradeel by-election
Candidate	Party	Votes	%
Coenraad van der Voort van Zijp	AR	3,825	54.72
Pieter Rink	Lib	1,663	23.79
Willem Vliegen	SDAP	1,502	21.49
Total		6,990	100.00
Valid votes		6,990	99.47
Invalid/blank votes		37	0.53
Total votes		7,027	100.00
Registered voters/turnout		8,169	86.02
AR hold			
Source: Electoral Council, Huygens Institute

1909 general election: Tietjerksteradeel
Candidate	Party	Votes	%
Coenraad van der Voort van Zijp	AR	4,029	58.41
H.J. Romeijn	Lib	1,636	23.72
Willem Vliegen	SDAP	1,233	17.87
Total		6,898	100.00
Valid votes		6,898	99.27
Invalid/blank votes		51	0.73
Total votes		6,949	100.00
Registered voters/turnout		8,358	83.14
AR hold			
Source: Electoral Council, Huygens Institute

=== Elections in the 1910s ===
1913 general election: Tietjerksteradeel
Candidate	Party	Votes	%
Coenraad van der Voort van Zijp	AR	4,137	51.87
J.H. Faber	Lib	2,238	28.06
Willem Vliegen	SDAP	1,601	20.07
Total		7,976	100.00
Valid votes		7,976	98.97
Invalid/blank votes		83	1.03
Total votes		8,059	100.00
Registered voters/turnout		8,967	89.87
AR hold			
Source: Electoral Council, Huygens Institute (Note: The procès-verbal states the total number of valid votes as being 7,975, one fewer than the sum of the candidates' votes.)

1917 general election: Tietjerksteradeel
Candidate	Party	Votes	%
Coenraad van der Voort van Zijp	AR	3,764	81.77
M.C. van Wijhe	SDP	839	18.23
Total		4,603	100.00
Valid votes		4,603	99.31
Invalid/blank votes		32	0.69
Total votes		4,635	100.00
Registered voters/turnout		9,796	47.32
AR hold			
Source: Electoral Council, Huygens Institute
