= Bergum (electoral district) =

Bergum was an electoral district of the House of Representatives in the Netherlands from 1888 to 1897.

== Profile ==
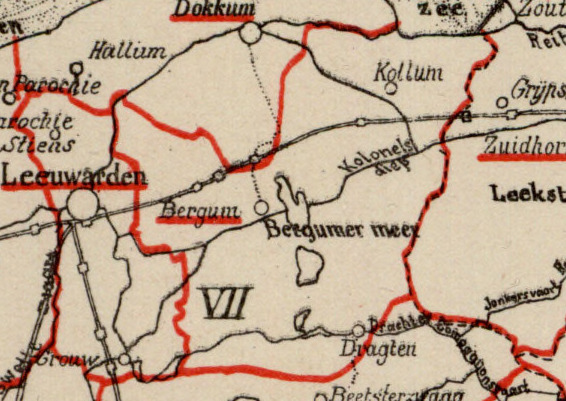
The district of Bergum in 1888

The electoral district of Bergum was created in 1888 out of part of the Dokkum district, which was reduced from two seats to one. Fully situated in the province of Friesland, Bergum comprised the rural municipalities of Achtkarspelen, Kollumerland, Smallingerland and Tietjerksteradeel. It was a predominantly agricultural district.

Upon its creation, the district had a population of 42,419. 57.2% of the population was Reformed, while 34.4% was Gereformeerd. The proportion of Catholics in the district was negligible. 8.3% of the population had another religious affiliation or none.

The district of Bergum was reconstituted as the district of Tietjerksteradeel in 1897.

== Members ==
Bergum elected the Anti-Revolutionary Okke Tietes Bosgra in 1888, but he died a few months into the parliamentary term. Luutzen de Vries held the district for the Anti-Revolutionary Party in the subsequent by-election, but he was defeated by the Liberal Hubert Philippus de Kanter in the 1891 general election. De Kanter continued to represent the district until its abolition in 1897.

Election	Member	Party	Ref
1888	Okke Tietes Bosgra	AR	
1888	Luutzen de Vries	AR	
1891	Hubert Philippus de Kanter	Lib	
1894	Hubert Philippus de Kanter	Lib	

== Election results ==
=== Elections in the 1880s ===
1888 general election: Bergum
Candidate	Party	Votes	%
Okke Tietes Bosgra	AR	1,374	50.35
Egbert Broer Kielstra	Lib	1,232	45.14
O. Stellingwerf	Soc	95	3.48
Others		28	1.03
Total		2,729	100.00
Valid votes		2,729	99.89
Invalid/blank votes		3	0.11
Total votes		2,732	100.00
Registered voters/turnout		3,019	90.49
Anti-Revolutionary gain			
Source: Kiesraad, Huygens Instituut

1888 Bergum by-election
Candidate	Party	Votes	%
Luutzen de Vries	AR	1,340	51.62
Egbert Broer Kielstra	Lib	1,125	43.34
V. Bruinsma	Independent	130	5.01
Others		1	0.04
Total		2,596	100.00
Valid votes		2,596	98.93
Invalid/blank votes		28	1.07
Total votes		2,624	100.00
Registered voters/turnout		3,019	86.92
Anti-Revolutionary hold			
Source: Kiesraad, Huygens Instituut

=== Elections in the 1890s ===
1891 general election: Bergum
Candidate	Party	First round		Second round	
Candidate	Party	Votes	%	Votes	%
Luutzen de Vries	AR	1,294	49.11	1,363	47.36
Hubert Philippus de Kanter	Lib	1,211	45.96	1,515	52.64
J.A. Fortuyn	Soc	129	4.90		
Others		1	0.04		
Total		2,635	100.00	2,878	100.00
Valid votes		2,635	99.77	2,878	99.97
Invalid/blank votes		6	0.23	1	0.03
Total votes		2,641	100.00	2,879	100.00
Registered voters/turnout		3,076	85.86	3,076	93.60
Liberal gain					
Source: Kiesraad, Huygens Instituut (1, 2)

1894 general election: Bergum
Candidate	Party	Votes	%
Hubert Philippus de Kanter	Lib	1,123	51.07
Abraham Kuyper	AR	811	36.88
Ulrich Herman Huber	AR	257	11.69
Others		8	0.36
Total		2,199	100.00
Valid votes		2,199	99.41
Invalid/blank votes		13	0.59
Total votes		2,212	100.00
Registered voters/turnout		2,987	74.05
Liberal hold			
Source: Kiesraad, Huygens Instituut
