= Hubert Philippus de Kanter =

Dutch politician (1844–1906)

- De Kanter, c. 1906

Member of the House of Representatives
- In office 15 September 1891 – 21 September 1897
- Preceded by: Luutzen de Vries
- Succeeded by: Constituency abolished
- Constituency: Bergum

Personal details
- Born: July 19, 1844 Brielle, Netherlands
- Died: July 14, 1906 (aged 61) Haarlem, Netherlands
- Party: Liberal Union
- Education: Leiden University

Hubert Philippus de Kanter (19 July 1844 – 14 July 1906) was a Dutch politician who served as a member of the House of Representatives for Bergum from 1891 until 1897.

== Biography ==
Hubert Philippus de Kanter was born in Brielle to the preacher and securities broker also named Hubert Philippus, and Johanna Alida van Andel. He studied Roman and contemporary law at Leiden University from 23 September 1862, and received his doctorate on 8 June 1866 with a dissertation entitled Onderzoek naar de regtsgeldigheid van het Code Rural ("Research into the legal validity of the Code Rural"). After his studies, De Kanter moved back to Brielle to become a solicitor and barrister as an associate of his brother-in-law Jacob Dirk Veegens, and became deputy district judge of Brielle in 1871. In addition, he served on the municipal council of Brielle from 1871 and on the Provincial Council of South Holland from 1883, and worked as school inspector from 1878. In November 1890, he moved to Haarlem and worked there as a solicitor and barrister, and as the director of a fire insurance society for agricultural workers.

De Kanter's position in Haarlem was short-lived, as he was elected to the House of Representatives in the 1891 general election. As the candidate of the Liberal Union, he defeated the incumbent member Luutzen de Vries in the northern rural district of Bergum, and took office on 15 September 1891. In the House, he gained a reputation as a self-assured, articulate member on the progressive wing of the Liberal Union. He frequently spoke on matter relted to the interior, judicial affairs and finance. In 1893, he joined the Suffrage Club in parliament, which advocated extension of suffrage, and in 1896 he voted against interior minister Samuel van Houten's suffrage bill, which progressives believed did not go far enough. In the 1897 general election, De Kanter was defeated by Pieter Jelles Troelstra, leader of the Social Democratic Workers' Party. Several subsequent attempts to return to the House of Representatives were unsuccessful, though he was elected to the Provincial Council of North Holland in 1898, and remained there until his death in 1906.

Hubert Philippus de Kanter was married first to Johanna Dorothea Rebecca van Hasselt, and later to Romelia Rutgers van der Loeff, and had five children. He belonged to the liberal wing of the Dutch Reformed Church.

== Electoral history ==
House of Representatives
Election	Electoral district	First round		Second round		Result
Election	Electoral district	Votes	%	Votes	%	Result
1886	Gorinchem	1,127	17.8%	—		Lost
1891	Apeldoorn	1,022	44.4%	—		Lost
1891	Bergum	1,211	46.0%	1,515	52.6%	Won
1891	Loosduinen	921	28.9%	—		Lost
1894	Haarlemmermeer	535	21.3%	—		Lost
1894	Bergum	1,123	51.1%	—		Won
1897	Tietjerksteradeel	842	19.8%	—		Lost
1900	Haarlem	685	20.7%	—		Lost
1901	Apeldoorn	2,071	40.7%	—		Lost
1901	Bergen op Zoom	531	16.5%	—		Lost
1901	Tietjerksteradeel	1,174	21.6%	—		Lost
1901	Gouda	2,048	43.4%	—		Lost
1901	Harlingen	1,245	24.6%	—		Lost
