= Dion Koolen =

Dutch politician

His Excellency Dion Koolen
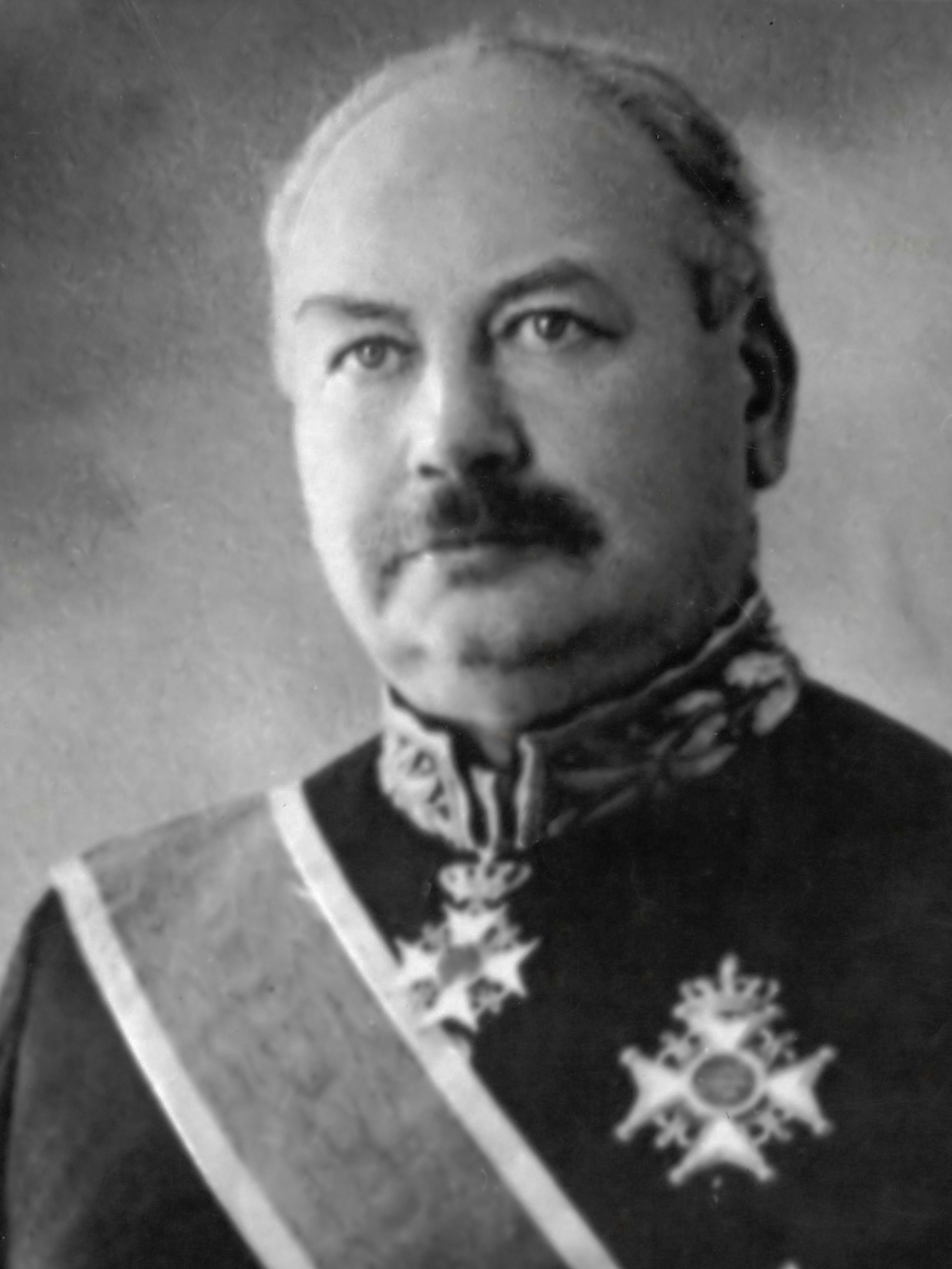
- Koolen in 1925

Member of the Council of State
- In office 1 May 1926 – 24 March 1945
- Vice President: See list: Wilhelmus Frederik van Leeuwen (1926–1928) Alex van Lynden van Sandenburg (1828–1932) Frans Beelaerts van Blokland (1933–1945)

Minister of Labour, Commerce and Industry
- In office 4 August 1925 – 8 March 1926
- Prime Minister: Hendrikus Colijn
- Preceded by: Piet Aalberse
- Succeeded by: Jan Rudolph Slotemaker de Bruïne

Speaker of the House of Representatives
- In office 14 October 1920 – 5 August 1925
- Preceded by: Dirk Fock
- Succeeded by: Charles Ruijs de Beerenbrouck

Member of the House of Representatives
- In office 19 September 1905 – 5 August 1925
- Preceded by: Wilhelmus Friesen
- Constituency: Grave (1905–1918)

Personal details
- Born: Dionysius Adrianus Petrus Norbertus Koolen; 21 January 1871 Rijswijk, Netherlands
- Died: 24 March 1945 (aged 74) Voorschoten, Netherlands
- Party: Roman Catholic State Party (from 1926)
- Other political affiliations: General League (until 1926)
- Spouse: Maria Zumgahr (m. 1896)
- Children: 4 sons and 3 daughters
- Education: Utrecht University
- Occupation: Politician · Civil servant · Jurist · Lawyer · Prosecutor · Judge · Academic administrator

Dionysius Adrianus Petrus Norbertus "Dion" Koolen (21 January 1871 – 24 March 1945) was a Dutch Roman Catholic politician who served as a member of the House of Representatives from 1905 until 1925, as minister of Labour, Commerce and Industry between 1925 and 1926, and as a member of the Council of State from 1926 until his death in 1945. He was a member of the General League of Roman Catholic Electoral Associations and its successor, the Roman Catholic State Party (RKSP).

== Early life and career ==
Dionysius Koolen was born in Rijswijk on 21 January 1871 to Petrus Norbertus Koolen, a civil servant of Staatsspoorwegen, and Maria Gezina Kooimans. He attended a gymnasium in Utrecht and studied at Utrecht University, obtaining a doctorate on 2 October 1894 with a thesis entitled De Kapitaalrente ("Capital Interest"). He settled in the same city as a lawyer and public prosecutor in 1897, and was appointed as school inspector the following year. In 1903, he was appointed to the Central Board of Appeal, and later served as its chairman.

== Political career ==
Since the start of his professional career, Koolen worked for the founding of a Catholic political party. After his promotion, Koolen became the chairman of the Catholic electoral association in Utrecht, and subsequently served as deputy chairman of the provincial league of Catholic electoral associations. He stood as a candidate in the 1901 general election in the electoral district of Utrecht II, but was defeated by Joan Röell in the second round. In 1904, he carried out preparatory work for the founding of the General League of Roman Catholic Electoral Associations on 15 October of that year. He would subsequently chair the party until 1918.

Koolen was first elected to the House of Representatives in the 1905 general election in the electoral district of Grave, defeating the district's previous deputy Jan Harte van Tecklenburg. He was accused of abusing his power as party chairman to sidestep Harte van Tecklenburg, who had previously been promised the Catholic candidacy in the district, but Koolen denied these charges. He was re-elected unopposed in 1909, 1913 and 1917. In 1918 and 1922, he was re-elected off the Catholic candidate list. In the House, he spoke on matters of finances, labour, education and water management. He was considered to be a representative of the Roman Catholic right; his admiration of Hendrikus Colijn earned him the nickname "Catholic Colijn" in the press.

Koolen was considered for the position of Speaker of the House of Representatives in 1918, 1919 and 1920. In October 1920 he was elected, receiving 43 votes out of 84 votes cast. He took office on 14 October of that year, succeeding Dirk Fock. As Speaker of the House, he distinguined himself by his accuracy, strictness and formality, but at times pushed his personal convictions more than was deemed appropriate for the office. In 1923, a cabinet crisis broke out after the Fleet Act was rejected by a majority in the House of Representatives, including ten rebel Catholic MPs. Queen Wilhelmina tasked Koolen with forming a new cabinet, but the lack of cooperation of the Anti-Revolutionaries and some Catholics compelled him to return his assignment to the Queen. After subsequent failed formation attempts, the Queen rejected the cabinet's resignation request, and the cabinet continued to serve its term.

On 4 August 1925, Koolen was appointed Minister of Labour, Commerce and Industry in the short-lived Colijn I cabinet. He was subsequently appointed to the Council of State, taking office on 1 May 1926. He remained in this office until his death on 24 March 1945.

== Decorations ==
Honours
| Ribbon bar | Honour | Country | Date | Comment |
|---|---|---|---|---|
| | Commander of the Order of the Netherlands Lion | Netherlands | 1923 | Elevated from Knight (1913) |
| | Knight Grand Cross of the Order of St. Gregory the Great | Holy See | 1927 | |

House of Representatives of the Netherlands
| Preceded by Wilhelmus Friesen | Member for Grave; 1905–1918 | District abolished |
Political offices
| Preceded by Dirk Fock | Speaker of the House of Representatives; 1920–1925 | Succeeded by Charles Ruijs de Beerenbrouck |
| Preceded by Piet Aalberse | Minister of Labour, Commerce and Industry; 1925–1926 | Succeeded by Jan Rudolph; Slotemaker de Bruïne |
