= Syb Talma =

Dutch politician

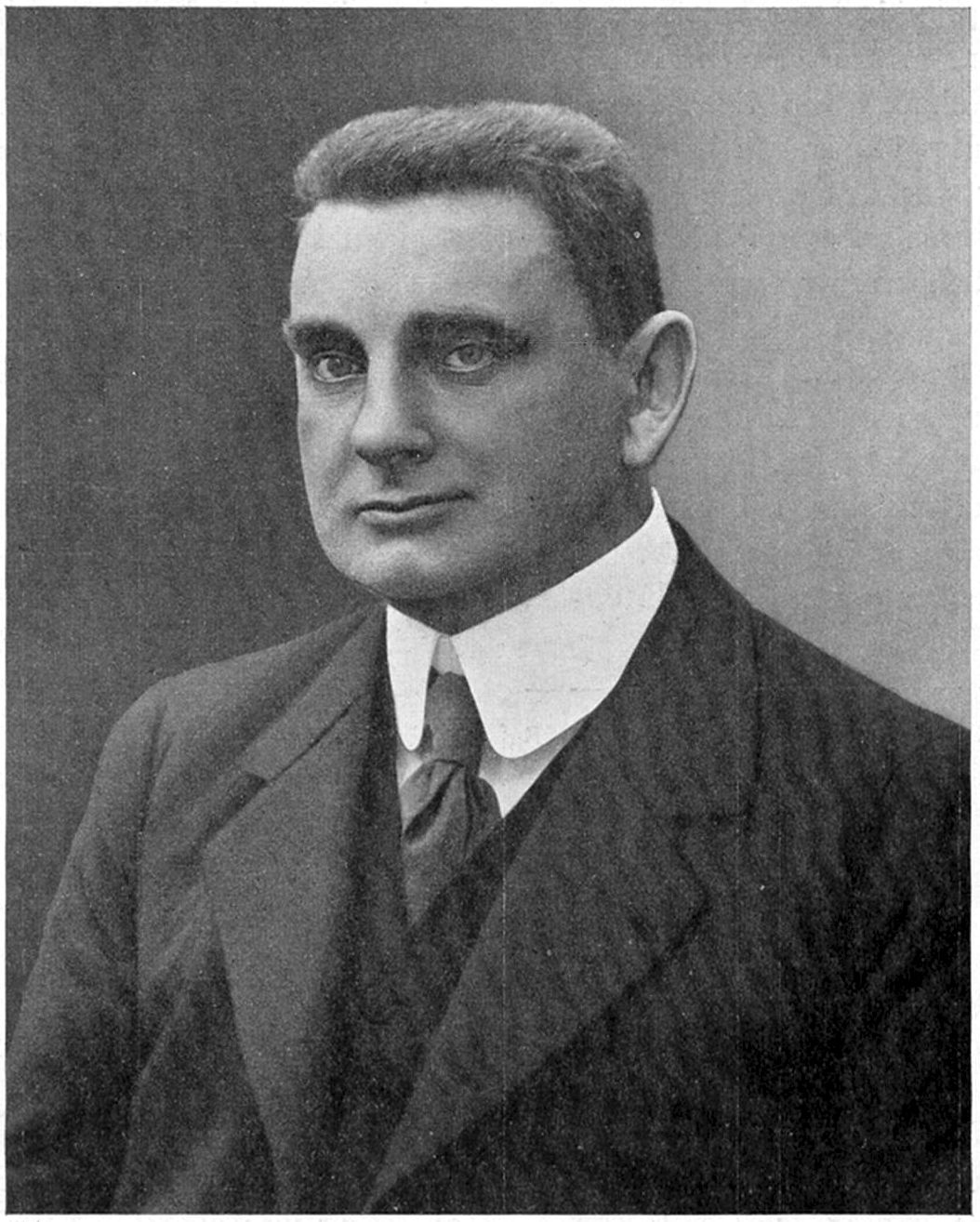
Syb Talma c. 1910

Aritius Sybrandus (Syb) Talma (17 February 1864, in Angeren – 12 July 1916, in Bennebroek) was a Dutch Christian minister and politician of the Anti-Revolutionary Party who served as a member of the House of Representatives for Tietjerksteradeel from 1901 and 1908, and as Minister of Agriculture, Industry and Commerce in the Theo Heemskerk cabinet between 1908 and 1913.

House of Representatives of the Netherlands
Preceded by Pieter Jelles Troelstra	Member for Tietjerksteradeel; 1901–1908	Succeeded by Coenraad van der Voort van Zijp
