= Coalition for Christian Outreach =

US nonprofit campus ministry

Coalition for Christian Outreach (CCO) is a nonprofit campus ministry headquartered in Pittsburgh, Pennsylvania. CCO was officially incorporated on March 23, 1971. As of September 2012, the CCO employs 225 staff members on 104 campuses and universities, primarily in Pennsylvania, Ohio, and West Virginia. Activities at the campuses can include Bible study, working for humanitarian causes such as Habitat for Humanity, etc. For nine consecutive years, the CCO has been named a Best Christian Workplace in the US by the Best Christian Workplace Institute.

== History ==
The CCO’s first official church partnership was created in 1971 with Graystone Presbyterian Church to reach students at Indiana University of Pennsylvania. In 1973, the CCO placed staff members as residence hall directors at both Waynesburg College (now University) and Robert Morris College (now University).

== Jubilee conference ==
CCO hosts its annual Jubilee conference every February in Pittsburgh, Pennsylvania, described as "one of the biggest assemblies of Christian youth.". It normally draws 2000 or more students and features a wide variety of religious and social topics. Notable speakers have included Chuck Colson, Michael Gerson, and others.
