= Coenraad van der Voort van Zijp =

Dutch minister and politician (1871–1935)

- Coenraad van der Voort van Zijp in 1923

Member of the House of Representatives
- In office 19 March 1908 – 15 September 1925
- Preceded by: Syb Talma
- Succeeded by: seat abolished
- Constituency: Tietjerksteradeel (until 1918)

Mayor of Maartensdijk
- In office 1 November 1924 – 28 September 1935
- Preceded by: Edouard Quarles van Ufford
- Succeeded by: Roelof Tjalma

Personal details
- Born: 8 December 1871 Dordrecht, Netherlands
- Died: 28 September 1935 (aged 63) Utrecht, Netherlands
- Party: ARP; National Union (1924–1926?); Dutch Orange-Nationalists (1925–1928); NSB (1932–1934)
- Spouse: Jacomijntje Saarloos
- Education: Utrecht University

Coenraad van der Voort van Zijp (8 December 1871 – 28 September 1935) was a Dutch Reformed minister and politician. He was a member of the Dutch House of Representatives for the Anti-Revolutionary Party (ARP) from 1908 to 1925, serving as the ARP's parliamentary leader from 1913 to 1918. After leaving the House of Representatives and being appointed mayor of Maartensdijk, Van der Voort van Zijp became involved with several small right-wing authoritarian groups in the middle of the 1920s and eventually turned towards fascism, joining the National Socialist Movement (NSB) in 1932. He became one of its most prominent early members and remained loyal to its ideals despite being forced to leave the party in 1934.

== Early life ==
Coenraad van der Voort van Zijp was born on 8 December 1871 in Dordrecht to Willem Bruines van Zijp, a merchant captain, and Wilhelmina Francina van Leer. After completing secondary education at the municipal Gymnasium in Dordrecht in 1894, Van der Voort van Zijp studied theology at Utrecht University from 1894 to 1898. In 1899, he was ordained as a minister in the Dutch Reformed Church, serving in the parishes of Vuren, Dedem, and later in Doesburg.

== Political career ==
=== MP and ARP parliamentary leader ===
Van der Voort van Zijp began his political career as a member of the Anti-Revolutionary Party (ARP). He ran in the Arnhem electoral district in the 1905 Dutch general election, but was defeated. was first elected to the House of Representatives in 1908, representing the Tietjerksteradeel electoral district. He was the ARP's spokesperson on naval affairs, and in September 1913 he became the ARP's parliamentary leader. He became intimately involved in the school struggle and the ARP's advocacy for religious education, and after its resolving in 1917 began to question whether the division (antithese) between Christian and secular political parties should be broken. Van der Voort van Zijp stepped down as parliamentary leader in 1919, and lost much of his influence within the ARP after.

In November 1924, Van der Voort van Zijp was appointed as mayor of the town of Maartensdijk, in the province of Utrecht. During his mayoral term, Van der Voort van Zijp presided over the building of almost 450 new houses in Maartensdijk, today part of the neighborhood of Tuindorp in the city of Utrecht.

=== Turn towards fascism ===
In September 1924, Van der Voort van Zijp was one of several noted political figures to co-found the National Union, a right-wing authoritarian group focused around a small group of intellectuals including Carel Gerretson and Robert Frédéric Groeninx van Zoelen. The National Union advocated closer political cooperation between Christian and liberal political parties, but did not seek to form a new party of its own nor support any existing political movement. The National Union encouraged its members to cast a blank ballot, which led Van der Voort van Zijp and several fellow-minded members to eventually exit the movement. His involvement had led the ARP branch in Tietjerksteradeel to call for his resignation from the House of Representatives, and Van der Voort van Zijp left the House that year. By 1927, Van der Voort van Zijp was no longer a member of the National Union.

In 1925, Van der Voort van Zijp founded the Dutch Orange-Nationalists (Nederlandse Oranje-Nationalisten), a small conservative and authoritarian group made up mostly of right-wing military officers and government employees and which included figures such as Cornelis van Geelkerken. The Orange-Nationalists found little support outside of its small elite membership, and was effectively disbanded by late 1928.

=== Involvement with the NSB ===
In early 1932, Van der Voort van Zijp joined the National Socialist Movement (NSB), where he soon became known as the second in command of the party. Van der Voort van Zijp (member no. 213 of the NSB), was highly active within the party, performing even menial tasks such as signing up new members and printing the NSB's newspaper Volk en Vaderland. He saw the NSB as a movement to promote national unity among the Dutch people and which recognized Christianity as its national religion. He was the first speaker at the 1933 NSB party convention, and likely also contributed part of his personal wealth to the party.

In late 1933, Van der Voort van Zijp unexpectedly retreated from public activity for the NSB in a letter to its leader Anton Mussert, who reacted with surprise at his decision. Van der Voort van Zijp never publicly spoke on his decision. Soon after this, at the end of 1933, Van der Voort van Zijp spoke at an NSB meeting in Goes, where he insulted the "Jewish" municipal government of Amsterdam. The incident led to Minister of Internal Affairs Jacob Adriaan de Wilde being questioned by Evert Kupers of the Social Democratic Workers' Party. A year later, De Wilde banned government employees from membership in the NSB, and Van der Voort van Zijp publicly left the party, though he continued to sympathize with the NSB.

== Death and legacy ==
Van der Voort van Zijp died on 28 September 1935 in Utrecht. In an issue of Volk en Vaderland, Mussert described Van der Voort van Zijp as "a Dutch National Socialist of the purest crystal" and "an exceptional member of the Fatherland", and showed sympathy for his decision to leave the NSB. After Van der Voort van Zijp was buried in the presence of his loved ones, a second ceremony was held with nearly 800 NSB members led by Cornelis van Geelkerken in attendance, who commemorated Van der Voort van Zijp's life.

A street in Maartensdijk, today part of the city of Utrecht, was named after Van der Voort van Zijp in 1935, and caused controversy in 2024, with the socialist youth movement ROOD publicly protesting the name by symbolically renaming it after resistance fighter Hannie Schaft. The local public school was also named after Van der Voort van Zijp, but was renamed in 1985.

== Personal life ==
Van der Voort van Zijp was married to Jacomijntje Saarloos. He belonged to the orthodox-Protestant wing of the Dutch Reformed Church.

== Bibliography ==
- te Slaa, Robin; Klijn, Edwin (2021) [First edition 2009]. De NSB: Ontstaan en opkomst van de Nationaal-Socialistische Beweging, 1931-1935 (in Dutch) (3 ed.). Boom. ISBN 978-90-244-4303-1.
