= Henk Kummeling =

Dutch professor of law (born 1961)

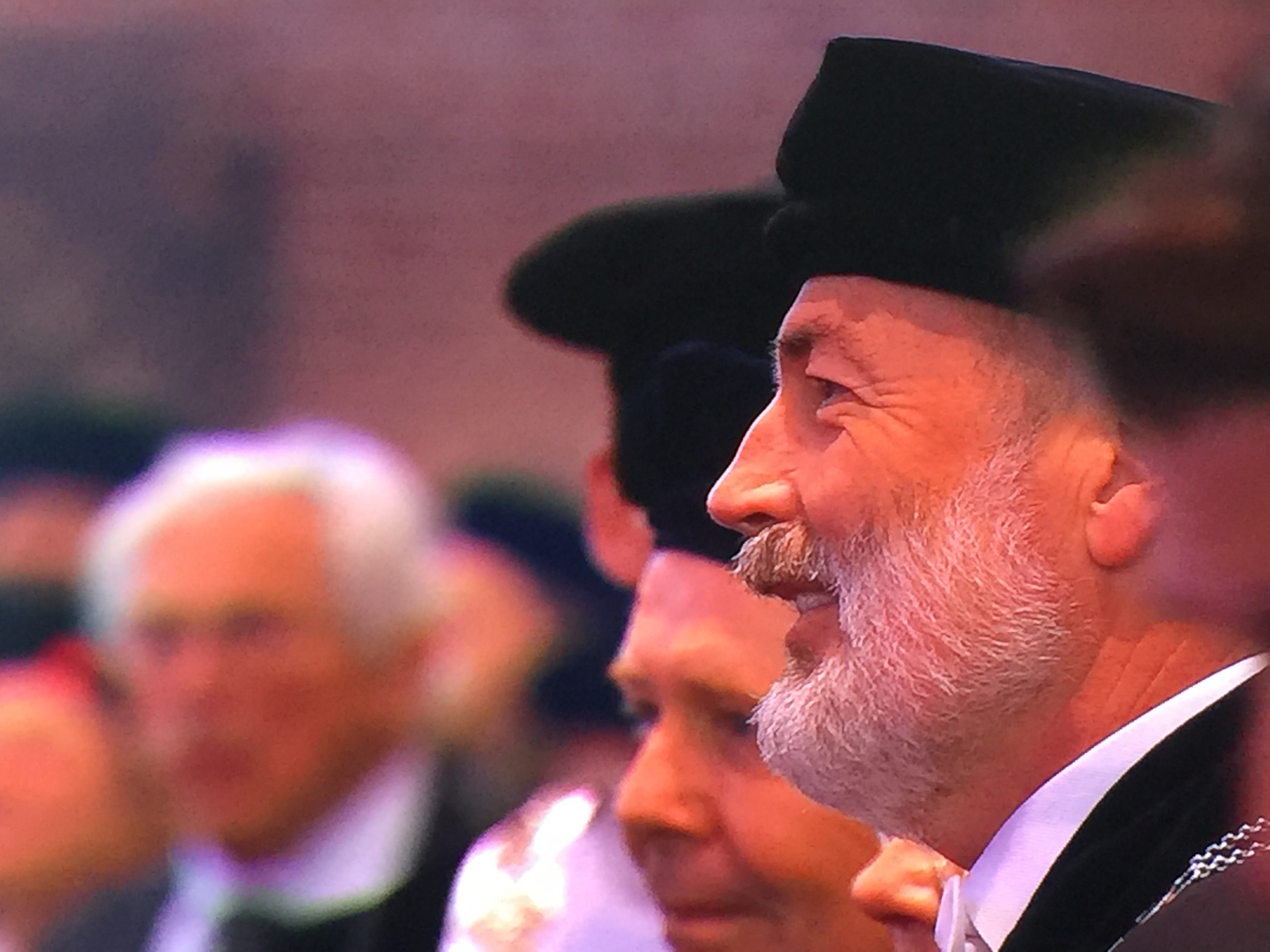
- Kummeling (2025)
- Born: Hendrikus Rutgerus Bernardus Maria Kummeling; 1961
- Known for: Rector of Utrecht University and chair of CoARA

Hendrikus Rutgerus Bernardus Maria (Henk) Kummeling (born 10 January 1961) is a Dutch law professor. From 2005 until 2016 he was chair of the Dutch National Electoral Council. Since 2018 he is rector of Utrecht University, and since December 2024 is the chair of the Coalition on Advancing Research Assessment (CoARA).

== Biography ==
Kummeling studied law at the Radboud University Nijmegen where he obtained a PhD in 1988 under the supervision of Constantijn Kortmann. He worked as a scientist at the Radboud University Nijmegen and Utrecht University. In 1994 he was appointed parttime professor of Constitutional Law and Administrative Law at Tilburg University. In 1995 he was appointed full professor of Constitutional Law and Comparative Constitutional Law at Utrecht University, where he was dean of the Faculty of Law, Economics and Governance from 2008 until 2014. In 2015 he was appointed distinguished professor of Utrecht University (Dutch: universiteitshoogleraar), which is a Dutch honorary university function. Since 1 June 2018 Kummeling is rector of Utrecht University.

From 2005 until 2016 he was chair of the Dutch National Electoral Council (Dutch: Kiesraad), the highest electoral authority in the Netherlands. He chaired the State Committee on Rule of Law, established by the cabinet, parliament, and judicial branch in response to political scandals that harmed public trust such as the childcare benefits scandal, induced earthquakes in Groningen due to gas extraction, and the nitrogen crisis. It concluded in June 2024 that trust in the government had been damaged by a neglect of the rule of law and by overly-complicated rules and procedures.

On Dec 9, 2024 he was appointed chair of the Coalition for Advancing Research Assessment, a collective of organisations committed to reforming the methods and processes by which research, researchers, and research organisations are evaluated.
