= Pieter Jelles Troelstra =

Dutch politician

- Piter Jelles Troelstra
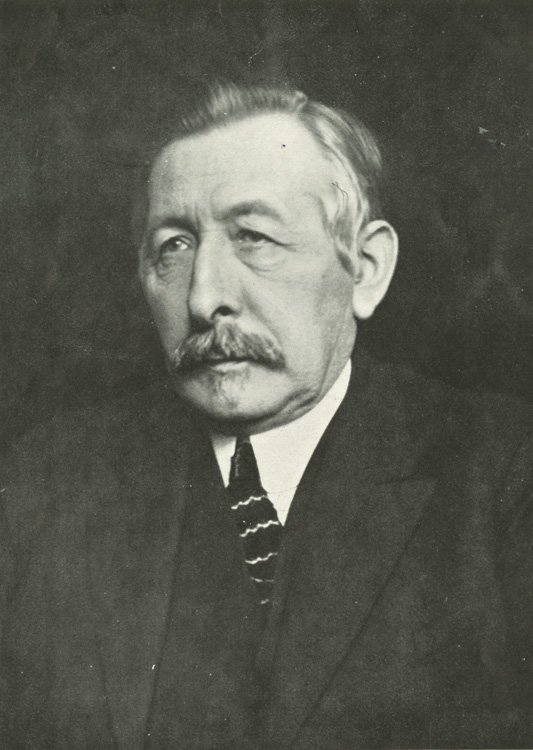
- Portrait of Troelstra, 1926
- Born: 20 April 1860; Leeuwarden
- Died: 12 May 1930 (aged 70); The Hague
- Education: University of Groningen
- Occupation: Lawyer
- Notable work: Gedenkschriften, vols.I–IV
- Political party: Social Democratic Workers' Party
- Other political affiliations: Friese Volkspartij, Social Democratic League
- Spouse: Sjoukje Maria Diderika Bokma de Boer
- Children: Jelle Troelstra
- Father: Jelle Troelstra sr.
- Awards: Piter Jellespriis

Signature
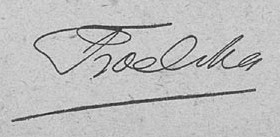

Pieter Jelles Troelstra (Dutch pronunciation: [ˈpitər ˈjɛləs ˈtrulstraː]; 20 April 1860 – 12 May 1930) was a Dutch lawyer, journalist and politician active in the socialist workers' movement. He is most remembered for his fight for universal suffrage and his failed call for revolution at the end of World War I.

== Early and personal life ==
Troelstra was born 20 April 1860 in Leeuwarden and grew up in the village of Stiens, where his father was a liberal tax inspector. He was an ethnic Frisian, and his name is styled in the traditional Frisian way: first name ("Pieter", because of his Frisian writings, is often written as "Piter", as it is spelled in Frisian), patronymic ("Jelles", meaning "son of Jelle"), family name (Troelstra).

He went on to study law at the University of Groningen. After graduation, he settled in Leeuwarden as a lawyer. He became involved in politics and the workers' movement through a Frisian movement, later to be known as the Friese Volkspartij (Frisian People's Party). He had originally joined this movement because of his poetry and interest in the West Frisian language. Through the movement and his work as a lawyer, he got into the social democratic part of this wide movement.

From 1888 to 1904, Troelstra was married to Sjoukje Bokma de Boer, a well-known children's book writer under the pen name of Nienke van Hichtum, with whom he had two children, one being Jelle Troelstra.He advocated for equal voting rights, supporting the first-wave feminist movement, and expressed anti-racist viewpoints notable for the era.

== Involvement with SDB ==
In 1890, Troelstra joined the Social Democratic League (SDB), an early Dutch socialist movement under the leadership of Ferdinand Domela Nieuwenhuis. In time, he got into conflict with the anarchist tendencies of the movement. In 1893, the SDB took a decisive anti-parliamentary stance, and Troelstra no longer believed it could do any useful socialist work.

== Founding of SDAP ==
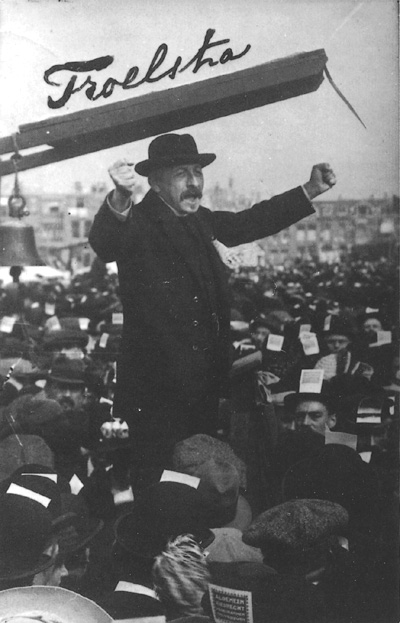
Pieter Jelles Troelstra (about 1912)

After trying to get some members of the SDB to join him, he was one of the twelve men who started the Social Democratic Workers' Party (SDAP) in 1894. Unlike the old SDB, the SDAP was more like its German counterpart, then still also named the SDAP, which was taking a more reformist course, trying to get social law implemented, while still keeping the ideal of revolution up.

From around 1903 he and Henri Polak edited the Sociale Bibliotheek book series, whose publisher in 1914 was the Commissie voor de Schriftelijke Propaganda Brochurenhandel S.D.A.P. in Amsterdam.

== Hogerhuis Case ==
In 1897, Troelstra, who now earned a living as a lawyer, got involved in the infamous Hogerhuis Case concerning three brothers (Keimpe, Wybren and Marten Hogerhuis) who were being prosecuted for the burglary of a rich farmer. Although the evidence against the brothers was shaky at best, they were nonetheless sentenced to lengthy prison terms, leading to accusations of class justice (legal discrimination based on wealth or education).

Troelstra was the member of parliament for the district of Leeuwarden, close to the men's village of Beetgum, and was drawn into the case after the brothers' conviction. He collected additional evidence, which he published in socialist newspapers. One of his revelations was that soon after the burglary, three men had quickly emigrated to America and Germany. However, Troelstra did not manage to get the case retried. The affair gained fame, particularly in socialist circles, as the Dutch pendant of the French Dreyfus Affair, and Troelstra's role was, perhaps not coincidentally, not unlike that played by Émile Zola. Despite the failure of his efforts (the brothers served most of their sentence), they contributed to Troelstra's reputation and goodwill in the Frisian countryside.

== SDAP leader ==
Troelstra was inclusive in his outlook. As leader of the parliamentary faction of the SDAP, he did not insist upon a tight party line. That permitted a period of harmony within the SDAP between 1894 and 1900.

Both within and outside parliament, the SDAP proved to be a powerful force, despite its relatively small representation in the House of Representatives. However, the socialists felt a moral advantage because parliament was hardly an accurate representation of the people, and they used their possibilities to the full, among other things by filibustering (each representative had unlimited speaking time). When, in 1911 a majority of parliament refused to vote on an SDAP motion, the anger of the party was expressed by one of its most fiery speakers, Jan Schaper:

In that case, the inkwells will fly through the room.... I cannot be held accountable for anything. I assure you, we will start throwing chairs.

The antagonism between the SDAP and more conservative forces would cause bitterness for a long time afterwards and also explains many of Troelstra's actions.

== 1913 elections and universal suffrage ==
Troelstra's biggest political issue was universal suffrage in the Netherlands. This struggle reached its climax in 1910 to 1913. After electoral success in the 1913 general election, the SDAP was offered a place in a coalition government. The proposed coalition had plans for universal suffrage, but a party congress renounced such a close co-operation with its traditional enemy. Some MPs, such as the SDAP's co-founders Willem Vliegen and Schaper, were very distraught over what they saw as a tactical disaster. Vliegen wrote in 1934:

I have never been able to prefer a government without social democrats over one with them, as evident as it may be that one cannot entertain all company. I still think that the refusal to accept government responsibility in 1913 is one of the most significant errors the SDAP ever made.

There is evidence to suggest that Troelstra himself was rather relieved; he had only reluctantly supported the request for government participation. Universal suffrage was eventually steered through parliament in 1917, by the liberal minority cabinet of Pieter Cort van der Linden.

== Red Week (November 1918) ==
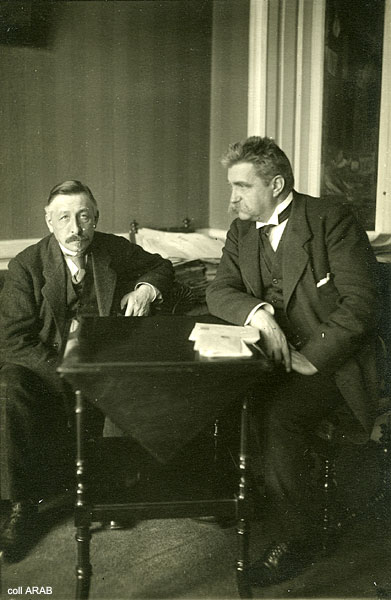
Swedish Social Democratic leader Hjalmar Branting (right) and Pieter Jelles Troelstra (left) during the 1917 Stockholm Peace Conference

Inspired by the Russian Revolution of 1917 and the German Revolution of 1918–1919, Troelstra made a historic if ill-advised move. In November 1918, he used a speech in the traditional worker stronghold of Rotterdam to call for a socialist revolution in the Netherlands. However, it was not followed up by any revolutionary activity on the side of other SDAP activists, who were as surprised by Troelstra's declaration as most other people. The government, on the other hand, reacted quickly and sent troops to the major cities. In addition, a counter-campaign was set up to emphasise loyalty to the House of Orange.

By that time, it had become clear that the attempted revolution, for which Troelstra had gathered very little support even among his own party, had failed. The events are known as the Red Week (Dutch: Roode Week) or, more commonly, "Troelstra's mistake" (Dutch: Vergissing van Troelstra).

== Later life ==
After all this Troelstra was broken and stayed at home, but a party conference two weeks later received him with a standing ovation. Although he could defend the position that the party had never had actual plans for a coup, his reputation had taken irreparable damage, both inside and outside the party.

The SDAP would not be invited to form any other government until the national cabinet of 1939. However, the establishment and the right wing had been frightened. In the next cabinet, under Hendrikus Colijn, social reforms were started to reduce discontent and to deny the socialists further support.

Troelstra is still an inspirational figure for many in the Dutch workers' movement.

He withdrew from politics in 1925 and devoted much time, despite ever declining health, to dictating his memoirs to his secretary, the later Amsterdam alderman Herman Bernard Wiardi Beckman. These memoirs (Gedenkschriften), which appeared in four volumes (Genesis, Growth, Surf and Storm) after 1925, almost became part of the furniture in the houses of many Dutch workers, further testimony to Troelstra's reputation among his followers.

Troelstra died 12 May 1930 in The Hague. The section in The Hague of the Labour Party, the successor of the SDAP, celebrates at a monument to Troelstra.

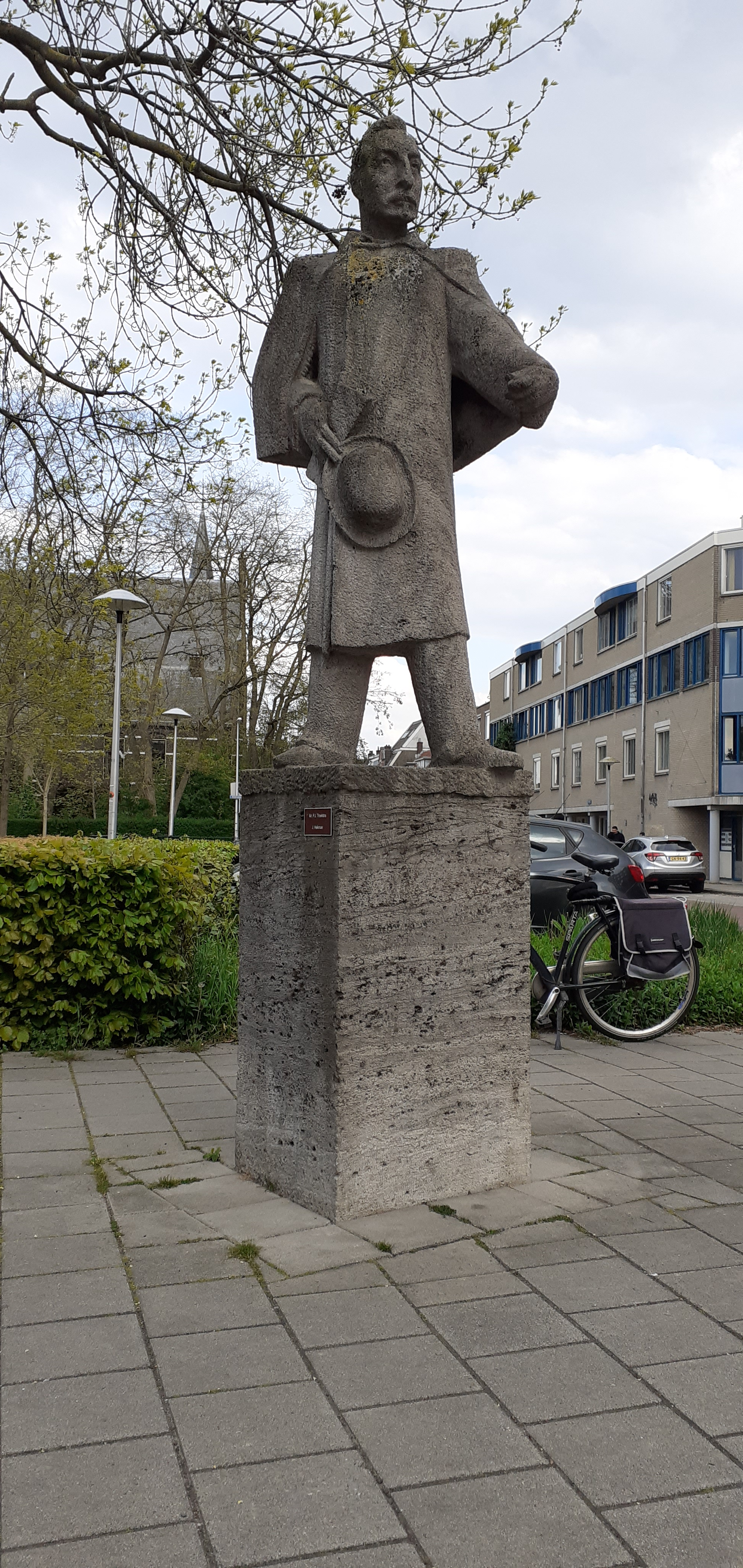
Statue of Pieter Jelles Troelstra in Utrecht

== Electoral history ==
House of Representatives, 1894–1918
Election	Electoral district	First round		Second round		Result
Election	Electoral district	Votes	%	Votes	%	Result
1894	Utrecht	40	1.1%	—		Lost
1897	Leeuwarden	939	23.8%	1,872	50.9%	Won
1897	Tietjerksteradeel	1,149	27.0%	2,672	52.5%	Won
1897	Utrecht I	442	9.6%	—		Lost
1897	Utrecht II	444	13.0%	—		Lost
1897	Winschoten	1,216	28.4%	2,276	58.6%	Won
1901	Amsterdam VI	230	6.9%	—		Lost
1901	Franeker	1,527	28.6%	—		Lost
1901	Tietjerksteradeel	1,247	22.9%	—		Lost
1901	Utrecht I	935	18.7%	—		Lost
1901	Zuidhorn	723	15.2%	—		Lost
1901	Veendam	1,663	40.9%	2,292	46.0%	Lost
1902	Amsterdam IX	2,050	37.2%	3,231	49.2%	Lost
1902	Amsterdam III	2,476	49.7%	3,397	56.7%	Won
1905	Amsterdam III	3,837	48.3%	4,564	56.9%	Won
1905	Apeldoorn	381	5.1%	—		Lost
1905	Bodegraven	330	4.2%	—		Lost
1905	Brielle	477	7.2%	—		Lost
1905	Goes	216	4.0%	—		Lost
1905	Tietjerksteradeel	1,469	20.3%	—		Lost
1909	Amsterdam III	4,680	49.2%	5,691	56.3%	Won
1909	Haarlem	989	12.2%	—		Lost
1909	Leeuwarden	2,529	37.1%	2,740	42.7%	Lost
1909	Rotterdam II	1,205	14.3%	—		Lost
1909	Utrecht I	961	13.6%	—		Lost
1913	Amsterdam III	7,309	57.2%	—		Won
1913	Dokkum	591	7.8%	—		Lost
1913	Haarlem	2,755	27.8%	—		Lost
1913	Leeuwarden	3,738	46.5%	3,851	56.2%	Won
1917	Leeuwarden	4,266	87.4%	—		Won

House of Representatives, 1918–1922
Election	Electoral district	List	Pos.	Votes	Result		Ref.
Election	Electoral district	List	Pos.	Votes	List seats	Individual	Ref.
1918	IX. Amsterdam	5.	1.	30,896	2	Won	
1918	XIV. Leeuwarden	12.	1.	26,216	2	Won	
1922	IX. Amsterdam	36.	1.	80,914	3	Won	

House of Representatives of the Netherlands
New district	Member for Tietjerksteradeel; 1897–1901	Succeeded by Syb Talma
Preceded by Cornelis Herman den Hertog	Member for Amsterdam III; 1902–1913	Succeeded by Henri Polak
Preceded by Lodewijk Thomson	Member for Leeuwarden; 1913–1918	District abolished
