= Kuyper College =

Private, Christian college in Michigan, U.S.

- Motto: Ora et labora (Latin)
- Motto in English: Pray and work
- Type: Private college
- Established: 1939 as Reformed Bible Institute
- Religious affiliation: Reformed Protestant (Calvinism)
- President: Patricia R. Harris
- Students: 127
- Location: Grand Rapids, Michigan, United States; 43.02214°N 85.59264°W
- Colors: Purple and Gold
- Nickname: Cougars
- Sporting affiliations: NCCAA Division II – Mid-West
- Website: kuyper.edu

Kuyper College is a private Reformed Christian college in Grand Rapids, Michigan.

== History ==
Kuyper College was founded in 1939 as Reformed Bible Institute. RBI had a three-year curriculum that offered a track into foreign and domestic missions. In 1970, after a five-year redesign of the curriculum and programs, the Michigan Department of Education gave the school the right to confer a four-year Bachelor degree. As a result, RBI changed its name to Reformed Bible College. On April 21, 2006, RBC changed its name to Kuyper College after Abraham Kuyper.

== Academics ==
Kuyper has degree programs within a Reformed perspective. The student-to-faculty ratio is 11 to 1.

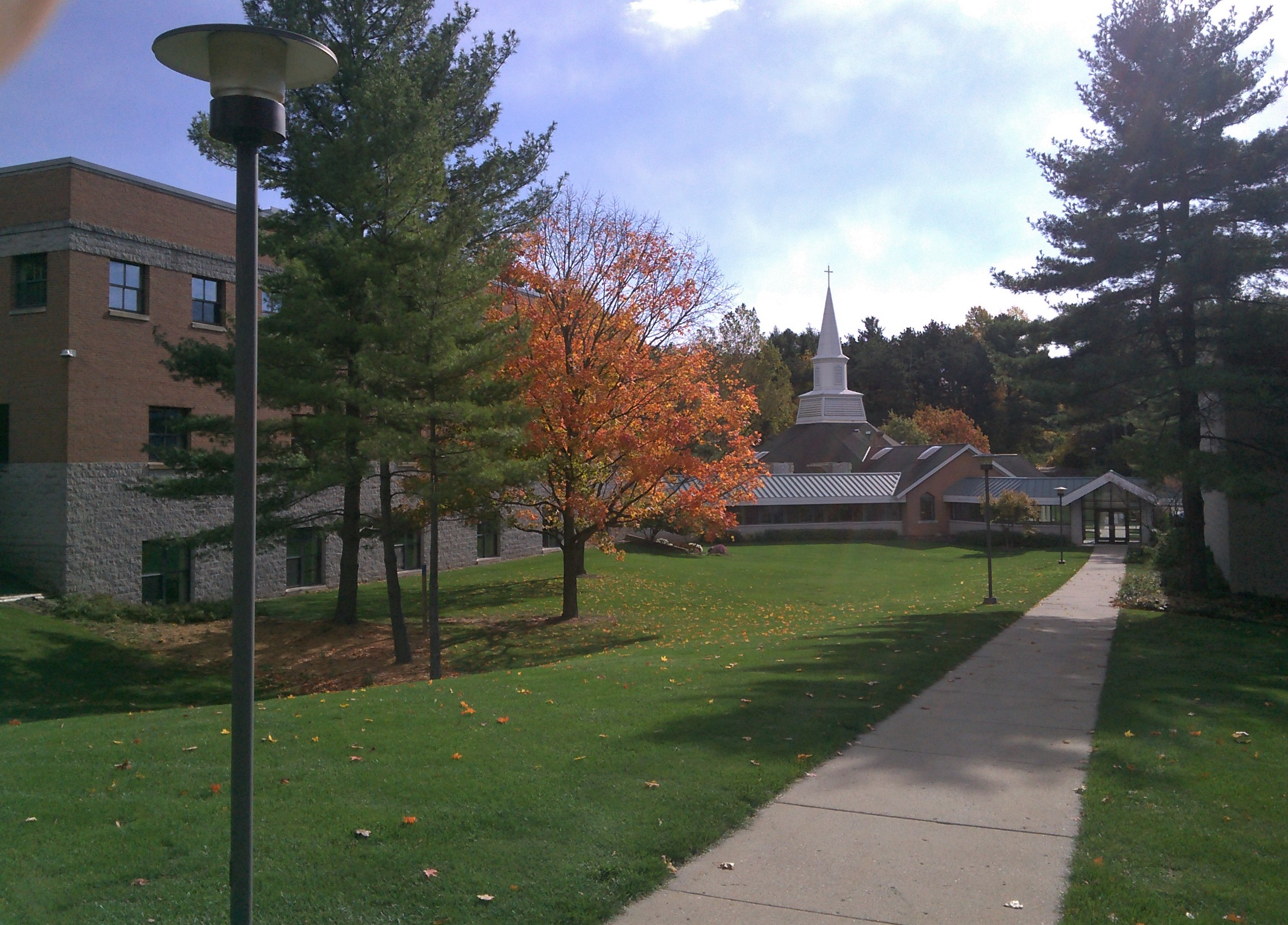
Kuyper College in 2020

In 2023, the school's enrollment was 127 students.

== Accreditation ==
Kuyper is accredited by the Association for Biblical Higher Education and the Higher Learning Commission. The social work program is also accredited by the Council on Social Work Education.

The college is a member of the National Association of Christian College Admissions Personnel and holds affiliate membership within the Council for Christian Colleges and Universities.

== Sources ==
- Grand Rapids Press, Friday, April 21, 2006
