= Huub Franssen =

Dutch politician (1916–2003)

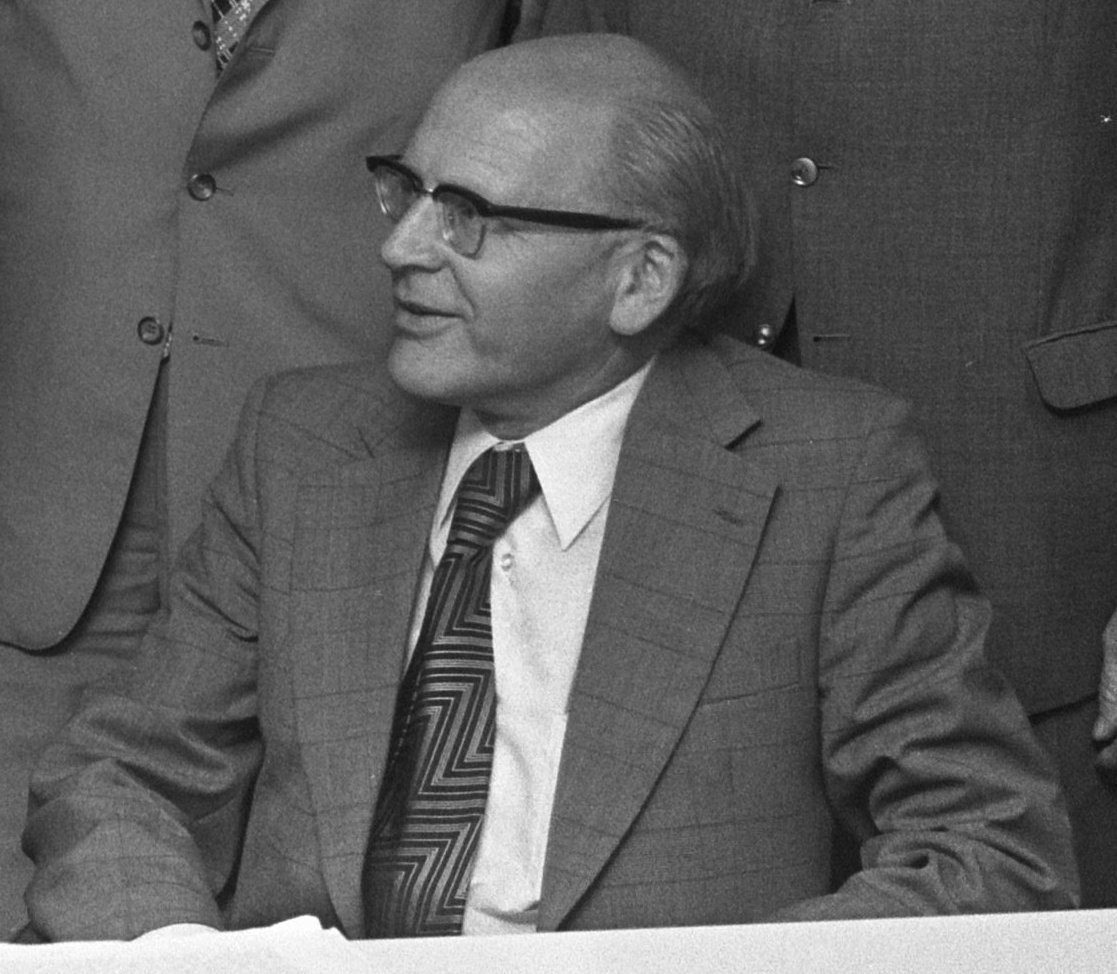
- Huub Franssen in 1975

Member of the House of Representatives
- In office 23 October 1956 – 8 June 1977

Personal details
- Born: Hubertus Martinus Franssen; 9 August 1916 Amersfoort, Netherlands
- Died: 3 August 2003 (aged 86) Assen, Netherlands
- Party: PvdA
- Spouse: Henderika Bartina van Dijk
- Children: 4
- Education: Leiden University

Hubertus Martinus "Huub" Franssen (9 August 1916 – 3 August 2003) was a Dutch politician and writer. Franssen was a member of the Dutch House of Representatives from 1956 to 1977 for the Labour Party (PvdA). He became known for his strong opposition to Dutch membership in NATO and nuclear weapons, and was recognized by fellow MPs for his knowledge of parliamentary procedure.

== Early life ==
Huub Franssen was born on 9 August 1916 in Amersfoort to Jacobus Wilhelmus Johannes Franssen and Cornelia Dekker. He was raised as a member of the Reformed Churches of the Netherlands, his parents being members of the Anti-Revolutionary Party, but joined the Dutch Reformed Church later in life. In 1936, Franssen began working as an employee of the municipality of Ermelo. During World War II, Franssen was a part of the Dutch resistance, and was imprisoned in St. Michelgestel from 1942 to 1943.

After World War II, Franssen became a socialist, and joined the Social Democratic Workers' Party and in 1946 the Labour Party (PvdA), where he became chairman of a Protestant working group within the party. That same year, Franssen began working for the Association of Netherlands Municipalities, where he would work until 1950. He also studied law at Leiden University, graduating in 1950.

From 1950 to 1956, Franssen worked for the provincial government of Drenthe, until 1951 as head administrator concerned with provincial finances and from 1951 to 1956 as head of the administrative staff of the Queen's commissioner of Drenthe.

== Political career ==
Franssen was first elected to the House of Representatives following the 1956 Dutch general election. As an MP, Franssen focused on internal affairs, where he became an expert on municipal law and finance, policing, social work and foreign affairs.

Throughout his political career, Franssen was a strong anti-militarist. He opposed the De Quay cabinet's policy on Dutch New Guinea, and in 1963 voted against the placing of West German soldiers on Dutch soil.

He was a strong opponent of Dutch membership in NATO, and of nuclear weapons. At the 1967 congress of the PvdA, Franssen submitted a proposal along with Han Lammers for the Netherlands to leave NATO, but the proposal was defeated. He was an early advocate of Dutch diplomatic recognition of the German Democratic Republic, and in 1970 was part of the minority of PvdA MPs to vote in favor of recognizing North Vietnam. In 1976, he was one of a few PvdA MPs to vote in favor of motions to leave NATO and to denuclearise the Dutch armed forces.

He also held independent positions on ethical issues from his PvdA colleagues, for instance voting against proposals in 1968 to increase state lottery prizes, and in 1973 to legalize casinos. In 1976, Franssen was one of two PvdA MPs to vote against a proposal to expand abortion access, due to his opinion that the foremost task of the government was the protection of life.

While he never played a central political role as MP, Franssen became known among his colleagues for his expertise on the Dutch parliamentary system and procedure. He led efforts to open closed budgetary sessions of the House of Representatives to the public in the interest of transparency, but his efforts with Ed van Thijn to allow municipalities to issue recommendations in regards to the government's selection of mayors were unsuccessful.

In the later half of the 1960s, Franssen joined the PvdA's party executive as vice-chairman. In 1971, Franssen ran for the position of chairperson of the PvdA, but was defeated by André van der Louw. In 1977, Franssen retired from the House of Representatives.

Franssen also held several political functions at the local and provincial level. From 1958 to 1966, Franssen was a member of the municipal council of Assen. In the late 1970s, Franssen served as interim mayor of Smilde from 1977 to 1978, and as a member of the Provincial Council of Drenthe from 1978 to 1979.

== Later life ==
On 22 December 1981, Franssen obtained his PhD. at Leiden University. His dissertation was written about the relationship between the government and the House of Representatives on the subject of internal affairs. In the years after, Franssen wrote extensively on parliamentary affairs and history.

Huub Franssen died on 3 August 2003 in Assen.

== Personal life ==
Franssen was married to Henderika Bartina van Dijk, with whom he had two daughters and two sons.

== Bibliography ==
- Hoetink, Carla (2018). Macht der gewoonte: regels en rituelen in de Tweede Kamer na 1945 (in Dutch). Nijmegen: Uitgeverij Vantilt. ISBN 9789460042768.
- Visser, Gerald (2003). "Huub Franssen, Kamerlid met karakter én kenner van de Kamer". In van Baalen, C.C. (ed.). Jaarboek Parlementaire Geschiedenis 2003 – Emotie in de politiek (in Dutch). Amsterdam: Boom. pp. 150–154. ISBN 9012099676.
