= Frederik van Bylandt =

Dutch politician (1841–1924)

- Frederik van Bylandt in 1913

Member of the House of Representatives
- In office 8 November 1882 – 27 March 1888 Serving with Æneas Mackay Jr. (1882–1886), Levinus Wilhelmus Christiaan Keuchenius (1886–1888)
- Preceded by: Matthias Margarethus van Asch van Wijck
- Succeeded by: Æneas Mackay Jr.
- Constituency: Amersfoort (1882–1888)
- In office 1 May 1888 – 24 January 1916
- Succeeded by: Reinhardt Snoeck Henkemans
- Constituency: Apeldoorn (1888–1916)

Speaker of the House of Representatives
- In office 23 September 1909 – 15 September 1912
- Preceded by: Joan Röell
- Succeeded by: Octaaf van Nispen tot Sevenaer

Personal details
- Born: Willem Karel Frederik Pieter graaf van Bylandt; 4 December 1841 The Hague, Netherlands
- Died: 4 July 1924 (aged 82) Zeist, Netherlands
- Party: ARP (until 1894); Free Anti-Revolutionary Party (1897–1903); Christian Historical Party (1903–1908); CHU (1908–1924)
- Spouse(s): Marie Sophie van Westrenen (m. 1873; died 1882) Anna Louisa Agatha van Loon (m. 1892)
- Education: Leiden University

Willem Karel Frederik Pieter graaf van Bylandt (4 December 1841 – 4 July 1924) was a Dutch diplomat and politician. He was a member of the Dutch House of Representatives, initially as an anti-revolutionary MP and later as a member of the Christian Historical Union (CHU), from 1882 to 1912 representing Amersfoort electoral district until 1888, and Apeldoorn until 1912. From 1909 to 1912, he served as Speaker of the House of Representatives, but faced conflicts with the Social Democratic Workers' Party and the personal opposition of Queen Wilhelmina.

== Early life ==
Frederik van Bylandt was born on 4 December 1841 in The Hague to Ernst Ferdinand Hubert Marcus graaf van Bylandt, a doctor who had been the personal physician of Prince Frederick of the Netherlands, and Auguste Sieglinde Nasse. He was born into a noble family of German descent, both of his parents having been born in modern-day Germany. Frederik van Bylandt began studying law at Leiden University in 1858 and obtained his doctorate in 1863.

Van Bylandt began his diplomatic career as an attaché at the Dutch legation in Frankfurt, where he worked from 1864 to 1866. He subsequently worked as a diplomat in some of the most important cities of the time, including London, Paris, Vienna, and Berlin. In 1877, Van Bylandt returned to the Netherlands, where he worked at the Dutch Ministry of Foreign Affairs until 1879, when he became the leading Dutch diplomat in Stockholm, which he remained until 1883.

== Political career ==
Van Bylandt was first elected to the House of Representatives in a by-election in 1882 in the Amersfoort electoral district, which he would represent until 1888, when he was elected in the Apeldoorn district. As an MP, Van Bylandt spoke most often on colonial, military, and foreign affairs. He was first elected as a member of the Anti-Revolutionary Party (ARP), but left the ARP in 1894 to join the Free Anti-Revolutionary Party, later known as the Christian Historical Union (CHU), led by Alexander de Savornin Lohman, serving as the party's treasurer from 1898. In 1908, Van Bylandt was considered as a candidate to become Minister of Foreign Affairs, but was rejected in favor of René de Marees van Swinderen.

On 22 September 1909, Van Bylandt was elected as Speaker of the House of Representatives. The CHU had preferred Johannes Theodoor de Visser as their choice for speaker, but feared that De Visser's status as a Dutch Reformed minister would set a precedent allowing for a Catholic clergyman, such as General League leader Wiel Nolens, to eventually preside over the House of Representatives.

Contemporaries described Van Bylandt as a "very humane speaker", but noted that he had difficulty punishing unruly behavior. This led to frequent conflicts on the floor of the House of Representatives, most often involving MPs of the Social Democratic Workers' Party (SDAP), who were known for applying obstructionist tactics. Van Bylandt's reelection in 1911 led to Queen Wilhelmina, who personally disliked Van Bylandt but was unable to personally remove him in her role as constitutional monarch, boycotting the yearly troonrede and forcing Prime Minister Theo Heemskerk to read the Queen's speech instead. That same year, Van Bylandt was unable to call SDAP MP Jan Schaper to order after Schaper had begun screaming insults and had threatened to start throwing objects on the House floor. Van Bylandt then sat out the rest of the parliamentary session, being replaced by Octaaf van Nispen tot Sevenaer.

In 1912, Van Bylandt's tenure as Speaker ended, being succeeded by Van Nispen tot Sevenaer. Van Bylandt remained a member of the House of Representatives until 1916.

== Later life ==
Following his retirement from the House of Representatives, Van Bylandt became member of the executive board of the Zeeland steamboat company.

Frederik van Bylandt died on 4 July 1924 in Zeist.

== Personal life ==
Frederik van Bylandt was married twice. In 1873, he married Marie Sophie van Westrenen, lady of Driebergen, with whom he had four children. After her death in 1883, Van Bylandt remarried to Anna Louisa Agatha van Loon in 1892. He belonged to the Dutch Reformed Church.

Van Bylandt was made a Commander in the Order of the Netherlands Lion on 31 August 1911.
