= 1923 Dutch Senate election =

- 27 July 1923
- All 50 seats in the Senate; 26 seats needed for a majority
Party	Leader	Vote %	Seats	+/–
AB		32.40	16	−5
SDAP		19.76	11	+8
ARP		15.31	8	−6
CHU		12.52	7	0
LSP		10.50	5	+4
VDB		6.82	3	−1
This lists parties that won seats. See the complete results below.
President of the Senate before	President of the Senate after
Jan Joseph Godfried van Voorst tot Voorst; AB	Jan Joseph Godfried van Voorst tot Voorst; AB

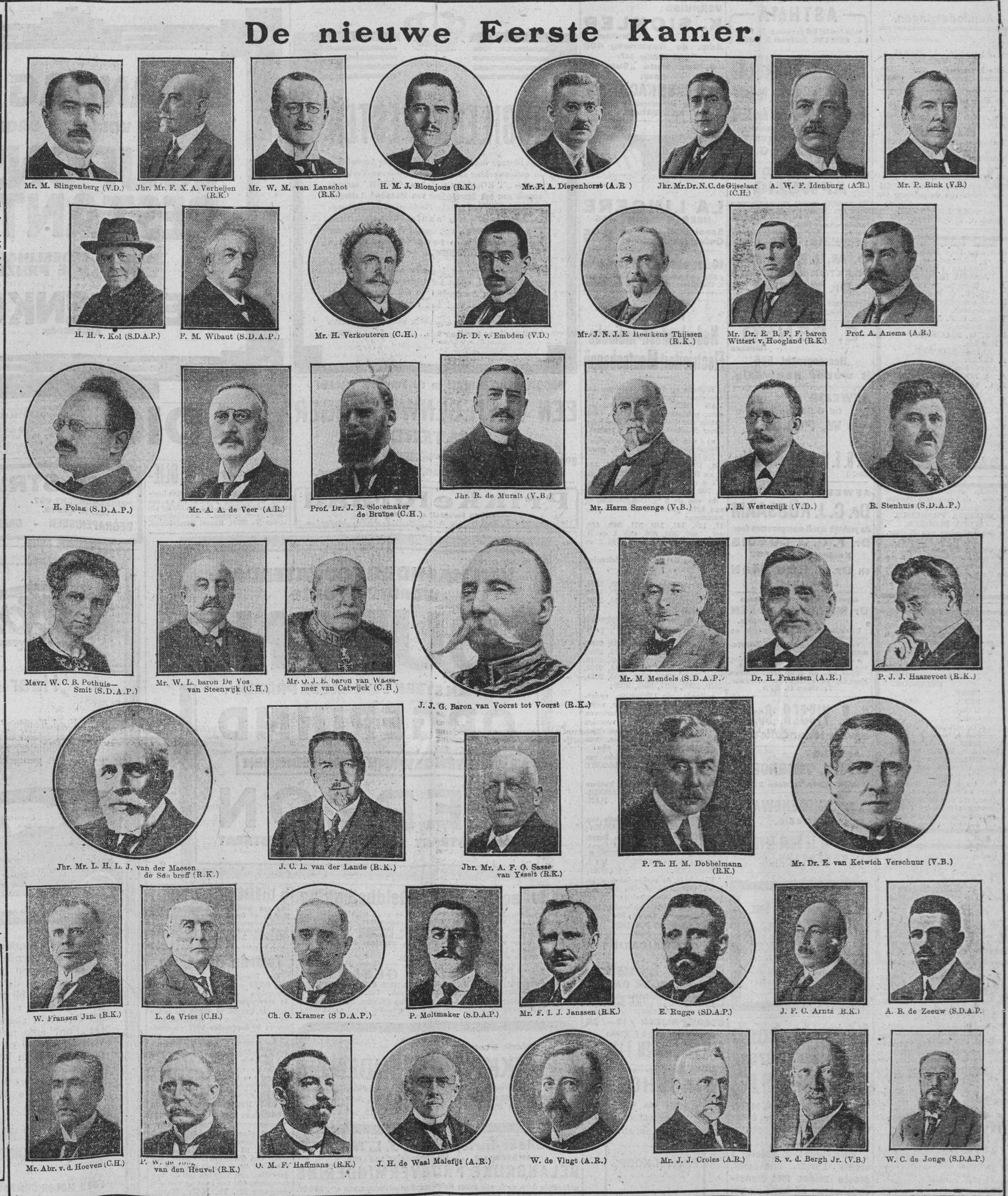
Elected Senators

Elections for all 50 seats of the Senate of the Netherlands took place on 27 July 1923.

It was the first election held after the 1922 constitutional revision, which introduced party-list proportional representation for Senate elections. Senators were elected by provincial councils in four "electoral groups". Group I comprised North Brabant, Zeeland, Utrecht and Limburg; group II comprised Gelderland, Overijssel, Groningen and Drenthe; group III comprised North Holland and Friesland; and group IV comprised South Holland. Provincial councillors' votes were weighted to their province's population.

The election resulted in a reduced majority of 31 seats for the Coalition government, comprising the Catholic General League, the Anti-Revolutionary Party and the Christian Historical Union. The Social Democratic Workers' Party became the largest opposition party in the Senate with 11 seats, 8 up from the previous election.

== Results ==
1923 Senate election
Party	Votes	Weight	%	Seats	+/–
General League	183	21,807	32.40	16	−5
Social Democratic Workers' Party	109	13,302	19.76	11	+8
Anti-Revolutionary Party	91	10,305	15.31	8	−6
Christian Historical Union	71	8,424	12.52	7	0
Liberal State Party	63	7,071	10.50	5	+4
Free-thinking Democratic League	37	4,589	6.82	3	−1
Peasants' League	11	1,100	1.63	0	New
Reformed Political Party	6	713	1.06	0	New
Total	571	67,311	100.00	50	0
Source: Staatscourant

=== By electoral group ===
1923 Senate election in electoral group I
Party	Votes	Weight	%	Seats	+/–
General League	108	11,247	63.74	8	−2
Social Democratic Workers' Party	21	1,820	10.32	2	+2
Anti-Revolutionary Party	20	1,539	8.72	1	−1
Christian Historical Union	16	1,321	7.49	1	0
Liberal State Party	15	1,119	6.34	1	+1
Free-thinking Democratic League	5	421	2.39	0	0
Reformed Political Party	3	177	1.00	0	New
Total	188	17,644	100.00	13	0
Source: Staatscourant

1923 Senate election in electoral group II
Party	Votes	Weight	%	Seats	+/–
General League	37	3,883	22.65	3	−1
Social Democratic Workers' Party	39	3,565	20.79	3	+2
Anti-Revolutionary Party	33	2,992	17.45	2	−2
Christian Historical Union	25	2,412	14.07	2	0
Liberal State Party	24	2,173	12.67	2	+1
Free-thinking Democratic League	15	1,358	7.92	1	−1
Peasants' League	8	644	3.76	0	New
Reformed Political Party	1	120	0.70	0	New
Total	182	17,147	100.00	13	0
Source: Staatscourant

1923 Senate election in electoral group III
Party	Votes	Weight	%	Seats	+/–
Social Democratic Workers' Party	31	4,173	24.34	3	+1
General League	23	3,557	20.74	3	0
Anti-Revolutionary Party	22	2,446	14.26	2	−2
Christian Historical Union	19	2,403	14.01	2	0
Liberal State Party	15	1,907	11.12	1	+1
Free-thinking Democratic League	12	1,770	10.32	1	−1
Peasants' League	2	248	1.45	0	New
Total	124	16,504	100.00	12	0
Source: Staatscourant

1923 Senate election in electoral group IV
Party	Votes	Weight	%	Seats	+/–
Social Democratic Workers' Party	18	3,744	23.38	3	+3
Anti-Revolutionary Party	16	3,328	20.78	3	−1
General League	15	3,120	19.48	2	−2
Christian Historical Union	11	2,288	14.29	2	0
Liberal State Party	9	1,872	11.69	1	+1
Free-thinking Democratic League	5	1,040	6.49	1	+1
Reformed Political Party	2	416	2.60	0	New
Peasants' League	1	208	1.30	0	New
Total	77	16,016	100.00	12	0
Source: Staatscourant
