= Electoral Council =

Election commission in the Netherlands

- Kiesraad
- Logo of the Electoral Council since August 2023

Agency overview
- Formed: 1917
- Type: Election commission
- Headquarters: The Hague
- Annual budget: 12,061,000 euros (2023)
- Agency executive: Wim Kuijken, chair
- Parent department: Ministry of the Interior and Kingdom Relations
- Website: english.kiesraad.nl

The Electoral Council (Dutch: Kiesraad), until 1951 known as the central electoral committee (Dutch: Centraal Stembureau), is an election commission in the Netherlands. The Council is responsible for determining the results and the allocation of seats for elections for the House of Representatives, Senate (since 1923) and the European Parliament. The Council also advices the government on suffrage and the elections. It was founded in 1917, when the elections for the House of Representatives switched to proportional representation.

== History ==
As part of the Pacification of 1917, proportional representation was introduced for the elections for the House of Representatives. The State Commission-Oppenheim was tasked with creating a proposal for the elections. This required a national election commission, to determine the election results, which had been done locally before in the electoral districts. On 12 December 1917, the central electoral committee was created, with members of the State Commission-Oppenheim as the first members. This included active politicians of different parties, to provide legitimacy to the determination of the election results.

The first election it certified was the 1918 general election. In the period 1922-1923, the committee designed a regulation introducing proportional representation for the Senate. The committee got the same responsibility of determining the results, which it first put in practice during the 1923 Senate election.

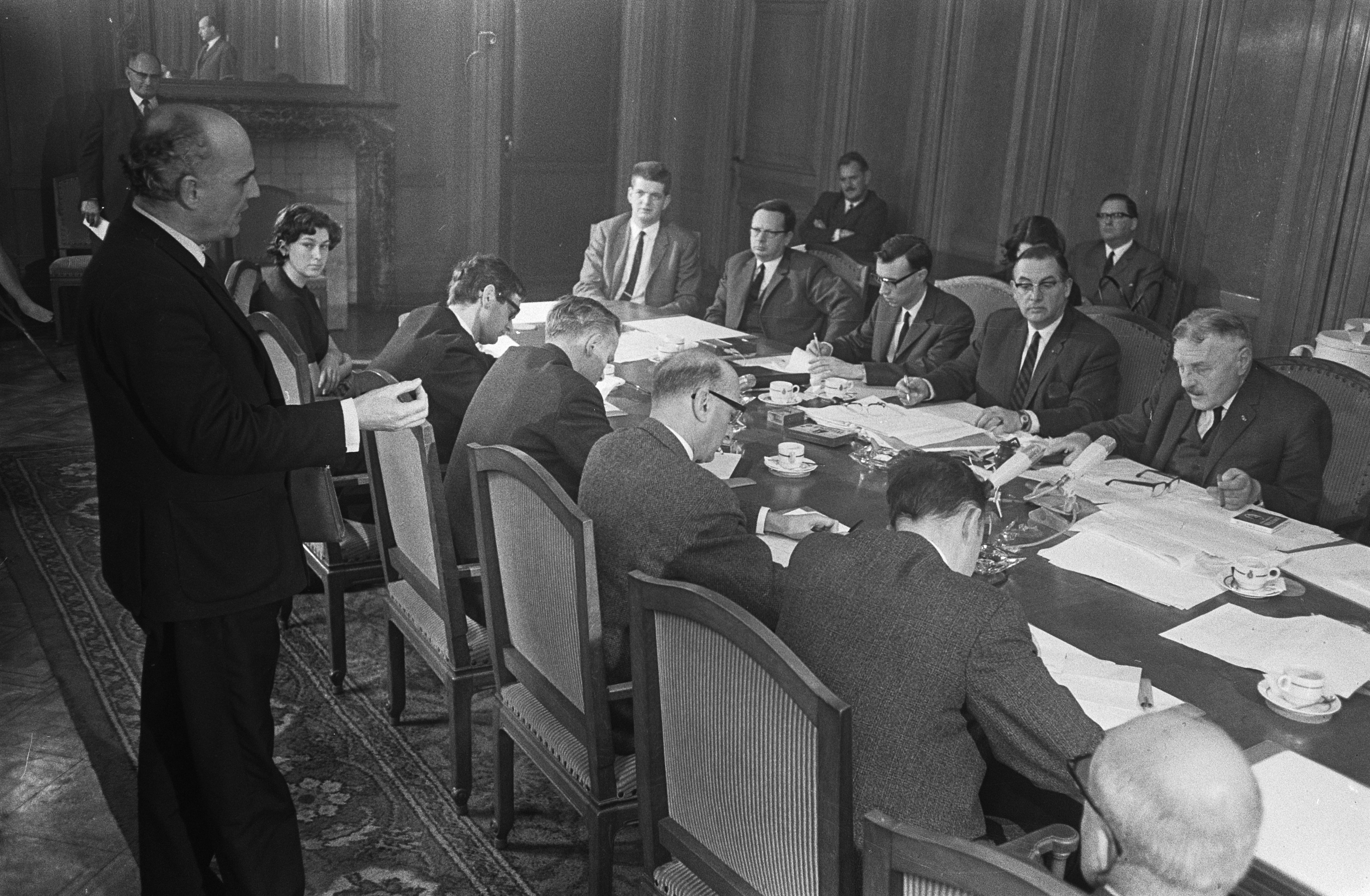
The Electoral Council listening to a complaint by Pierre Koot (left) after the 1967 general election.

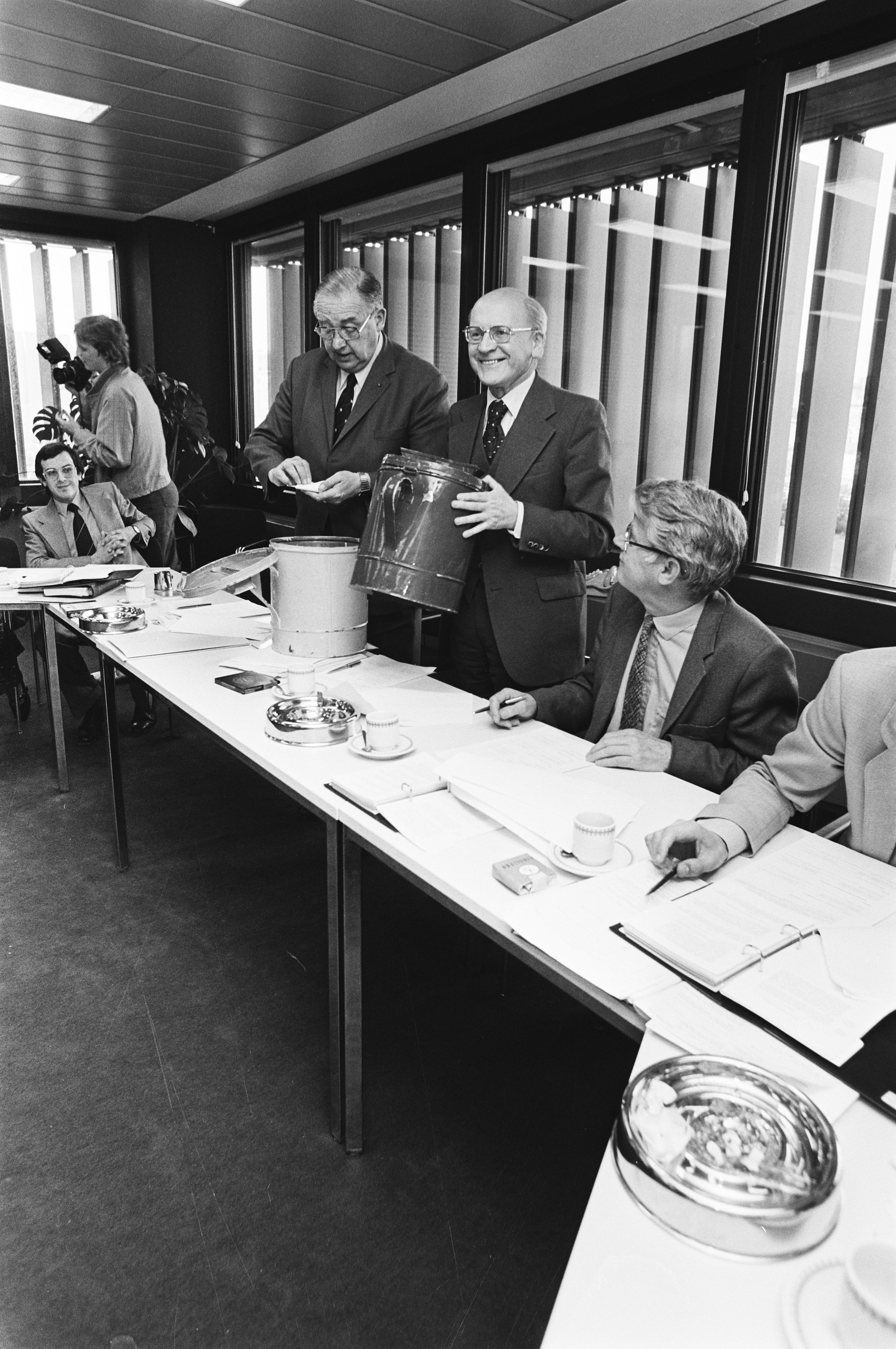
The Electoral Council numbering party lists randomly for the 1981 general election.

== Organisation ==
At the start, the Council comprised five members and three substitute members, although there was little difference in practice. It has changed to seven members. Members are appointed for four years. As maximum of two reappointments was introduced later.

The Council is supported by a secretariat and a scientific Advisory Board.

=== Chairs ===
- Jacques Oppenheim (1918–1922)
- Teun Struycken (1922–1923)
- Alex van Lynden van Sandenburg (1924–1928)
- Johan van Gelein Vitringa (1928–1938)
- Egbert Beumer (1938–1940)
- George van den Bergh (1946–1963)
- Leopold Nijpels (1963–1965)
- Jan Donner (1966–1976)
- Henk Beernink (1976–1979)
- H.J.M. Jeukens (1979–1980)
- Huub Franssen (1980–1989)
- J.H. Prins (1990–1996)
- Frank van Dooren (1996–2004)
- Henk Kummeling (2005–2017)
- Jan Kees Wiebenga (2017–2021)
- Wim Kuijken (2021–present)
