= Jan Harte van Tecklenburg =

Dutch politician

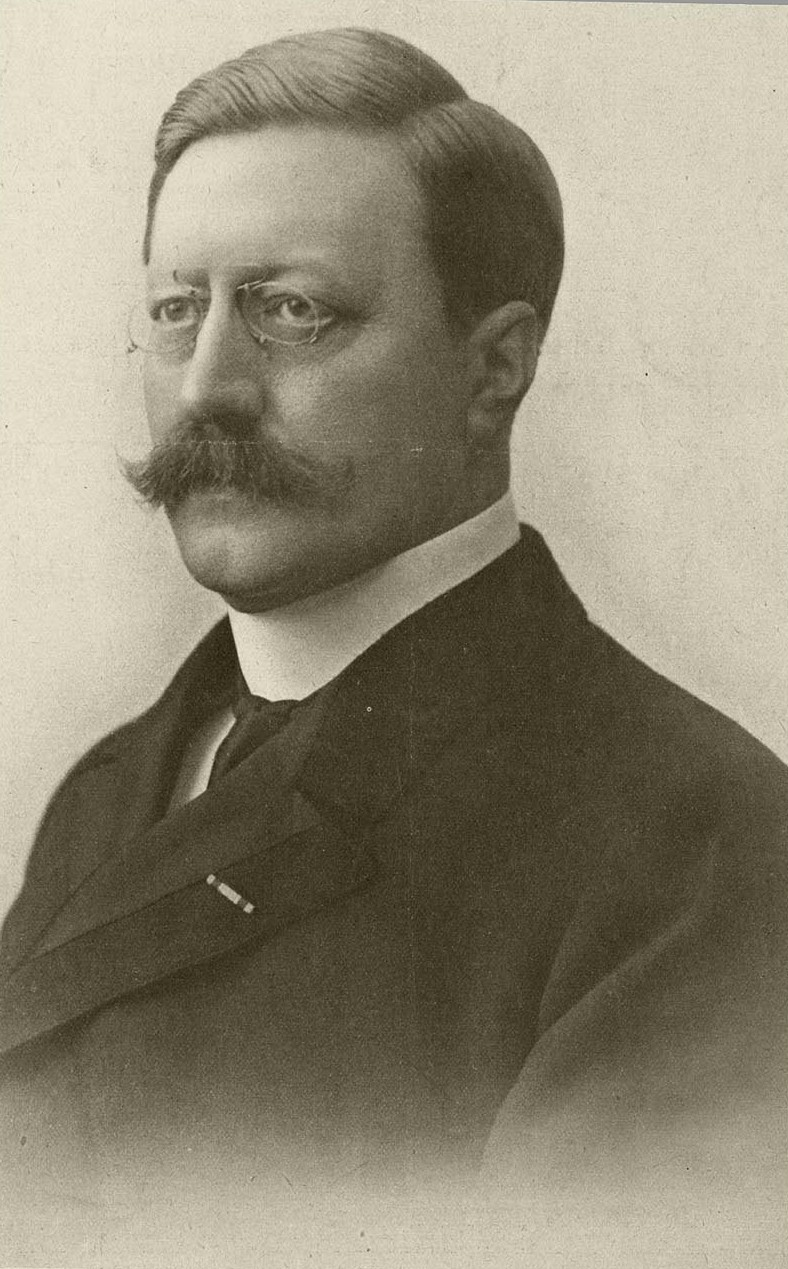
Joannes Josephus Ignatius Harte van Tecklenburg.

Jan Harte van Tecklenburg or Joannes Josephus Ignatius Harte (15 October 1853 – 4 July 1937) was a Dutch politician.

Van Tecklenburg was born in Utrecht. He was a staunch Roman Catholic and was initially a member of the conservative wing of the Catholic party. He acquired wealth by marrying the daughter of a wealthy margarine manufacturer, Anton Jurgens. With that help he was elected to the Dutch House of Representatives from the Grave district. In parliament he became a follower of Herman Schaepman who was concerned with reforms particularly in the area of social services. He served as his party's treasurer, and in 1901 he became the Minister of Finance in the ARP's Kuyper cabinet. However the only significant legislation that he proposed was a protectionist Tariff Act, and that came so late in his tenure, that it died when the government lost the election on 19 August 1905.

House of Representatives of the Netherlands
New district	Member for Grave; 1888–1901	Succeeded by Wilhelmus Friesen
