= 1894 Dutch general election =

- 10 April 1894 (first round); 24 April 1894 (second round)
- All 100 seats in the House of Representatives; 51 seats needed for a majority
- Turnout: 57.21% (▼14.43pp)
Party	Leader	Vote %	Seats	+/–
Lib	Hendrik Goeman Borgesius	31.60	31	−23
VL		27.99	29	New
Catholics	Leopold Haffmans	13.38	25	0
ARP	Abraham Kuyper	12.98	5	−15
Free ARs		6.82	7	New
RL	Willem Treub	5.23	2	+2
Radicals	Boelo Luitjen Tijdens	0.37	1	0
This lists parties that won seats. See the complete results below.
Results by constituency
Cabinet before	Cabinet after
Van Tienhoven cabinet Liberal	Röell cabinet Liberal

General elections were held in the Netherlands on 10 April 1894, with a second round in 27 constituencies on 24 April. The Liberal Union and the dissident Free Liberals remained the largest group, winning 60 of the 100 seats in the House of Representatives.

== Electoral system ==
Of the 100 seats in the House of Representatives, 79 were elected in single-member constituencies using the two-round system.

The other 21 were elected using two-round plurality block voting in 5 constituencies from 2 to 9 seats. To be elected in the first round, a candidate had to reach an electoral threshold of 50% of the number of valid votes cast, divided by the number of seats up for election in the district.

== Results ==
Party	First round			Second round			Total seats	+/–
Party	Votes	%	Seats	Votes	%	Seats	Total seats	+/–
Liberal Union	87,376	31.60	24	22,788	20.70	7	31	–23
Free Liberals	77,375	27.99	16	40,660	36.94	13	29	New
Catholics	36,991	13.38	21	12,347	11.22	4	25	0
Anti-Revolutionary Party	35,898	12.98	3	15,101	13.72	2	5	–15
Free Anti-Revolutionaries	18,850	6.82	3	6,936	6.30	4	7	New
Radical League	14,459	5.23	2	6,742	6.13	0	2	+2
Other parties	5,514	1.99	1	5,497	4.99	0	1	–
Total	276,463	100.00	70	110,071	100.00	30	100	0
Valid votes	168,293	98.26		78,949	98.26			
Invalid votes	316	0.18		162	0.20			
Blank votes	2,663	1.55		1,240	1.54			
Total votes	171,272	100.00		80,351	100.00			
Registered voters/turnout	299,391	57.21		110,341	72.82			
Source: Kiesraad, Huygens

Several candidates ran in multiple districts. When they won in more than one seat they picked which seat to take. As a result, several by-elections took place shortly after the general election, leading to the Liberal Union having 32 seats in total, the Free Liberals 25, the ARP 7 seats and the Free Anti-Revolutionaries 8.

=== By district ===
Radical Liberal National Anti-Revolutionary Catholic

District results for the Dutch general election, 1894
District	Incumbent	Winner	Ref.
Alkmaar	Willem van der Kaay (Note: Was appointed Minister of Justice in the Röell cabinet after the election. In a subsequent by-election, Adrianus Petrus de Lange (Liberal) was elected as his successor.)		
Almelo	Herman Schaepman		
Amersfoort	Jan Schimmelpenninck van der Oye	Francis David Schimmelpenninck	
Amsterdam	Willem Hendrik de Beaufort		
Amsterdam	Jacob Theodoor Cremer		
Amsterdam	Johan George Gleichman		
Amsterdam	Abraham Hartogh		
Amsterdam	Bernardus Hermanus Heldt		
Amsterdam	Arnold Kerdijk		
Amsterdam	Isaäc Abraham Levy	Menso Pijnappel	
Amsterdam	Jan Rutgers van Rozenburg		
Amsterdam	Willem Vrolik	Johannes Tak van Poortvliet	
Apeldoorn	Frederik van Bylandt		
Appingedam	Jan Schepel		
Arnhem	Pieter Rink		
Assen	Warmold Albertinus van der Feltz	Jan Jacob Willinge	
Bergen op Zoom	Lambert de Ram		
Bergum	Hubert Philippus de Kanter		
Beverwijk	Theodorus Borret		
Bodegraven	Simon van Velzen	Aart Knijff Hzn.	
Breda	Louis Michiels van Verduynen		
Breukelen	Willem Jan Roijaards van den Ham		
Brielle	Gerardus Jacobus Goekoop		
Delft	Henri Adolphe van de Velde	Gerard Beelaerts van Blokland	
Den Bosch	Pierre Guillaume Jean van der Schrieck		
Den Haag	Jan Conrad		
Den Haag	Henri Daniel Guyot		
Den Haag	Jacobus Pijnacker Hordijk		
Den Helder	Simon Taco Land		
Deventer	Albertus van Delden		
Doetinchem	Jean Bevers	Herman Hesselink van Suchtelen	
Dokkum	Ulrich Herman Huber	Eelco Schaafsma	
Dordrecht	Hugo van Gijn		
Druten	Jacobus Travaglino		
Ede	Constant van Löben Sels	Anton Willem van Borssele	
Eindhoven	Josephus Smits van Oyen		
Elst	Godert Willem van Dedem	Willem van Basten Batenburg	
Emmen	Petrus Hendrik Roessingh		
Enkhuizen	Jan Zijp		
Enschede	Willem Jacob Geertsema	Antonius Franciscus Vos de Wael	
Franeker	Franciscus Lieftinck		
Goes	Alexander de Savornin Lohman		
Gorinchem	Hendrik Seret		
Gouda	Theodore Valette	Carel van Bylandt	
Grave	Jan Harte van Tecklenburg		
Groningen	Samuel van Houten	Hendrik Lodewijk Drucker	
Groningen	Jacob Dirk Veegens		
Gulpen	Iwan de Marchant et d'Ansembourg		
Haarlem	Antonie Farncombe Sanders		
Haarlemmermeer	Frederic Reekers	Gerrit Blankers 't Hooft	
Harlingen	Theo Heemskerk	Abraham Bouman	
Helmond	Petrus Vermeulen		
Hilversum	Theodoor Philip Mackay		
Hontenisse	Felix Walter	Jan Gerard van Deinse	
Hoorn	Petrus Boele Jacobus Ferf		
Kampen	Aeneas Mackay Jr.		
Katwijk	Johannes Hendricus Donner		
Leeuwarden	Carel Victor Gerritsen		
Leiden	Hendrik Johannes Bool		
Lochem	Egbert Broer Kielstra	Cornelis Lely	
Loosduinen	Arnoldus van Berckel		
Maastricht	Martin de Ras		
Meppel	Harm Smeenge		
Middelburg	Christiaan Lucasse		
Nijmegen	Franciscus Dobbelmann		
Ommen	Jan van Alphen		
Oostburg	Pieter Hennequin		
Oosterhout	Isaäc van den Berch van Heemstede		
Rheden	Maximilien Kolkman		
Ridderkerk	Arie Smit		
Roermond	Willem Everts		
Rotterdam	George Hermann Hintzen		
Rotterdam	Abraham van Karnebeek	Jan van Gennep	
Rotterdam	Antoine Plate		
Rotterdam	Rudolf Pieter Mees		
Rotterdam	Willem Adriaan Viruly Verbrugge		
Schiedam	Allard van der Borch van Verwolde	Otto van Limburg Stirum	
Schoterland	Hendrik Pyttersen		
Sittard	Jerôme Lambrechts		
Sliedrecht	Barthold de Geer van Jutphaas	Abraham Kuyper	
Sneek	Willem Gerard Brantsen van de Zijp	Theo Heemskerk	
Steenwijk	Gerard Beelaerts van Blokland	Jan Meesters	
Tiel	Meinard Tydeman		
Tilburg	Bernardus Marie Bahlmann		
Utrecht	Hendrik Adriaan van Beuningen	Jacob Nicolaas Bastert	
Utrecht	Joan Röell (Note: Was appointed Chairman of the Council of Ministers and Minister of Foreign Affairs in the Röell cabinet after the election. In a subsequent by-election, Abraham van Karnebeek (Liberal) was elected as his successor.)		
Veendam	Eerke Albert Smidt		
Veghel	Bernardus van Vlijmen		
Venlo	Leopold Haffmans		
Waalwijk	Willem Mutsaers		
Weert	Jean Clercx	Jan Truijen	
Wijk bij Duurstede	Willem Hendrik de Beaufort		
Winschoten	Boelo Luitjen Tijdens		
Wolvega	Wesselius Marcus Houwing		
Zaandam	Willem de Meijier	Klaas de Boer Czn.	
Zevenbergen	Emile van der Kun		
Zierikzee	Jacob Johan van Kerkwijk		
Zuidhorn	Geuchien Zijlma		
Zutphen	Hendrik Goeman Borgesius		
Zwolle	Alexander van Dedem		
