= Electoral districts of the Netherlands =

The 20 electoral districts for general elections, as of 2022

The Netherlands has had electoral districts since 1814. From 1814, the districts matched the provinces and the members of the House of Representatives were elected indirectly via the provincial councils.

After the Constitutional Reform of 1848, members of the House of Representatives were elected directly in a two-round system. 38 electoral districts (Dutch: kiesdistrict) were created, with sometimes multiple members per district who were elected in staggered elections. The number of districts increased over time, with 100 in 1896 when multi-member districts were abolished.

After the Pacification of 1917, party-list proportional representation was introduced in Dutch elections. There are still electoral districts (Dutch: kieskring). Electoral lists are filed per district, which means the list can differ per district and lists might not participate in all districts.

== Proportional representation (1918–present) ==
Electoral districts differ between elections in the Netherlands. For the European Parliament elections, the Netherlands is a single district.

=== House of Representatives ===
Electoral districts for general elections since 1918
| Number | | Seat | Includes |
| Since 1989 | Until 1989 | Seat | Includes |
|---|---|---|---|
| 1 | XVI | Groningen | Province of Groningen |
| 2 | XIV | Leeuwarden | Province of Friesland |
| 3 | XVII | Assen | Province of Drenthe |
| 4 | XV | Zwolle | Province of Overijssel |
| 5 | XIX | Lelystad | Province of Flevoland |
| 6 | IV | Nijmegen | Southern Gelderland: municipalities of Berg en Dal, Beuningen, Buren, Culemborg, Druten, Heumen, Maasdriel, Neder-Betuwe, Nijmegen, Tiel, West Betuwe, West Maas en Waal, Wijchen, and Zaltbommel |
| 7 | III | Arnhem | Northern Gelderland: municipalities of Aalten, Apeldoorn, Arnhem, Barneveld, Berkelland, Bronckhorst, Brummen, Doesburg, Doetinchem, Duiven, Ede, Elburg, Epe, Ermelo, Harderwijk, Hattem, Heerde, Lingewaard, Lochem, Montferland, Nijkerk, Nunspeet, Oldebroek, Oost Gelre, Oude IJsselstreek, Overbetuwe, Putten, Renkum, Rheden, Rozendaal, Scherpenzeel, Voorst, Wageningen, Westervoort, Winterswijk, Zevenaar, and Zutphen |
| 8 | XIII | Utrecht | Province of Utrecht |
| 9 | IX | Amsterdam | Municipality of Amsterdam |
| 10 | XI | Haarlem | Southern North Holland: municipalities of Aalsmeer, Amstelveen, Beverwijk, Blaricum, Bloemendaal, Diemen, Gooise Meren, Haarlem, Haarlemmermeer, Heemskerk, Heemstede, Hilversum, Huizen, Laren, Ouder-Amstel, Uithoorn, Velsen, Wijdemeren, and Zandvoort |
| 11 | X | Den Helder | Northern North Holland: municipalities of Alkmaar, Castricum, Bergen, Den Helder, Dijk en Waard, Drechterland, Edam-Volendam, Enkhuizen, Heiloo, Hollands Kroon, Hoorn, Koggenland, Landsmeer, Medemblik, Oostzaan, Opmeer, Purmerend, Schagen, Stede Broec, Texel, Uitgeest, Waterland, Wormerland, and Zaanstad |
| 12 | VI | The Hague | Municipality of The Hague, and postal voters abroad |
| 13 | V | Rotterdam | Municipality of Rotterdam |
| 14 | VIII | Dordrecht | Southern South Holland: municipalities of Alblasserdam, Albrandswaard, Barendrecht, Delft, Dordrecht, Goeree-Overflakkee, Gorinchem, Hardinxveld-Giessendam, Hendrik-Ido-Ambacht, Hoeksche Waard, Maassluis, Midden-Delfland, Molenlanden, Nissewaard, Papendrecht, Ridderkerk, Rijswijk, Schiedam, Sliedrecht, Vlaardingen, Voorne aan Zee, Westland, and Zwijndrecht |
| 15 | VII | Leiden | Northern South Holland: municipalities of Alphen aan den Rijn, Bodegraven-Reeuwijk, Capelle aan den IJssel, Gouda, Hillegom, Kaag en Braassem, Katwijk, Krimpen aan den IJssel, Krimpenerwaard, Lansingerland, Leiden, Leiderdorp, Leidschendam-Voorburg, Lisse, Nieuwkoop, Noordwijk, Oegstgeest, Pijnacker-Nootdorp, Teylingen, Voorschoten, Waddinxveen, Wassenaar, Zoetermeer, Zoeterwoude, and Zuidplas |
| 16 | XII | Middelburg | Province of Zeeland |
| 17 | II | Tilburg | Western North Brabant: municipalities of Alphen-Chaam, Altena, Baarle-Nassau, Bergen op Zoom, Breda, Dongen, Drimmelen, Etten-Leur, Geertruidenberg, Gilze en Rijen, Goirle, Halderberge, Hilvarenbeek, Loon op Zand, Moerdijk, Oisterwijk, Oosterhout, Roosendaal, Rucphen, Steenbergen, Tilburg, Waalwijk, Woensdrecht, and Zundert |
| 18 | I | 's-Hertogenbosch | Eastern North Brabant: municipalities of Asten, Bergeijk, Bernheze, Best, Bladel, Boekel, Boxtel, Cranendonck, Deurne, Eersel, Eindhoven, Geldrop-Mierlo, Gemert-Bakel, Heeze-Leende, Helmond, 's-Hertogenbosch, Heusden, Laarbeek, Land van Cuijk, Maashorst, Meierijstad, Moerdijk, Nuenen, Oirschot, Oss, Reusel-De Mierden, Sint-Michielsgestel, Someren, Son en Breugel, Valkenswaard, Veldhoven, Vught, and Waalre |
| 19 | XVIII | Maastricht | Province of Limburg |
| 20 (Note: Since 2010) | — | Bonaire | Special municipalities of Bonaire, Saba, and Sint Eustatius |

== See also ==
- Electoral colleges for the Senate
