= Heemskerk–Van Lynden van Sandenburg cabinet =

Cabinet of the Netherlands, 1873 to 1877

- Cabinet of the Netherlands
- Date formed: 27 August 1873
- Date dissolved: 3 November 1877 (Demissionary from 27 August 1877)

People and organisations
- Head of state: King William III
- Head of government: Jan Heemskerk
- Deputy head of government: Theo van Lynden van Sandenburg
- No. of ministers: 7
- Ministers removed: 4
- Total no. of members: 11
- Member party: Independent Conservatives (Ind. Con.); Independent Liberals (Ind. Lib.)
- Status in legislature: Right-wing Majority government

History
- Election: 1873 election
- Outgoing election: 1877 election
- Legislature terms: 1873–1877
- Predecessor: De Vries–Fransen van de Putte cabinet
- Successor: Kappeyne van de Coppello cabinet

The Heemskerk–Van Lynden van Sandenburg cabinet was the cabinet of the Netherlands from 27 August 1873 until 3 November 1877. The cabinet was formed by Independent Conservatives (Ind. Con.) and Independent Liberals (Ind. Lib.) after the election of 1873. The right-wing cabinet was a majority government in the House of Representatives. Independent Liberal Conservative Jan Heemskerk was Prime Minister.

== Cabinet members ==
Cabinet members
| Ministers | | Title/Ministry | | Term of office | | Party |
| Ministers | | Title/Ministry | | Begin | End | Party |
|---|---|---|---|---|---|---|
| Jan Heemskerk | Dr. Jan Heemskerk (1818–1897) | Prime Minister | | 27 August 1873 | 3 November 1877 | Independent; Conservative (Liberal Conservative) |
| Jan Heemskerk | Dr. Jan Heemskerk (1818–1897) | Minister | Interior | 27 August 1873 | 3 November 1877 | Independent; Conservative (Liberal Conservative) |
| Joseph van der Does de Willebois | Jonkheer; Joseph van der Does de Willebois (1816–1892) | Minister | Foreign Affairs | 27 August 1873 | 3 November 1877 | Independent; Christian Democrat (Conservative Catholic) |
| | Jonkheer; Hendrik van der Heim (1824–1890) | Minister | Finance | 27 August 1873 | 3 November 1877 | Independent; Conservative (Liberal Conservative) |
| Theo van Lynden van Sandenburg | Count; Theo van Lynden van Sandenburg (1826–1885) | Minister | Justice | 27 August 1873 | 3 November 1877 | Independent; Christian Democrat (Protestant) |
| August Willem Philip Weitzel | Major general August Willem; Philip Weitzel (1816–1896) | Minister | War | 6 October 1873 | 29 April 1875^{[Retained]} ^{[Res]} | Independent; Liberal (Conservative Liberal) |
| | Colonel; Hendrik Enderlein (1821–1898) | Minister | War | 29 April 1875 | 1 January 1876^{[Res]} | Independent; Conservative (Liberal Conservative) |
| | Willem van Erp Taalman Kip (1824–1905) | Minister | War | 1 January 1876 | 1 February 1876^{[Ad interim]} | Independent; Liberal (Conservative Liberal) |
| | Jonkheer; Guillaume Klerck (1825–1884) | Minister | War | 1 February 1876 | 11 September 1876^{[Res]} | Independent; Liberal (Conservative Liberal) |
| | Willem van Erp Taalman Kip (1824–1905) | Minister | War | 11 September 1876 | 30 September 1876^{[Ad interim]} | Independent; Liberal (Conservative Liberal) |
| | Colonel; Hendrik Beijen (1817–1892) | Minister | War | 30 September 1876 | 3 November 1877 | Independent; Conservative (Liberal Conservative) |
| | Willem van Erp Taalman Kip (1824–1905) | Minister | Navy | 16 May 1874 | 3 November 1877^{[Retained]} | Independent; Liberal (Conservative Liberal) |
| Willem van Goltstein van Oldenaller | Baron; Willem van Goltstein van Oldenaller (1831–1901) | Minister | Colonial Affairs | 27 August 1873 | 11 September 1876^{[Res]} | Independent; Conservative (Liberal Conservative) |
| | Fokko Alting Mees (1819–1900) | Minister | Colonial Affairs | 11 September 1876 | 3 November 1877 | Independent; Liberal (Conservative Liberal) |

^{Retained} Retained this position from the previous cabinet.
^{Res} Resigned.
^{Ad interim} Served ad interim.
