= Theo van Lynden van Sandenburg =

Dutch politician (1826–1885)

His Excellency Theo, Count van Lynden van Sandenburg
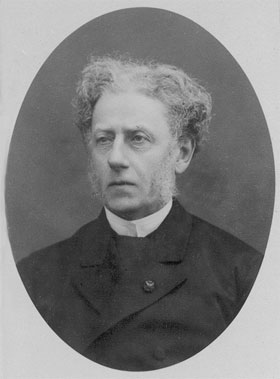
- Van Lynden van Sandenburg, 1882

Chairman of the Council of Ministers
- In office 20 August 1879 – 23 April 1883
- Monarch: William III
- Preceded by: Jan Kappeyne van de Coppello
- Succeeded by: Jan Heemskerk

Personal details
- Born: Constantijn Theodoor van Lynden van Sandenburg; 24 February 1826 Utrecht, Netherlands
- Died: 18 November 1885 (aged 59) Langbroek, Netherlands
- Spouse(s): Elisabeth van Persijn († 1866); Wilhelmina van Boetzelaer
- Children: Alex van Lynden van Sandenburg
- Education: Utrecht University
- Occupation: Lawyer

Constantijn Theodoor, Count van Lynden van Sandenburg, (24 February 1826 – 18 November 1885) was a Dutch politician who served as Chairman of the Council of Ministers (prime minister) of the Netherlands between 1879 and 1883.

== Early life ==
Lynden van Sandenburg was born in Utrecht on 24 February 1826. He registered to study Law at Utrecht University on 29 March 1844, and obtained a doctorate on 10 October 1848 with a dissertation entitled An matrimonio Ducis de Montpensier pax Rheno-Trajectina violata dici possit.

== Career ==
He trained as a lawyer before entering politics. He served on the Provincial Council of Utrecht for the district of Amerongen from 1860, and was elected to the House of Representatives in the district of Arnhem in 1866. In the House, he sided with the antirevolutionaries and Christian historicals, and concerned himself with various topics, including justice, agriculture, colonial affairs and education. Van Lynden van Sandenburg resigned his seats in January 1868, when he was appointed Minister of Reformed and Other Worship in the Van Zuylen van Nijevelt cabinet. He returned to the House representing the district of Tiel the following year. He went on to take the position of Minister of Justice between 1874 and 1877 in the Heemskerk–Van Lynden van Sandenburg cabinet. In this capacity, he reorganised the judiciary, limiting the number of courts.

Van Lynden van Sandenburg took office as Minister of Foreign Affairs and Chairman of the Council of Ministers in the Van Lynden van Sandenburg cabinet on 20 August 1879. Following Simon Vissering's resignation on 13 June 1881, Van Lynden van Sandenburg was appointed Minister of Finance, and he resigned as Minister of Foreign Affairs on 15 September of that year. In 1882, he proposed several tax reforms, but his bills were never adopted.

After the cabinet's resignation on 23 April 1883, Van Lynden van Sandenburg was granted the honorary title Minister of State, and was elected to the Senate representing the province of Utrecht. He served in the Senate until 8 November 1885, and died five days later in Sandenburg Castle in Langbroek.

== Private life ==
As a member of the ancient Dutch noble Lynden family, Lynden van Sandenburg was born a baron, but was elevated to count in 1882, with the right of succession to this title for all his legitimate, male-line descendants. He died in Langbroek in 1885.

== Literature ==
- 'Van Lynden', Nederlands Adelsboek 87 (1998), 547–649, there 567.
- Blok, P.J.; Molhuysen, P.C. (1918). "Lynden van Sandenburg, Constant Theodore". Nieuw Nederlandsch Biografisch Woordenboek. 4: 937–938.

House of Representatives of the Netherlands
Preceded by Willem van Lynden	Member for Arnhem; 1866–1868; With: Levinus Keuchenius	Succeeded by Willem Hendrik Dullert; Ludolph Sloet van de Beele
New seat	Member for Tiel; 1869–1871; With: Johannes Hasselman	Succeeded by Donald Mackay
Preceded by Johannes Hasselman	Member for Tiel; 1871–1874; With: Donald Mackay	Succeeded by Hendrik Anthon van Rappard
Political offices
Preceded by Gerrit de Vries	Minister of Justice; 1874–1877	Succeeded by Hendrik Jan Smidt
Preceded by Jan Kappeyne van de Coppello	Chairman of the Council of Ministers; 1879–1883	Succeeded by Jan Heemskerk
Preceded by Willem van Heeckeren van Kell	Minister of Foreign Affairs; 1879–1881	Succeeded by Willem Frederik Rochussen
Preceded by Simon Vissering	Minister of Finance; 1881–1883	Succeeded by Willem Johan Lucas Grobbée
