= Van Lynden van Sandenburg cabinet =

Cabinet of the Netherlands, 1879 to 1883

- Cabinet of the Netherlands
- Date formed: 20 August 1879
- Date dissolved: 23 April 1883 (Demissionary from 1 March 1883)

People and organisations
- Head of state: King William III
- Head of government: Theo van Lynden van Sandenburg
- No. of ministers: 8
- Ministers removed: 4
- Total no. of members: 11
- Member party: Independent Conservatives (Ind. Con.); Independent Liberals (Ind. Lib.); Independent Catholics (Ind. Cat.); Independent Protestants (Ind. Prot.)
- Status in legislature: Centre-right Majority government

History
- Election: 1879 election
- Outgoing election: 1883 election
- Legislature terms: 1879–1883
- Predecessor: Kappeyne van de Coppello cabinet
- Successor: J. Heemskerk cabinet

The Van Lynden van Sandenburg cabinet was the cabinet of the Netherlands from 20 August 1879 until 23 April 1883. The cabinet was formed by Independent Conservatives (Ind. Con.), Independent Liberals (Ind. Lib.), Independent Catholics (Ind. Cat.) and Independent Protestants (Ind. Prot.) after the election of 1879. The centre-right cabinet was a majority government in the House of Representatives. Independent Protestant Christian Democrat Theo van Lynden van Sandenburg was Prime Minister.

== Cabinet members ==
Cabinet members
Ministers		Title/Ministry		Term of office	Party
Theo van Lynden van Sandenburg	Count; Theo van Lynden van Sandenburg (1818–1897)	Prime Minister		20 August 1879 – 23 April 1883	Independent; Christian Democrat (Protestant)
Theo van Lynden van Sandenburg	Count; Theo van Lynden van Sandenburg (1818–1897)	Minister	Foreign Affairs	20 August 1879 – 15 September 1881^{[Appt]}	Independent; Christian Democrat (Protestant)
Willem Frederik Rochussen	Jonkheer; Willem Frederik Rochussen (1832–1912)	Minister	Foreign Affairs	15 September 1881 – 23 April 1883	Independent; Conservative (Liberal Conservative)
Willem Six	Jonkheer; Willem Six (1829–1908)	Minister	Interior	20 August 1879 – 10 February 1882^{[Res]}	Independent; Liberal (Conservative Liberal)
Cornelis Pijnacker Hordijk	Cornelis Pijnacker Hordijk (1847–1908)	Minister	Interior	10 February 1882 – 23 April 1883	Independent; Liberal (Conservative Liberal)
Simon Vissering	Dr. Simon Vissering (1818–1888)	Minister	Finance	20 August 1879 – 13 June 1881^{[Res]}	Independent; Liberal (Conservative Liberal)
Theo van Lynden van Sandenburg	Count; Theo van Lynden van Sandenburg (1826–1885)	Minister	Finance	13 June 1881 – 23 April 1883	Independent; Christian Democrat (Protestant)
Anthony Modderman	Dr. Anthony Modderman (1838–1885)	Minister	Justice	20 August 1879 – 23 April 1883	Independent; Liberal (Classical Liberal)
	Jonkheer; Guillaume Klerck (1825–1884)	Minister	Water Management, Commerce and Industry	20 August 1879 – 23 April 1883	Independent; Liberal (Conservative Liberal)
	Major general Anthonie Reuther (1819–1889)	Minister	War	20 August 1879 – 23 April 1883	Independent; Christian Democrat (Conservative Catholic)
	Willem van Erp Taalman Kip (1824–1905)	Minister	Navy	20 August 1879 – 23 April 1883	Independent; Liberal (Conservative Liberal)
Willem van Goltstein van Oldenaller	Baron; Willem van Goltstein van Oldenaller (1831–1901)	Minister	Colonial Affairs	20 August 1879 – 1 September 1882^{[Res]}	Independent; Conservative (Liberal Conservative)
	Jonkheer; Willem Maurits de Brauw (1838–1898)	Minister	Colonial Affairs	1 September 1882 – 23 February 1883^{[Res]}	Independent; Liberal (Conservative Liberal)
	Willem van Erp Taalman Kip (1824–1905)	Minister	Colonial Affairs	23 February 1883 – 23 April 1883^{[Ad interim]}	Independent; Liberal (Conservative Liberal)

^{Res} Resigned.
^{Ad interim} Served ad interim.
^{Appt} Appointment: Theo van Lynden van Sandenburg appointed Minister of Finance.
