= Jan Heemskerk cabinet =

Cabinet of the Netherlands, 1883 to 1888

- Cabinet of the Netherlands
- Date formed: 23 April 1883
- Date dissolved: 21 April 1888 (Demissionary from 30 March 188)

People and organisations
- Head of state: King William III
- Head of government: Jan Heemskerk
- No. of ministers: 8
- Ministers removed: 7
- Total no. of members: 15
- Member party: Independent Conservatives (Ind. Con.); Independent Liberals (Ind. Lib.); Independent Catholics (Ind. Cat.)
- Status in legislature: Right-wing Majority government

History
- Election: 1883 election
- Outgoing election: 1888 election
- Legislature terms: 1883–1888
- Predecessor: Van Lynden van Sandenburg cabinet
- Successor: Mackay cabinet

The Jan Heemskerk cabinet was the cabinet of the Netherlands from 23 April 1883 until 21 April 1888. The cabinet was formed by Independent Conservatives (Ind. Con.), Independent Liberals (Ind. Lib.) and Independent Catholics (Ind. Cat.) after the election of 1883. The right-wing cabinet was a majority government in the House of Representatives. Independent Liberal Conservative Jan Heemskerk was chair of the Council of ministers.

== Cabinet members ==
Cabinet members
| Ministers | | Title/ministry | | Term of office | Party |
|---|---|---|---|---|---|
| Jan Heemskerk | Dr. Jan Heemskerk (1818–1897) | Prime Minister | | 23 April 1883 – 21 April 1888 | Independent; Conservative (Liberal Conservative) |
| Jan Heemskerk | Dr. Jan Heemskerk (1818–1897) | Minister | Interior | 23 April 1883 – 21 April 1888 | Independent; Conservative (Liberal Conservative) |
| Joseph van der Does de Willebois | Jonkheer; Joseph van der Does de Willebois (1816–1892) | Minister | Foreign Affairs | 23 April 1883 – 10 August 1885^{[Note]} | Independent; Christian Democrat (Conservative Catholic) |
| Marc Willem du Tour van Bellinchave | Baron; Marc Willem du Tour van Bellinchave (1835–1908) | Minister | Foreign Affairs | 10 August 1885 – 14 September 1885^{[Ad interim]} | Independent; Conservative (Liberal Conservative) |
| Joseph van der Does de Willebois | Jonkheer; Joseph van der Does de Willebois (1816–1892) | Minister | Foreign Affairs | 14 September 1885 – 1 November 1885^{[Res]} | Independent; Christian Democrat (Conservative Catholic) |
| Abraham van Karnebeek | Jonkheer; Abraham van Karnebeek (1836–1925) | Minister | Foreign Affairs | 1 November 1885 – 21 April 1888 | Independent; Liberal (Conservative Liberal) |
| | Willem Grobbée (1822–1907) | Minister | Finance | 23 April 1883 – 4 May 1885^{[Res]} | Independent; Conservative (Liberal Conservative) |
| Jacobus Bloem | Jacobus Bloem (1822–1902) | Minister | Finance | 4 May 1885 – 21 April 1888 | Independent; Conservative (Liberal Conservative) |
| Marc Willem du Tour van Bellinchave | Baron; Marc Willem du Tour van Bellinchave (1835–1908) | Minister | Justice | 23 April 1883 – 21 April 1888 | Independent; Conservative (Liberal Conservative) |
| | Johannes van den Bergh (1824–1890) | Minister | Water Management, Commerce and Industry | 23 April 1883 – 10 June 1887^{[Res]} | Independent; Christian Democrat (Conservative Catholic) |
| Frederik Cornelis Tromp | Frederik Cornelis Tromp (1828–1900) | Minister | Water Management, Commerce and Industry | 10 June 1887 – 11 July 1887^{[Ad interim]} | Independent; Liberal (Conservative Liberal) |
| | Jacob Bastert (1826–1902) | Minister | Water Management, Commerce and Industry | 11 July 1887 – 21 April 1888 | Independent; Liberal (Conservative Liberal) |
| August Willem Philip Weitzel | Major general August Willem; Philip Weitzel (1816–1896) | Minister | War | 23 April 1883 – 21 April 1888 | Independent; Liberal (Conservative Liberal) |
| Frederik Geerling | Vice admiral Frederik Geerling (1815–1894) | Minister | Navy | 23 April 1883 – 19 April 1884^{[Res]} | Independent; Conservative (Liberal Conservative) |
| | Willem van Erp Taalman Kip (1824–1905) | Minister | Navy | 19 April 1884 – 5 August 1885^{[Res]} | Independent; Liberal (Conservative Liberal) |
| | Rear admiral Willem Gericke (1836–1914) | Minister | Navy | 5 August 1885 – 26 January 1887^{[Res]} | Independent; Conservative (Liberal Conservative) |
| Frederik Cornelis Tromp | Frederik Cornelis Tromp (1828–1900) | Minister | Navy | 26 January 1887 – 21 April 1888 | Independent; Liberal (Conservative Liberal) |
| | Gerard van Bloemen Waanders (1825–1892) | Minister | Colonial Affairs | 23 April 1883 – 25 November 1883^{[Res]} | Independent; Conservative (Liberal Conservative) |
| August Willem Philip Weitzel | Major general August Willem; Philip Weitzel (1816–1896) | Minister | Colonial Affairs | 25 November 1883 – 27 February 1884^{[Ad interim]} | Independent; Liberal (Conservative Liberal) |
| Jacobus Sprenger van Eyk | Jacobus Sprenger van Eyk (1842–1907) | Minister | Colonial Affairs | 27 February 1884 – 21 April 1888 | Independent; Liberal (Conservative Liberal) |

^{Res} Resigned.
^{Ad interim} Served ad interim.
