= Kappeyne van de Coppello cabinet =

Cabinet of the Netherlands, 1877 to 1879

- Cabinet of the Netherlands
- Date formed: 3 November 1877
- Date dissolved: 20 August 1879 (Demissionary from 11 July 1879)

People and organisations
- Head of state: King William III
- Head of government: Jan Kappeyne van de Coppello
- No. of ministers: 8
- Ministers removed: 2
- Total no. of members: 10
- Member party: Independent Liberals (Ind. Lib.)
- Status in legislature: Centre-right Minority government

History
- Election: 1877 election
- Outgoing election: 1879 election
- Legislature terms: 1877–1879
- Predecessor: Heemskerk–Van Lynden van Sandenburg cabinet
- Successor: Van Lynden van Sandenburg cabinet

The Kappeyne van de Coppello cabinet was the cabinet of the Netherlands from 3 November 1877 until 20 August 1879. The cabinet was formed by Independent Liberals after the election of 1877. The centre-right cabinet was a minority government in the House of Representatives. Independent Classical Liberal Jan Kappeyne van de Coppello was Prime Minister.

== Cabinet Members ==
Cabinet members
Ministers		Title/Ministry		Begin	End	Party
Jan Kappeyne van de Coppello	Jan Kappeyne van de Coppello	Prime Minister		3 November 1877	20 August 1879	Independent; Liberal (Classical Liberal)
Jan Kappeyne van de Coppello	Jan Kappeyne van de Coppello	Minister	Interior	3 November 1877	20 August 1879	Independent; Liberal (Classical Liberal)
Willem van Heeckeren van Kell	Willem van Heeckeren van Kell	Minister	Foreign Affairs	3 November 1877	20 August 1879	Independent; Liberal (Classical Liberal)
Johan Gleichman	Johan Gleichman	Minister	Finance	3 November 1877	20 August 1879	Independent; Liberal (Conservative Liberal)
Hendrik Jan Smidt	Hendrik Jan Smidt	Minister	Justice	3 November 1877	20 August 1879	Independent; Liberal (Conservative Liberal)
Johannes Tak van Poortvliet	Johannes Tak van Poortvliet	Minister	Water Management, Commerce and Industry	3 November 1877	20 August 1879	Independent; Liberal (Classical Liberal)
	Jan Karel de Roo van Alderwerelt	Minister	War	3 November 1877	29 December 1878^{[Died]}	Independent; Liberal (Classical Liberal)
	Hendrikus Wichers	Minister	War	29 December 1878	15 February 1879^{[Ad interim]}	Independent; Liberal (Classical Liberal)
Jacobus den Beer Poortugael	Jacobus den Beer Poortugael	Minister	War	15 February 1879	20 August 1879	Independent; Liberal (Classical Liberal)
	Hendrikus Wichers	Minister	Navy	3 November 1877	20 August 1879	Independent; Liberal (Classical Liberal)
Pieter Philip van Bosse	Pieter Philip van Bosse	Minister	Colonial Affairs	3 November 1877	21 February 1879^{[Died]}	Independent; Liberal (Classical Liberal)
	Hendrikus Wichers	Minister	Colonial Affairs	21 February 1879	12 March 1879^{[Ad interim]}	Independent; Liberal (Classical Liberal)
Otto van Rees	Otto van Rees	Minister	Colonial Affairs	12 March 1879	20 August 1879	Independent; Liberal (Conservative Liberal)

^{Ad interim} Served ad interim.
^{Died} Died in office.
