= Lienden =

- Village
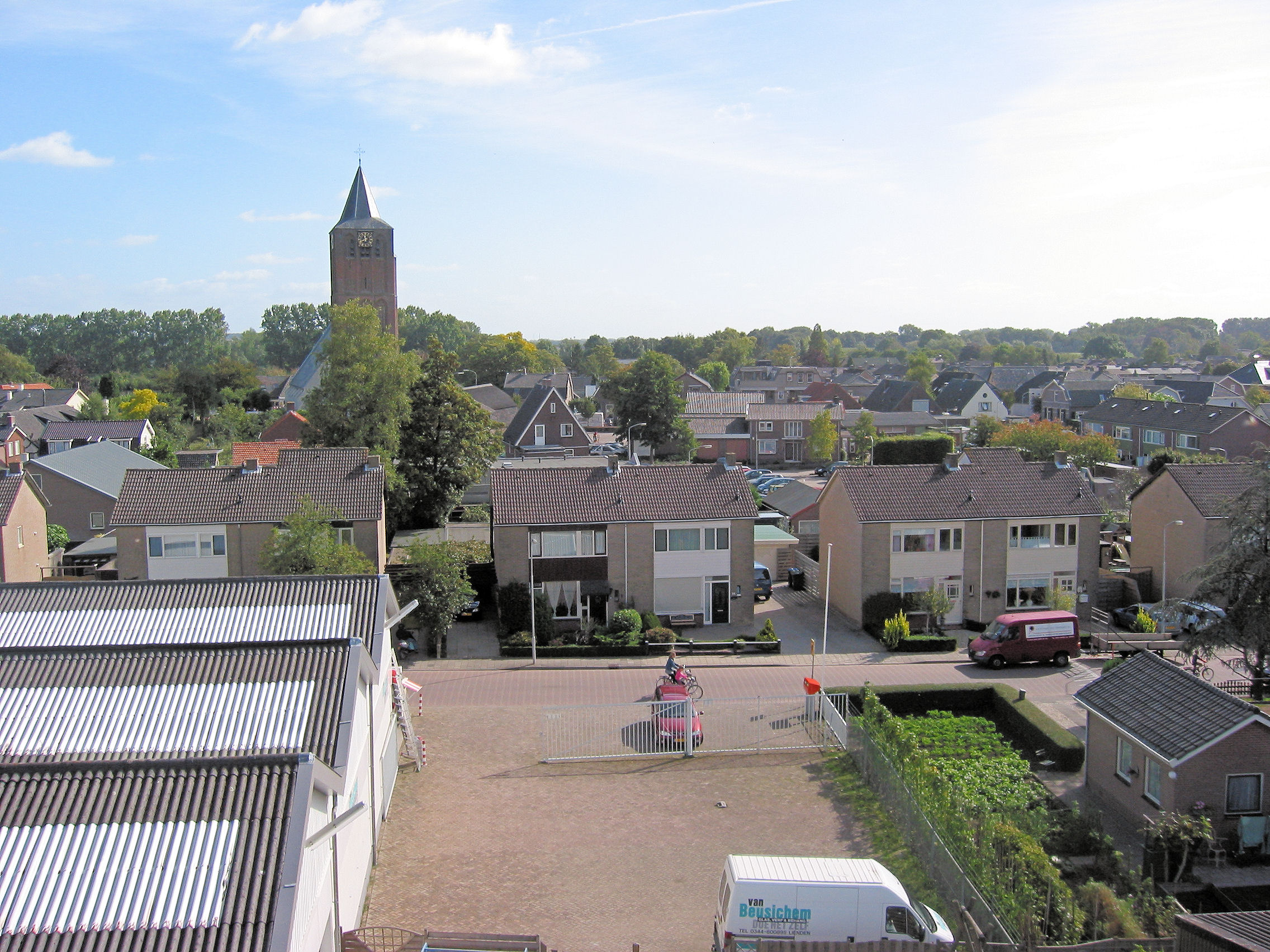
- Aerial view of Lienden

- Flag Coat of arms

- Location in the province of Gelderland Lienden (Netherlands)
- Coordinates: 51°56′48″N 5°31′05″E
- Country: Netherlands
- Province: Gelderland
- Municipality: Buren

Area
  - Total: 26.37 km^{2} (10.18 sq mi)
- Elevation: 5 m (16 ft)

Population (2021)
  - Total: 6,535
  - Density: 247.8/km^{2} (641.8/sq mi)
- Time zone: UTC+1 (CET)
  - Summer (DST): UTC+2 (CEST)
- Postal code: 4032 & 4033
- Dialing code: 0344

Lienden is a village in the Dutch province of Gelderland. It is a part of the municipality of Buren, and lies about 9 km south of Veenendaal.

Lienden was a separate municipality until 1999, when it was merged with Buren.

== History ==
It was first mentioned in 970 as Liendna. It may refer to the linden tree (Tilia), however the etymology is unclear. The village originated along the Oude Rijn, however the river became non-navigable around 1200. The Dutch Reformed Church was built around 1400, and the tower dates from 1450. In 1840, it was home to 829 people.

Windmill De Zwaan dates from 1644 and is a grist mill. It was restored in 1939-1940 and 1990. The windmill is intermediate between the old towers and the later stone windmills.

== Gallery ==
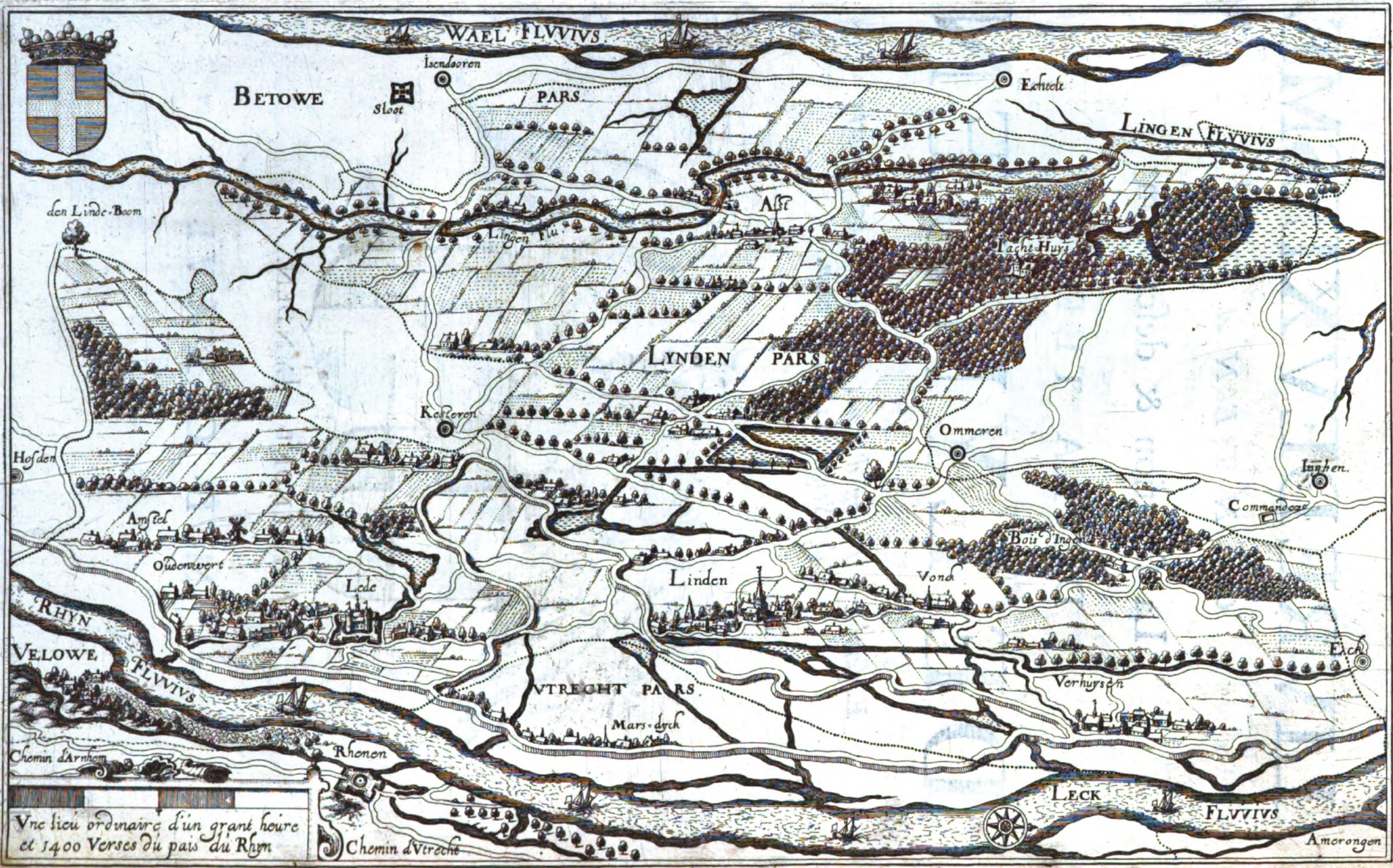
The heerlijkheid of Lienden in 1626

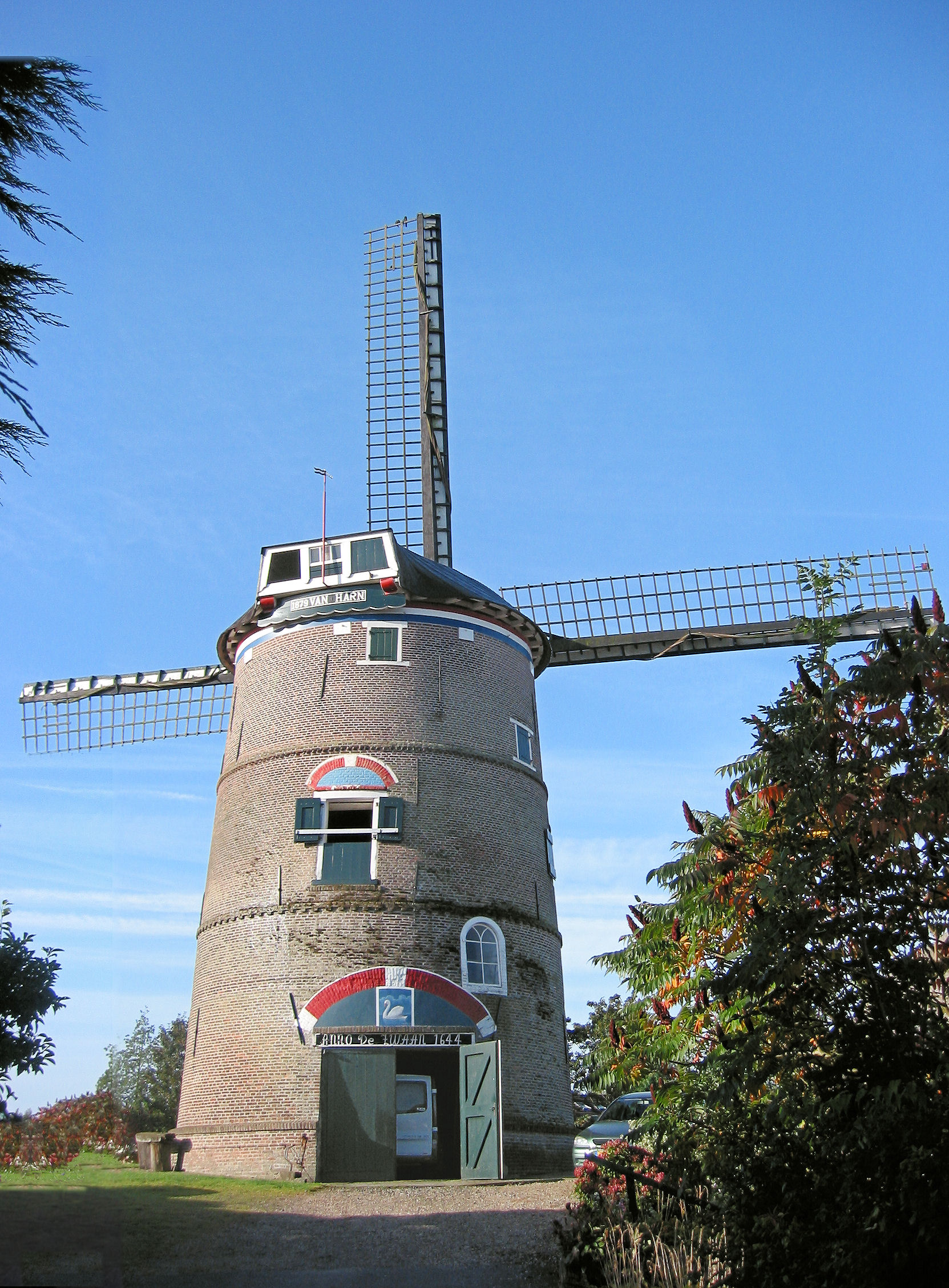
De Zwaan

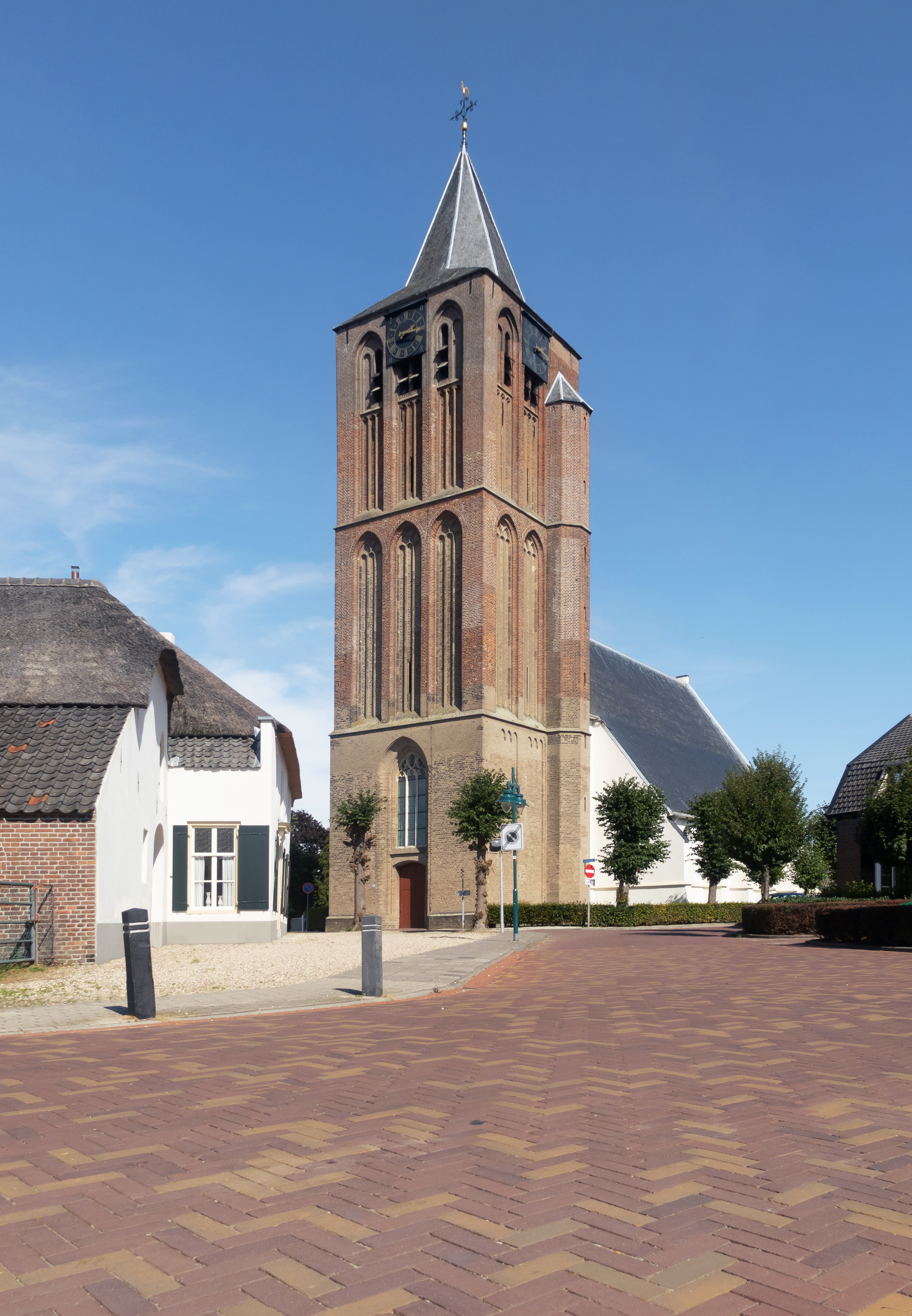
Church: the Virgin Mary

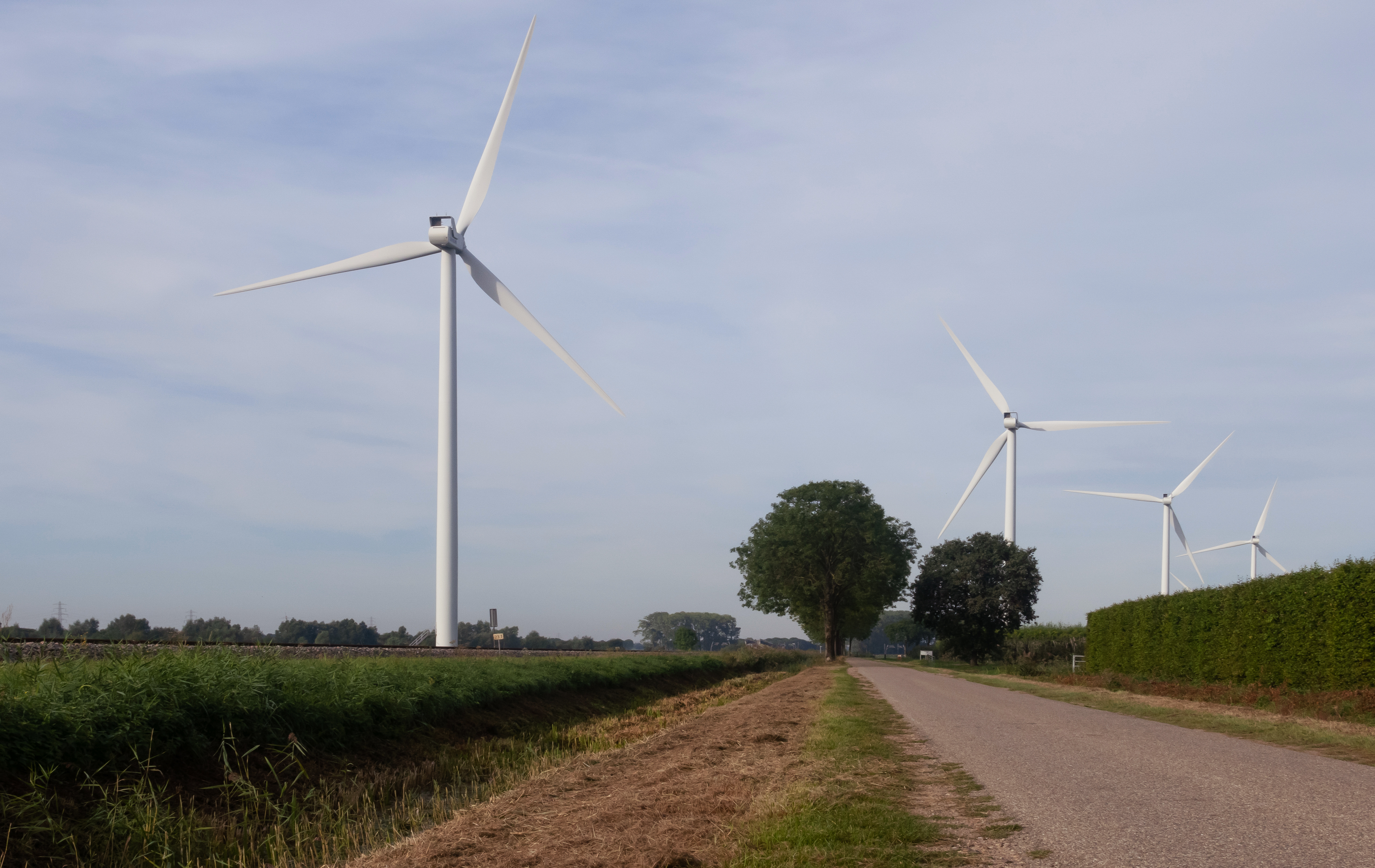
Windfarm at the Zilverlandseweg

== See also ==
- van Lynden family.
