= Heemskerk cabinet =

Heemskerk cabinet may refer to:

- Theo Heemskerk cabinet, cabinet in the Netherlands (1908–1913)
- Jan Heemskerk cabinet, cabinet in the Netherlands (1883–1888)
