= Jacobus Bloem =

Dutch politician

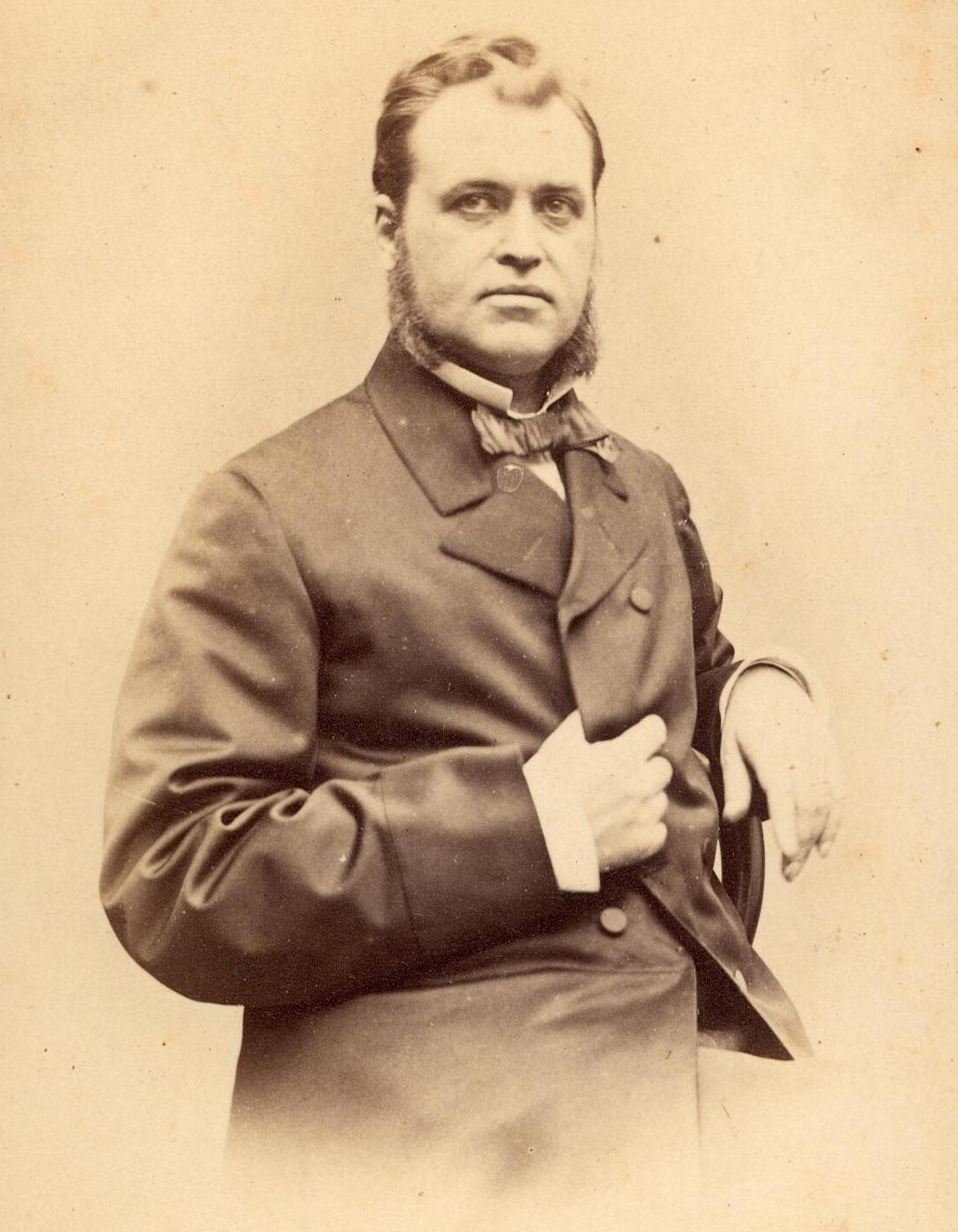
Jacobus Cornelis Bloem

Jacobus Cornelis Bloem (25 February 1822, in Tilburg – 1 September 1902, in The Hague) was a Dutch politician. He served as Minister of Finance in the Jan Heemskerk cabinet from 1885 to 1888, succeeding Willem Grobbée.
