= De Zwaan, Lienden =

Windmill in Lienden, Netherlands

De Zwaan
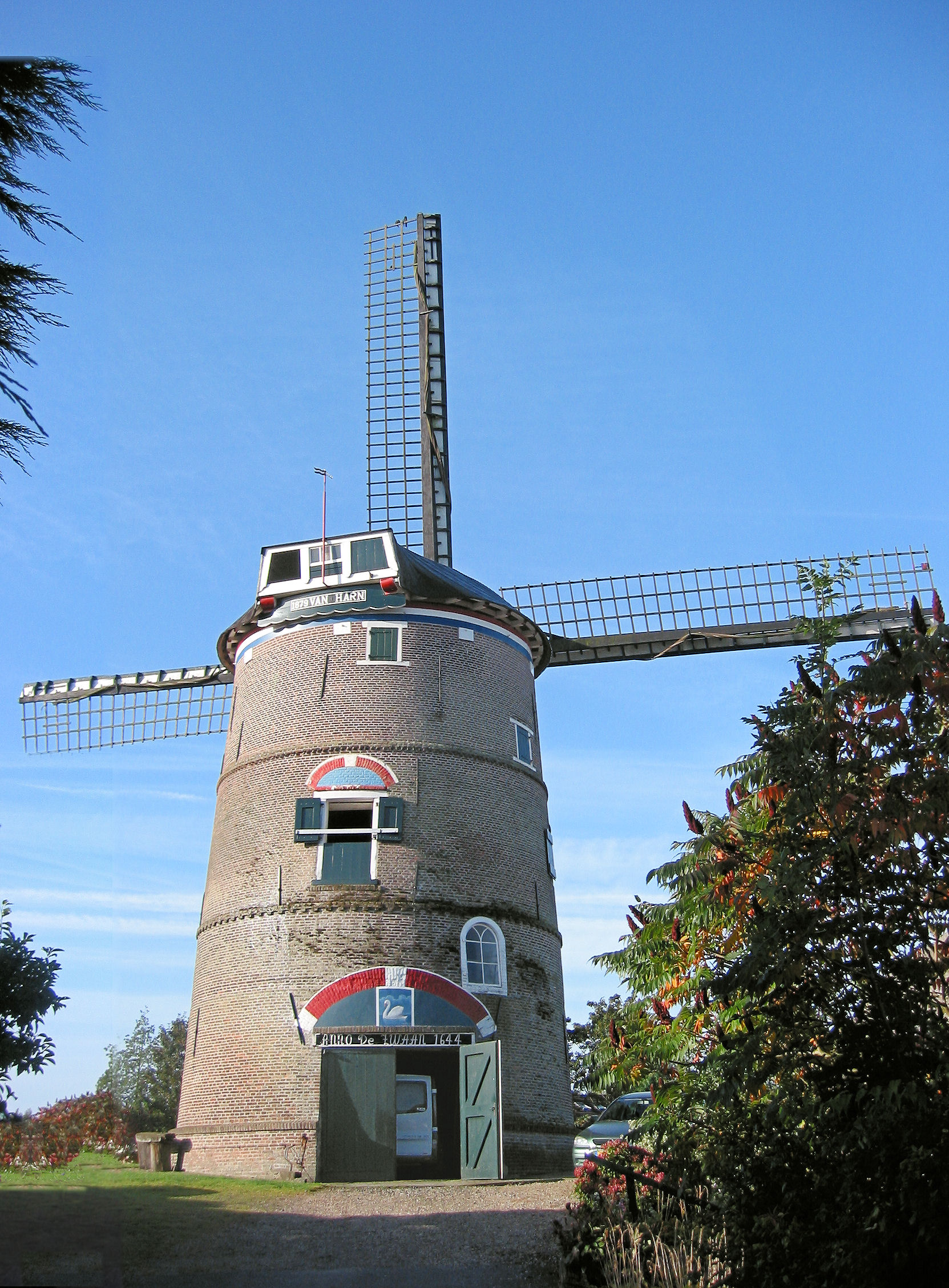
- De Zwaan, 2007

Origin
- Mill name: De Zwaan
- Mill location: Molenstraat 5-7 4033 AS Lienden
- Coordinates: 51.949257°N 5.516047°E
- Operator(s): family Van Harn
- Year built: 1644

Information
- Purpose: Corn mill
- Type: Tower mill
- Storeys: Four storeys
- No. of sails: Four sails
- Type of sails: Common sails
- Windshaft: cast iron
- Winding: Internal winding with two winches
- No. of pairs of millstones: Two pairs
- Size of millstones: 140 centimetres (4.6 ft) and 150 centimetres (4.9 ft) diameter
- Other information: Transitional shape from medieval cylindrical to post-medieval conical tower mills

De Zwaan (The Swan) is a tower mill in Lienden, the Netherlands, which is in working order. The mill was built in 1644 and is listed as a Rijksmonument, number 25834.

== History ==
De Zwaan was built in 1644 to replace an older post mill which had fallen down a year earlier. Both the older post mill and the new tower mill belonged to the heerlijkheid Lienden which was under the ownership of the lords, and later counts, of Culemborg. Through nobility and private owners the mill came into the possession of the Van Harn family in 1879. The mill was restored in 1940, 1970, 1976 after a storm had caused heavy damage and in 1990. The windmill must have had a tailpole for winding as parts for the tail were delivered during construction. There is also a wear line on the brickwork where a roller once supported the tail construction. The current internal winding winches resemble those fitted in windmills in North olland and not those in the older tower mills of Zeddam and Zevenaar. The Van Harns still own the windmill but it is operated by a volunteer miller.

== Description ==
De Zwaan is a four storey brick tower mill built on a small natural hill. The shape of the tower is regarded as a transition between the earlier thick walled cylindrical tower mills and the later thinner walled more conical shaped tower mills. The mill is winded internally by winches in the roofing felt covered cap which rests on a live curb with cast iron rollers. The four Common Sails have a span of 26.8 metres (87 ft 11 in) and are carried in a cast-iron windshaft cast by De Prins van Oranje in 1869. The windshaft also carries the brake wheel which drives the wallower at the top of the upright shaft. At the bottom of the upright shaft, the great spur wheel drives the two pairs of mill stones of 1.40 metres (4 ft 7 in) and 1.50 metres (4 ft 11 in) diameter via a lantern pinion stone nuts.

== Public access ==
The mill is open to the public on Saturdays from 10:00 to 16:00 hours and on appointment at the pet shop at the mill.
