= Nederrijn =

Dutch portion of the Rhine river

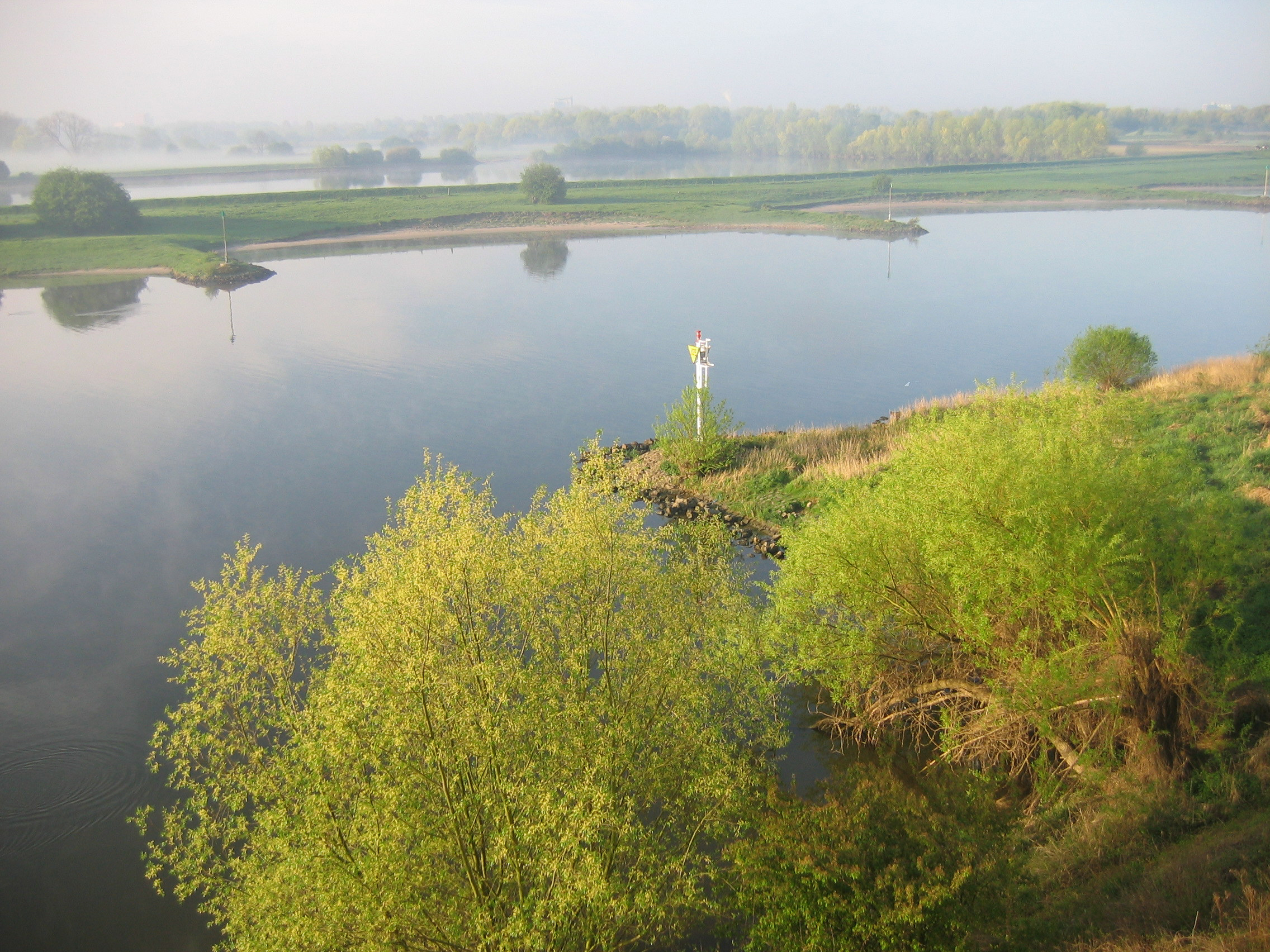
- Nederrijn near Arnhem

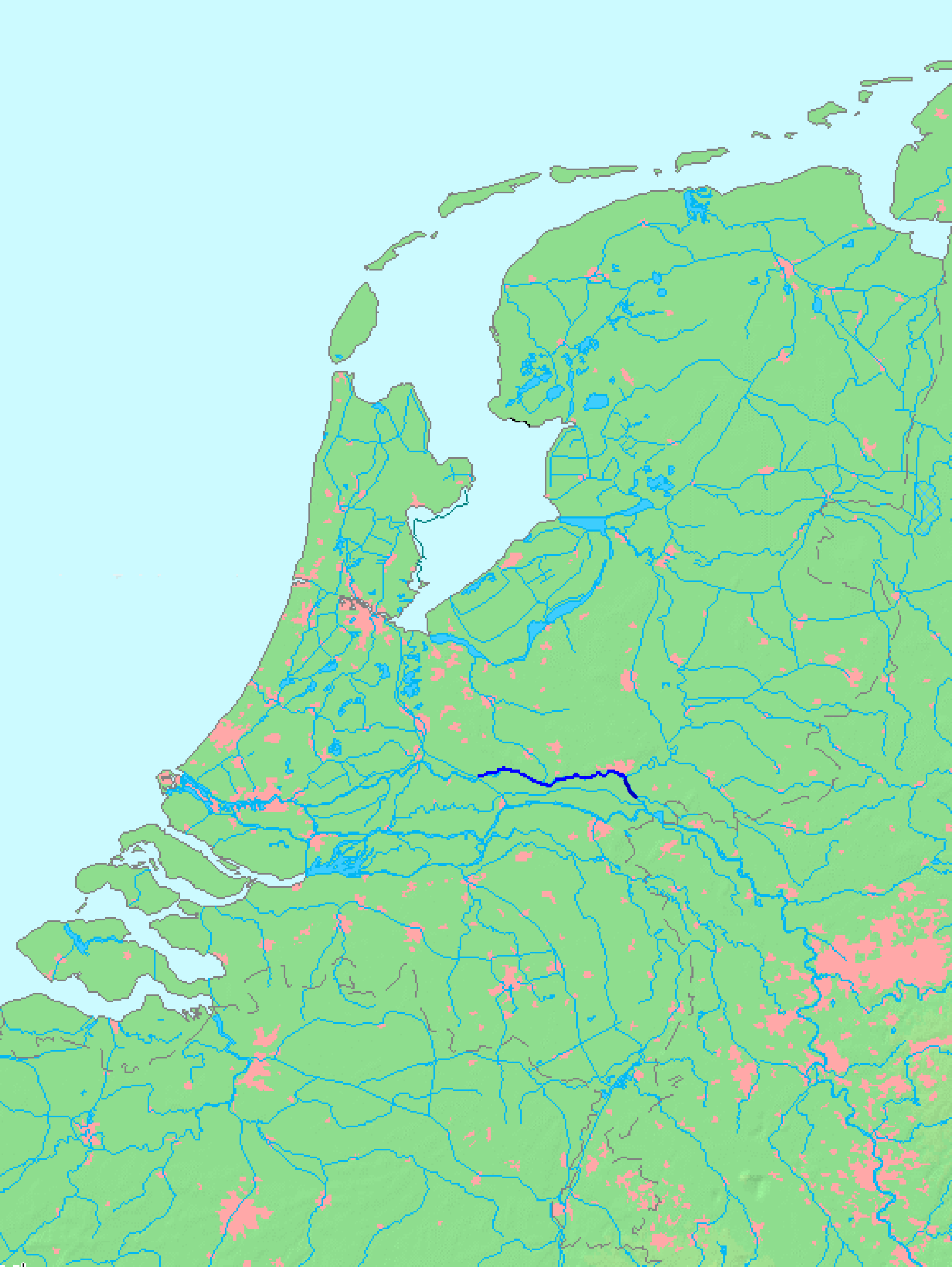
- Location of the Nederrijn

Location
- Country: Netherlands
- Region: Gelderland

Physical characteristics
- Source: Pannerdens Kanaal
  - location: Huissen, Gelderland, Netherlands 51°56′59″N 5°57′7″E
  - coordinates: 51°56′59″N 5°57′7″E
- Mouth: Lek
  - location: Wijk bij Duurstede, Utrecht, Netherlands 51°58′11″N 5°21′8″E
  - coordinates: 51°58′11″N 5°21′8″E
- Length: 50 km (31 mi)

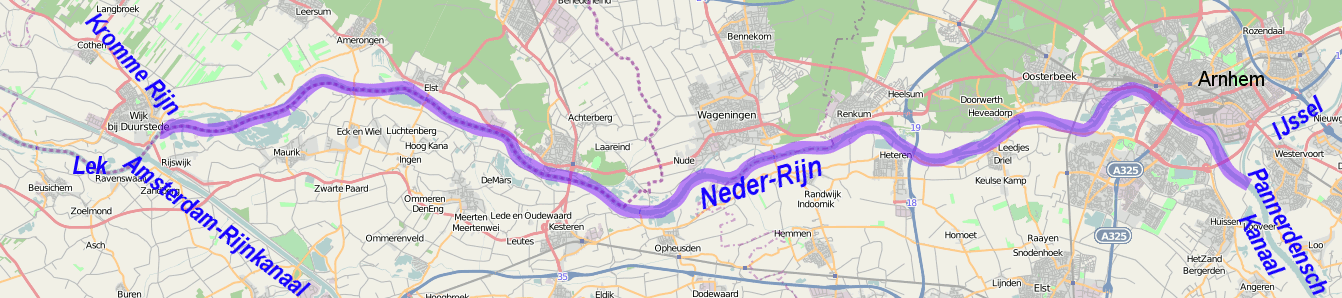
Course of the Nederrijn

The Nederrijn (Dutch pronunciation: [ˈneːdəˌrɛin]; "Lower Rhine"; distinct from the Lower Rhine or Niederrhein further upstream) is the Dutch part of the Rhine from the confluence at the town of Angeren of the cut-off Rhine bend of Oude Rijn (Gelderland) and the Pannerdens Kanaal (which was dug to form the new connection between the Waal and Nederrijn branches). The city of Arnhem lies on the right (north) bank of the Nederrijn, just past the point where the IJssel branches off. The Nederrijn flows on to the city of Wijk bij Duurstede, from where it continues as the Lek. The once-important but now small Kromme Rijn branch (in Roman times part of the Limes Germanicus and border river of the Roman Empire) carries the name "Rhine" towards the city of Utrecht.

From the city of Utrecht, the Kromme Rijn forks into the Vecht to the north, and into the Oude Rijn (Utrecht and South Holland) to the west. The first part is channelised and known as the Leidse Rijn (Leiden Rhine). After the railway bridge near Harmelen (municipality Woerden) it is known as the Oude Rijn, flowing westward to the North Sea.

In order to regulate the distribution of drainage between the different branches of the Rhine, several dams have been constructed. If the dams were to be closed, there would be little flow in the Nederrijn and most of the water would be drained by the IJssel. As for the Old Rhine, there is a pumping station near the North Sea that protects the river from sea tides and silting.

Bridges over the Nederrijn are in Arnhem (railway and three road bridges), in Heteren (A50) and Rhenen. Ferries are found near Doorwerth, Wageningen, Opheusden, Elst and Amerongen.

== History ==
In 1530, the Rhine near Arnhem was moved, a project that was completed in 1536. The city, which originated along the St. Jansbeek ("St. John's Brook'), could develop better now that it was closer to the river, and was also more easily defended against Habsburg expansionism into Guelders.

== Gallery ==
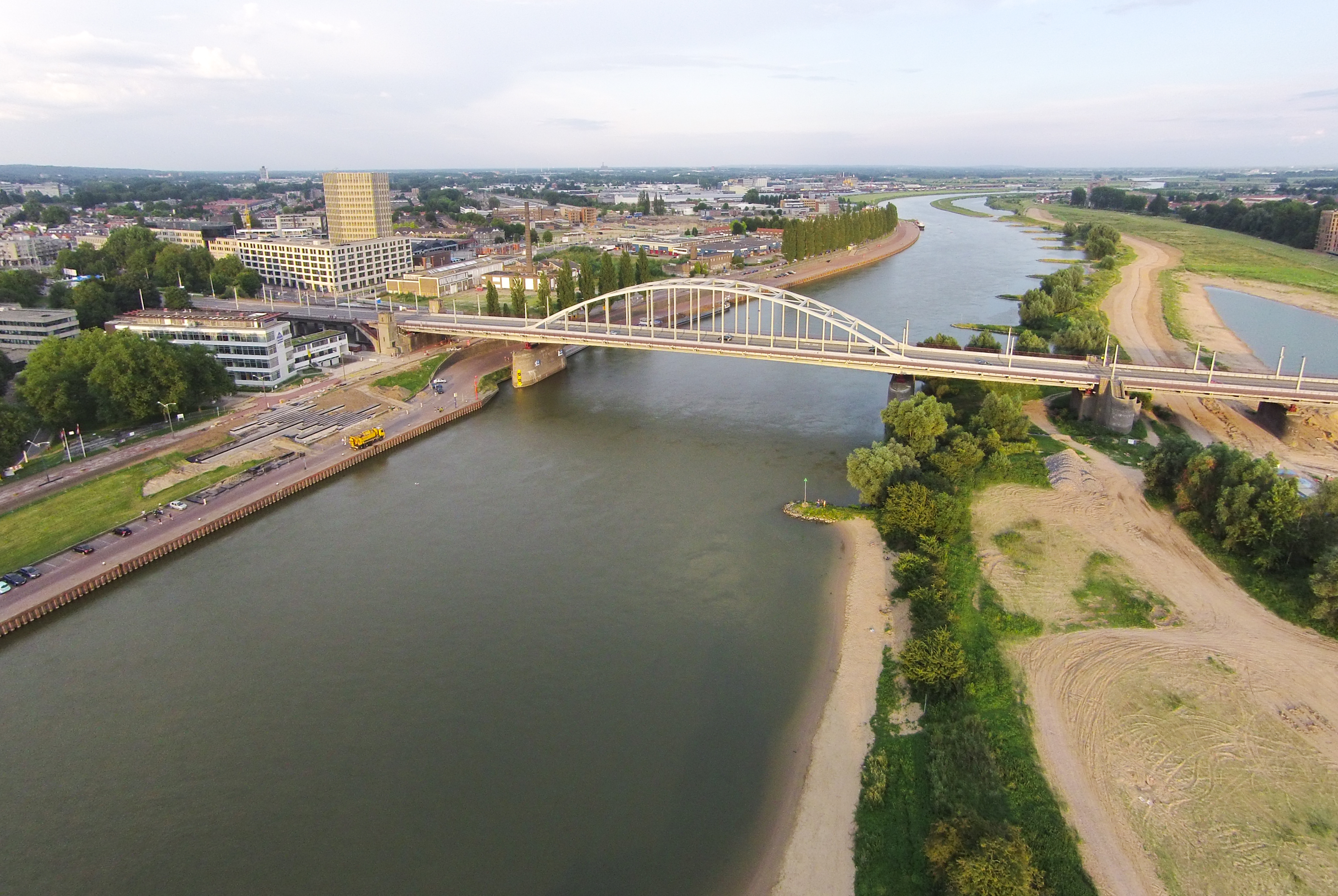
Nederrijn at Arnhem

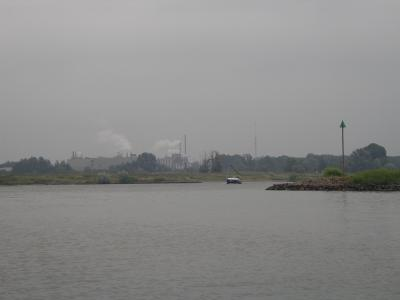
Nederrijn near Renkum

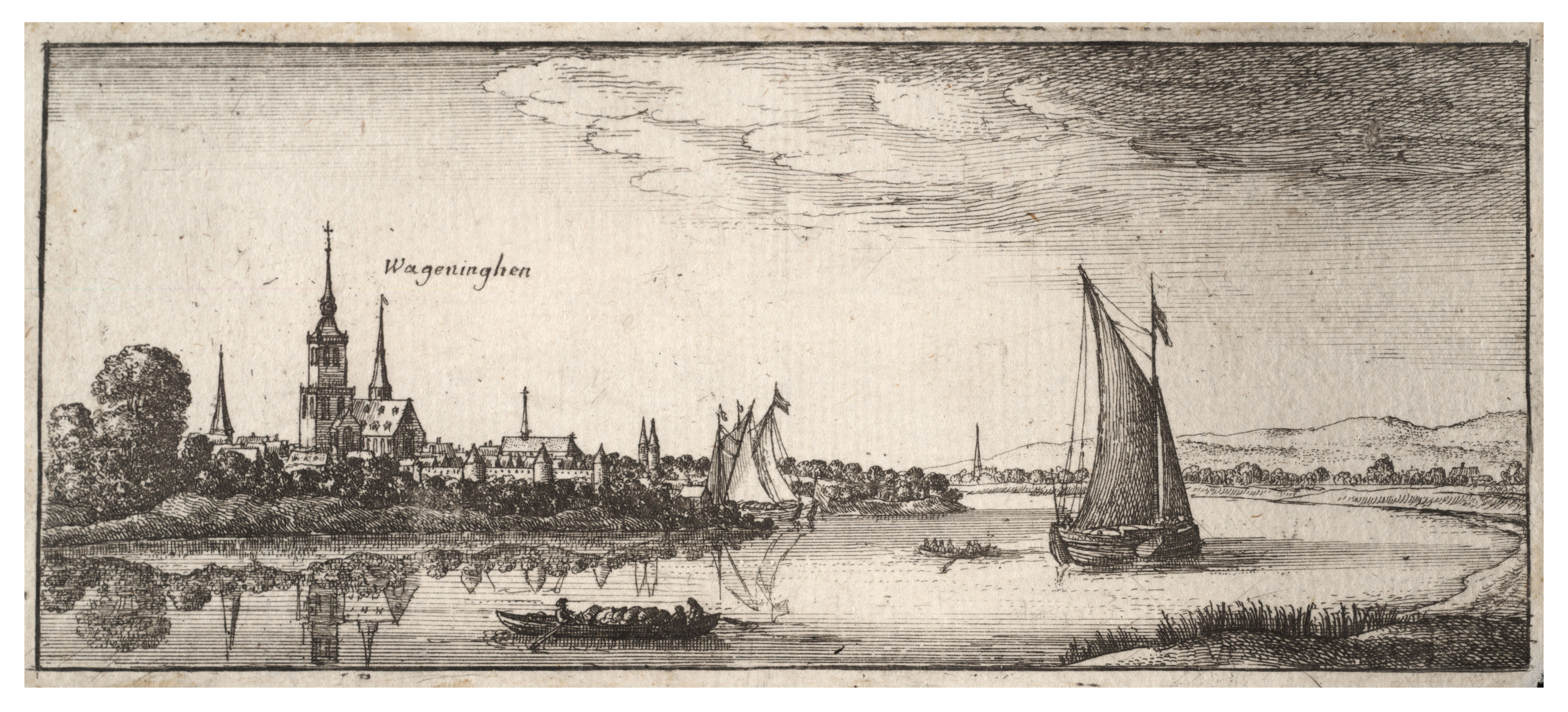
Plate made by Wenzel Hollar 1607-1677

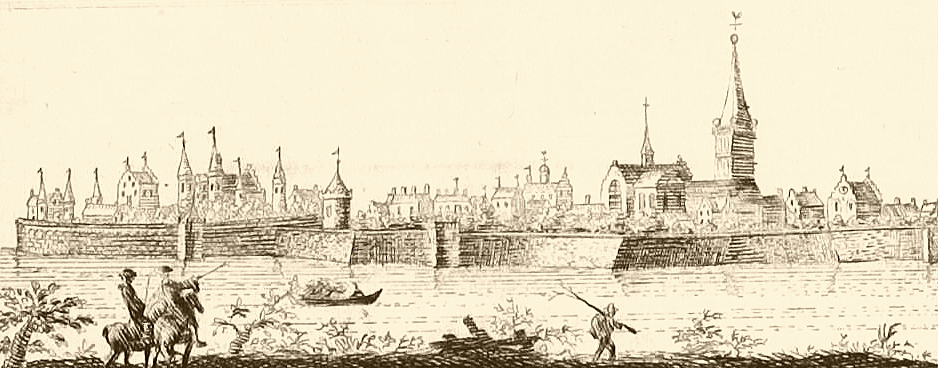
Wageningen 1730
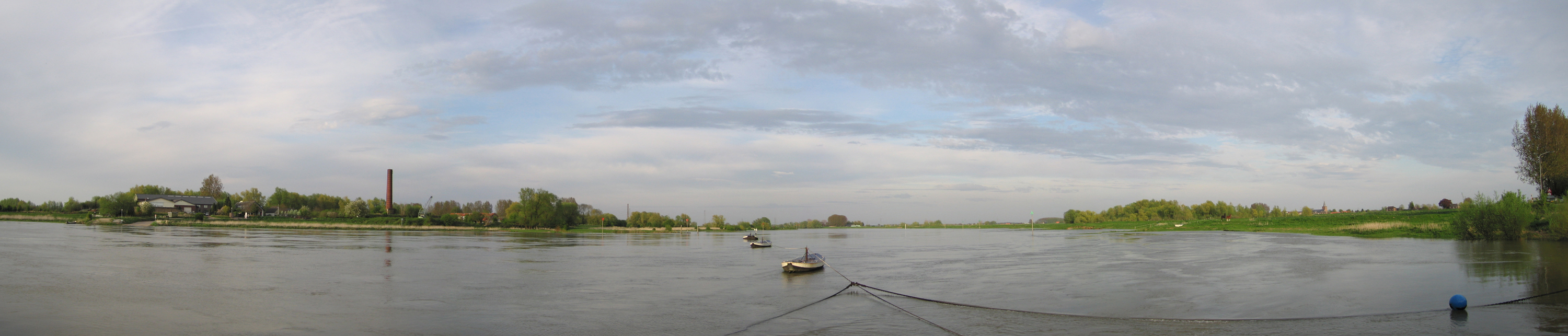
Panorama near Wageningen

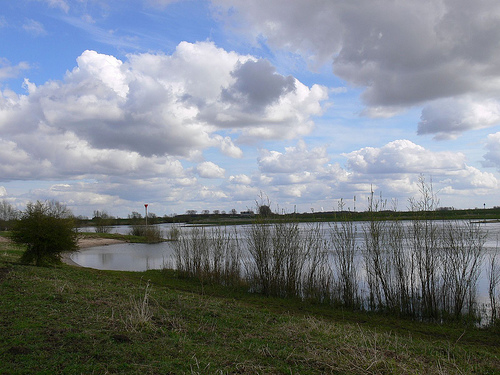
Nederrijn near Wageningen

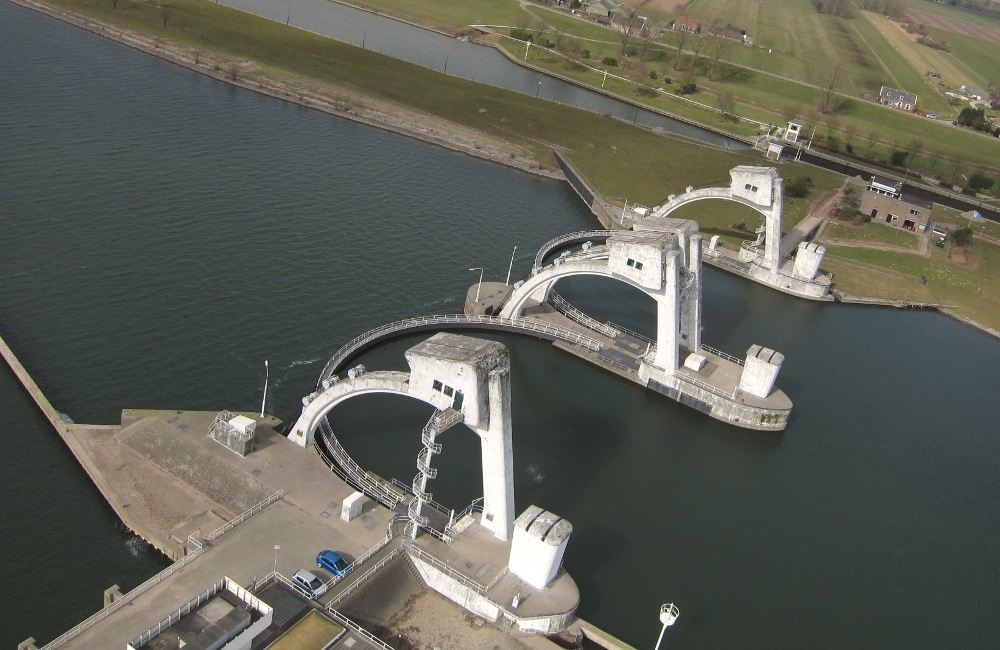
Weir near Amerongen

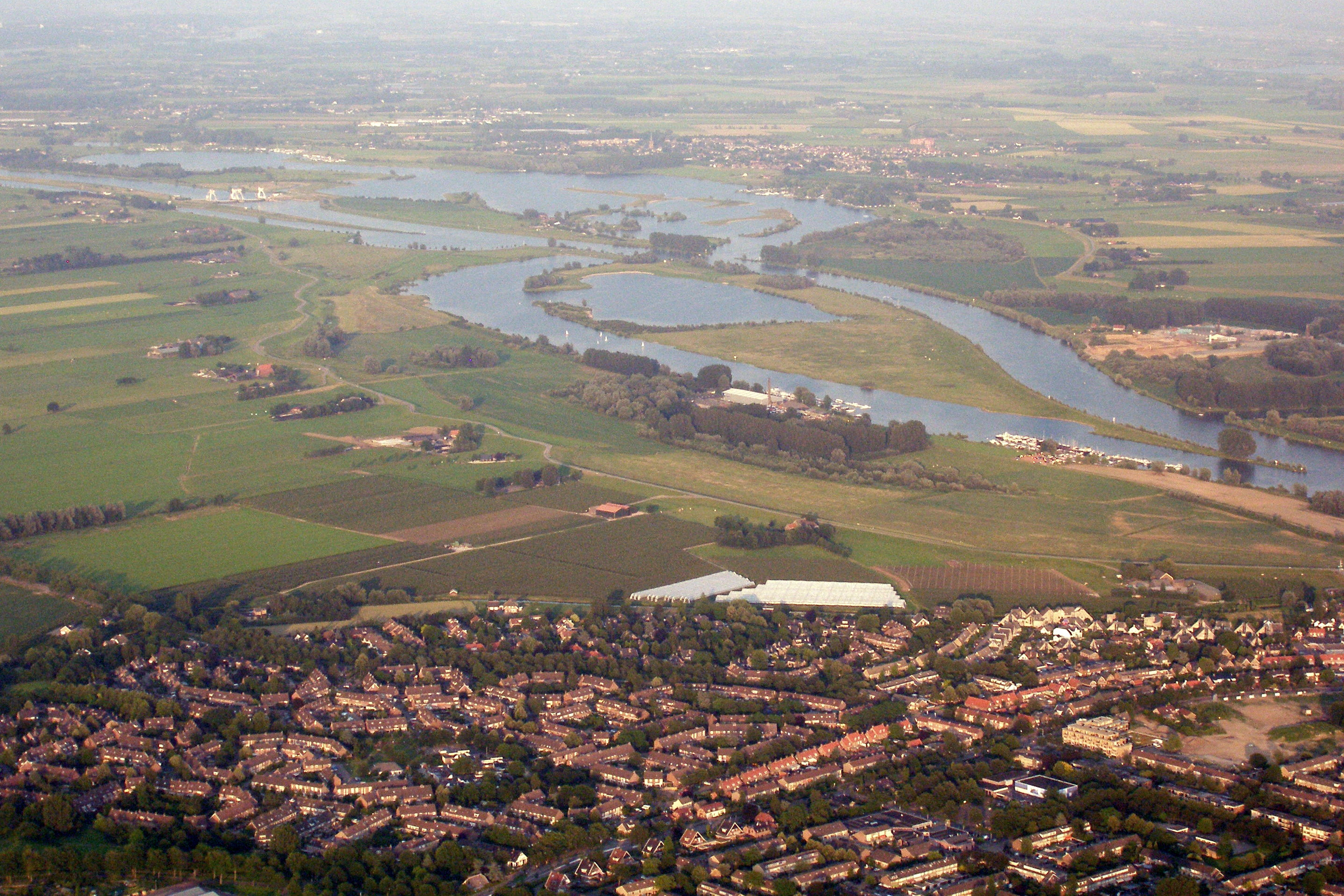
The last stretch of the Nederrijn, near Wijk bij Duurstede

== See also ==
- Lower Rhine
- Rhine delta
