= Wild (river) =

Die Wild Grenskanaal, Netterdensch Kanaal, Nederhettersche Landweer (Dutch), Netterdenscher Kanal, Niederhetterschen Landwehr (German)
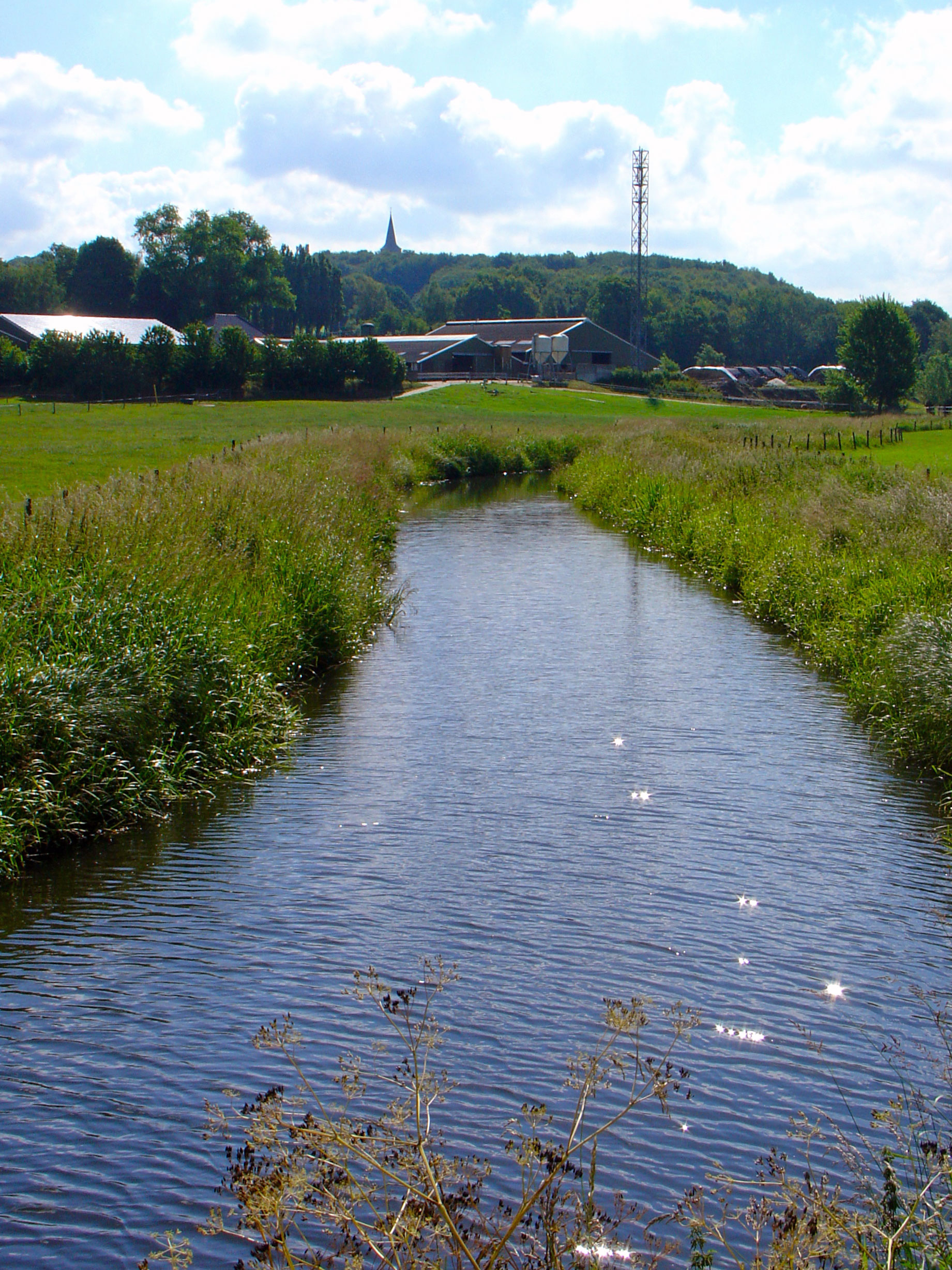
- Die Wild near Elten
- Native name: Berghsche Wetering (Dutch)

Location
- Country: Germany
- Country2: The Netherlands

Physical characteristics
- Source
  - location: 's-Heerenberg
- Mouth: Oude Rijn
  - location: Lobith
  - coordinates: 51.8697°N 6.1444°E
- Length: 28.1 km (17.5 mi)
- Basin size: 104 km^{2} (40 sq mi)

Basin features
- Progression: Oude Rijn→ Rhine→ North Sea

Die Wild (alternative names of parts of the stream are Netterdensch Kanaal, Nederhettersche Landweer (Dutch), Netterdenscher Kanal, Niederhetterschen Landwehr (German) is a small stream and tributary of the river Rhine on the border between Germany and The Netherlands. It flows south of the Dutch town of 's-Heerenberg and the German village of Elten towards the north of the Dutch village of Spijk. North of Lobith it flows into the Oude Rijn, an old branch of the Rhine.

The main tributary of this stream is the Netterdensch Kanaal coming from Netterden also along the border between the two countries. At the foot of the Eltenberg the stream broadens forming a stretched lake, the Tiefe Wild. The shores of this lake are in use as camp sites with many semi-permanent recreation bungalows.

The road from Elten to Spijk crosses the stream by means of an old bridge from WW2. This bridge is a listed monument of the municipality of Emmerich am Rhein.

== Gallery ==
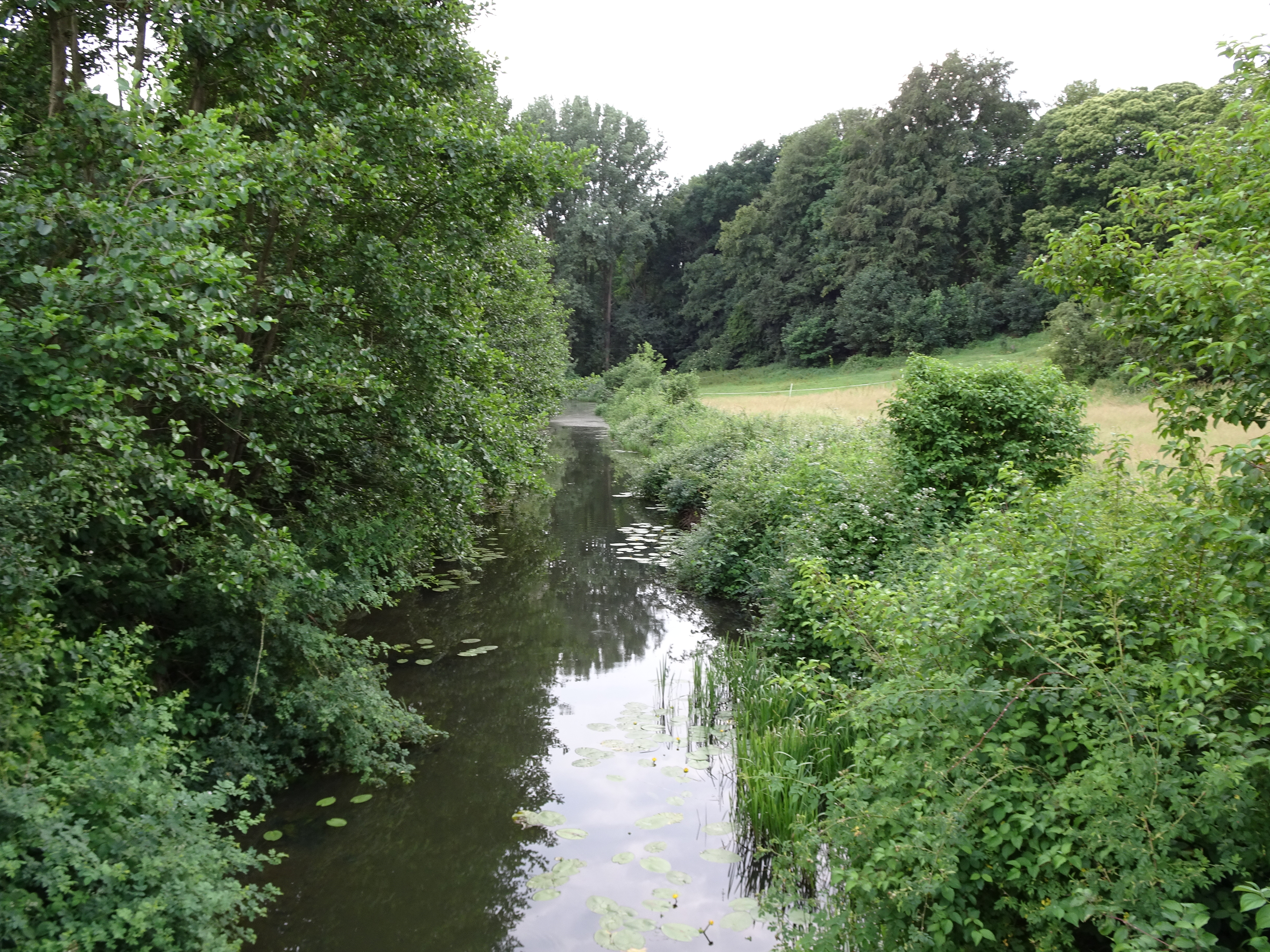
Near Gut Voorthuysen

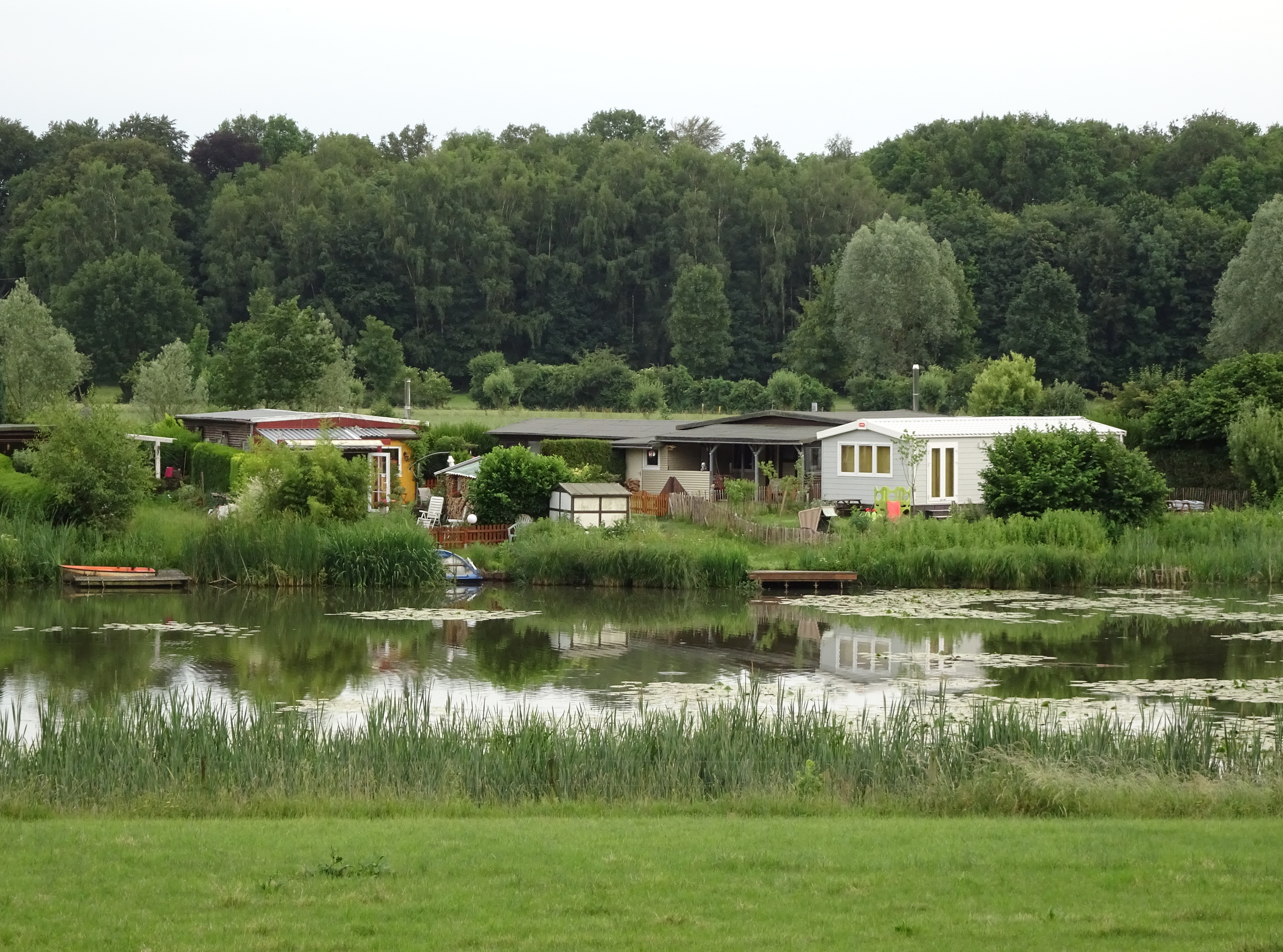
At the foot of Eltenberg, Tiefe Wild

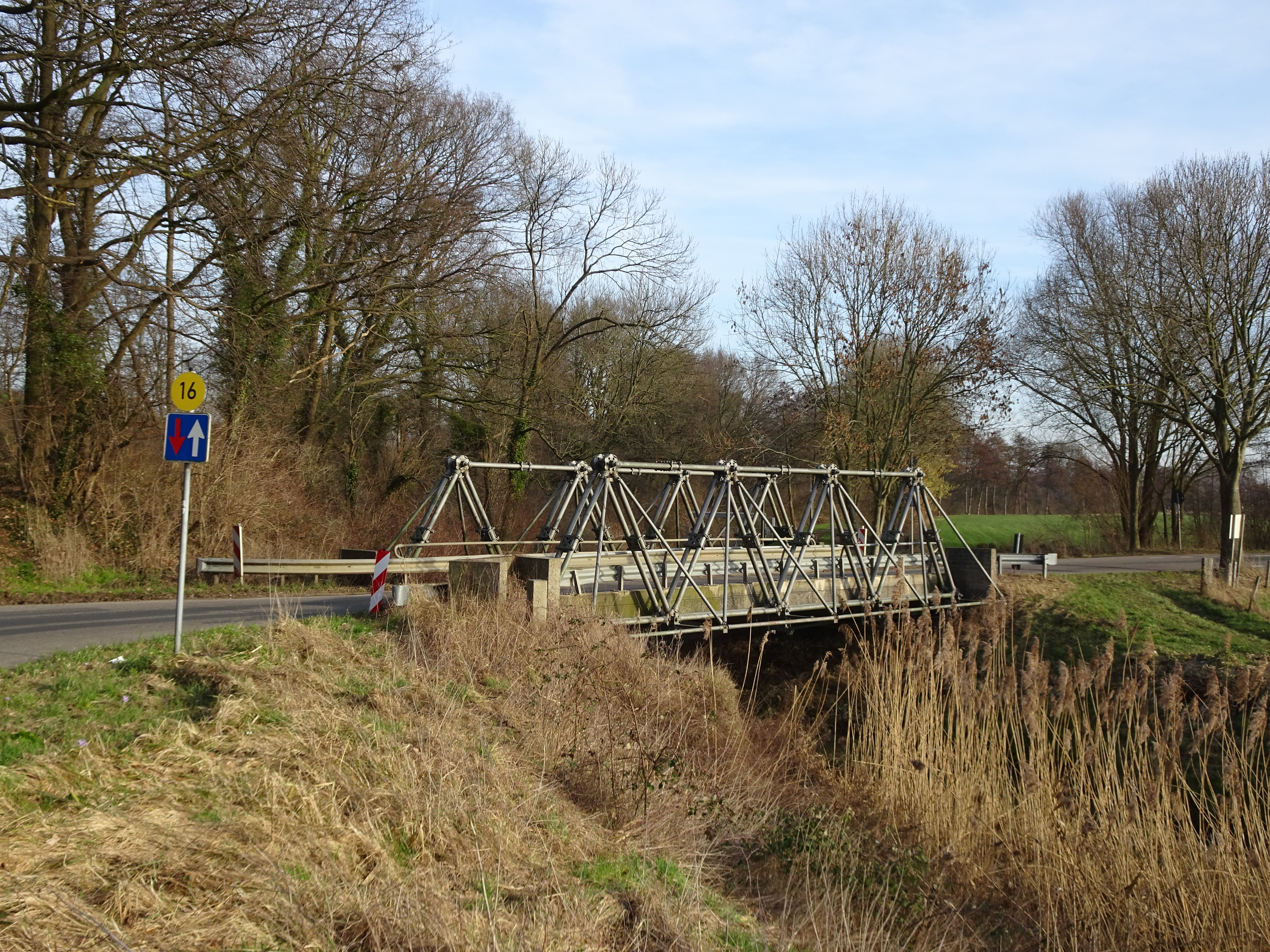
Towards Spijk, WWII-bridge

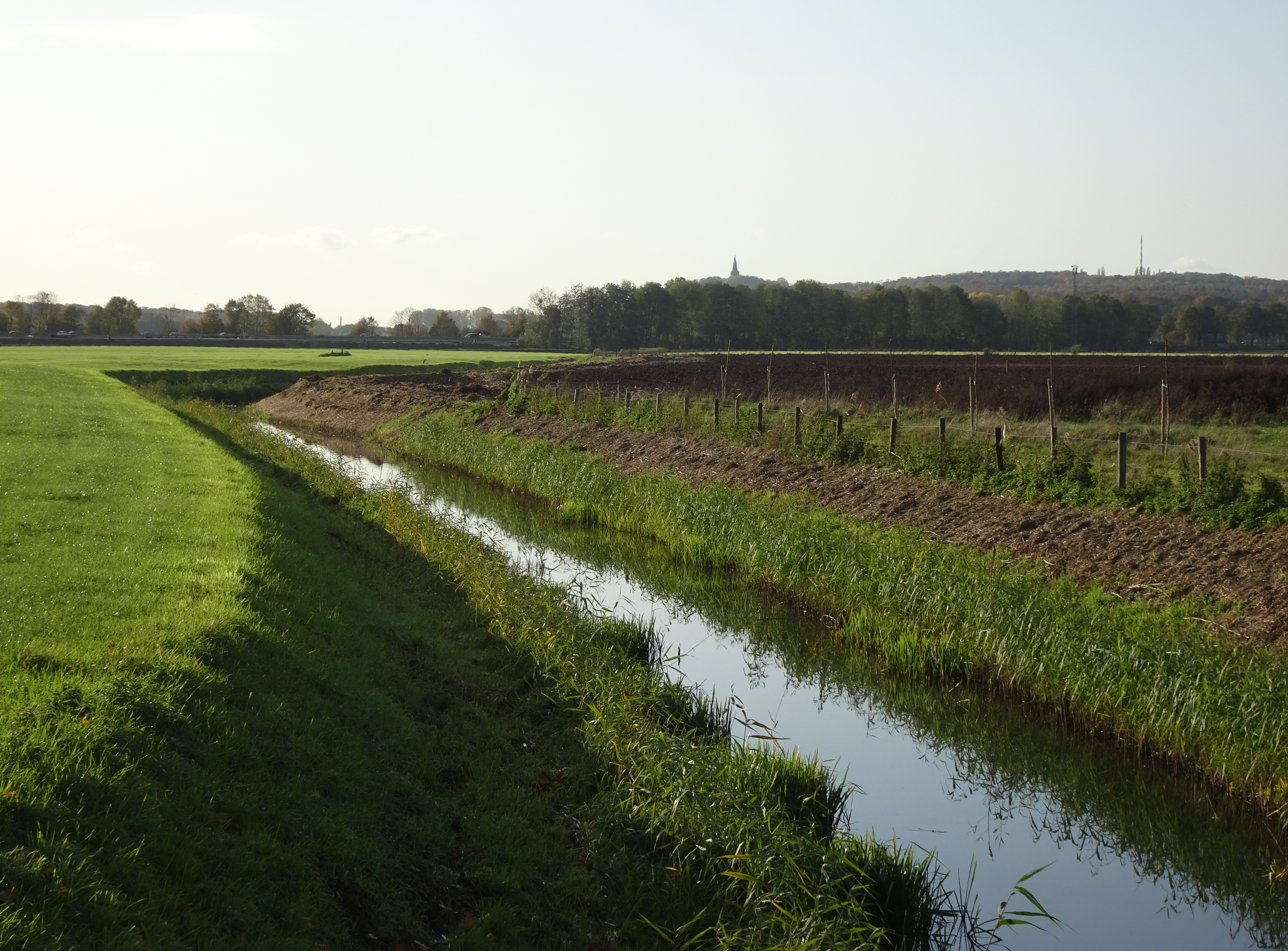
Towards Elten, Lindhorst bridge near 's-Heerenberg
