= François de Casembroot =

Dutch politician

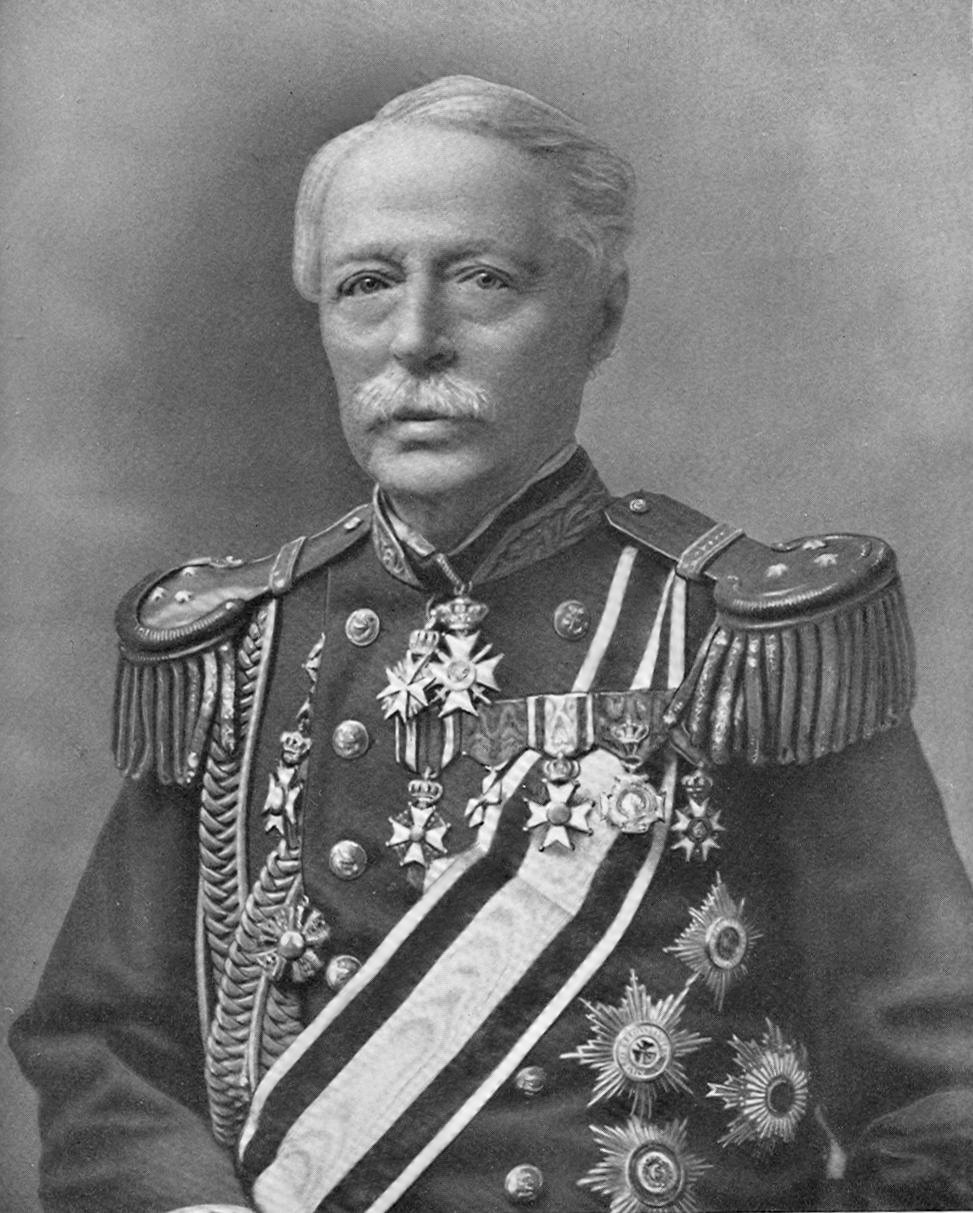
Casembroot c. 1894

François de Casembroot (Liège, 26 July 1817 – The Hague, 14 April 1895) was an officer of the Royal Netherlands Navy.

Casembroot was named Commander of the 16-gun warship Medusa, which patrolled the Japanese coast from 1862 to 1864. On July 11, 1863, the ship was attacked in the Strait of Shimonoseki by the ships and the batteries of the daimyō of Chōshū, Mōri Takachika, who was following an Imperial "Order to expel barbarians" (攘夷実行の勅命 – Jōi jikkō no chokumei). Casembroot managed to respond and escape, although with significant damage. Four sailors were killed in action, and 5 other were wounded.

The following year, in September 1864, Casembroot participated to the Allied retaliations against Chōshū, again on the Medusa, in the Bombardment of Shimonoseki.

Back in the Netherlands, Casembroot was complimented for his actions in Japan, was knighted and was decorated together with his men.

In 1865, Casembroot wrote an account of his adventures in Japan, entitled De medusa in wateren van Japan ("The Medusa in the waters of Japan").

== Notes ==
House of Representatives of the Netherlands
| Preceded by Jan Kappeyne van de Coppello | Member for The Hague; 1866–1871; With: Jacob van Zuylen van Nijevelt 1866–1867; Cornelis Ascanius van Sypesteyn 1867–1871 | Succeeded by Willem Wintgens |
| Preceded by Johannes van Kuijk | Member for Delft; 1875–1883; With: Johannes Leonardus Nierstrasz 1875–1877; Adriaan Marius Schagen van Leeuwen 1877–1881; Jan Christiaan Fabius 1881–1883 | Succeeded by Arnoldus Hyacinthus Maria van Berckel |
