= Jan Kappeyne van de Coppello =

Dutch politician

His Excellency Jan Kappeyne van de Coppello
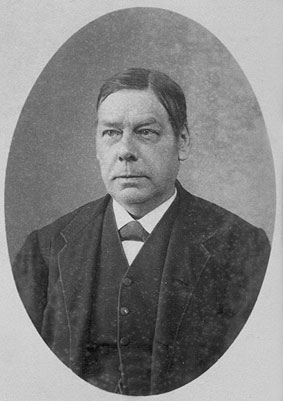

Chairman of the Council of Ministers
- In office 3 November 1877 – 20 August 1879
- Monarch: William III
- Preceded by: Jan Heemskerk
- Succeeded by: Theo van Lynden van Sandenburg

Personal details
- Born: Joannes Kappeyne van de Coppello; 2 October 1822 The Hague, Netherlands
- Died: 28 July 1895 (aged 72) The Hague, Netherlands
- Education: Leiden University
- Occupation: Lawyer

Joannes "Jan" Kappeyne van de Coppello (2 October 1822 – 28 July 1895) was a Dutch liberal politician who served as Chairman of the Council of Ministers from 1877 to 1879.

== Career ==
=== Career before politics ===
After attending the public primary school Outercourt in The Hague, Kappeyne was home schooled by his father, who was rector of the gymnasium of The Hague and taught Greek, as secondary education. Guillaume Groen van Prinsterer, a prominent Protestant-Christian politician, became his guardian after the death of his father in 1840. In that year he began to study Roman and contemporary law at Leiden University. In 1845 he became lawyer in The Hague. In 1860 Kappeyne was elected to the city council of the city, as a liberal.

=== Political career ===
In 1862 Kappeyne was elected to the Dutch House of Representatives as a liberal for The Hague. He was elected on a 'Puttian' ticket. Fransen van de Putte, who was a minister at the time, wanted to steer a more conservative colonial course. In the 1866 elections he was defeated by the conservative François de Casembroot.

In 1871 he was elected to the House of Representatives as a liberal for Haarlem, defeating the conservative Willem van Golstein. In the 1875 elections he defeat the conservative M.J. van Lennep. He became the leader of the liberals in 1876. In parliament he was known for his comical amendments.

In 1877 Kappeneye was formateur of a liberal cabinet. Kappeyne became Ministers of the Interior and gave up his seat in parliament. He was appointed chairperson of the council of ministers, an office equivalent to today's Prime Minister of the Netherlands, formally temporarily, but he was the political leader of the cabinet. As minister he enacted important laws, such as a new law on primary education. This law put higher demands on the quality of school buildings and the wages and education of teachers. This raised the financial burdens of primary schools, but only public schools received state subsidies. This effectively eliminated religious schools which, without subsidies, were unable to sustain the financial burdens. This led to staunch opposition as part of the school struggle from Anti-Revolutionary and Catholic members of parliament, and a citizens' petition. Kappeyene however did not change his mind.

On 10 June 1879 the law on the channels which he proposed was rejected by parliament. Kappeyne asked the King to dismiss him, but William III refused. On 2 July, Kappeyne asked the King to allow a constitutional revision, William III refused, and Kappeyne asked the King to dismiss him again, and William III finally dismissed Kappeyne. Behind the fall of the Kappeyne cabinet lay a conflict between the factions of the progressive liberals and the more moderate liberals.

=== Career after politics ===
In 1879, Kappeyne returned to his lawyer's office in The Hague. He unsuccessfully attempted to regain a seat in parliament in the 1880, 1883 and 1884 elections. In 1880 he was defeated in the district of Amsterdam by the liberal Johan George Gleichman, in 1883 in Amsterdam by the liberal conservative Adriaan Gildemeester, and in 1884 by the liberal Jacob Duyvis. He remained lawyer until his death in 1895. In this period he refused a request by Leiden University to become honorary professor of law.

In 1888 Kappeyne was elected into the Senate as a liberal for North Holland. In the Senate, Kappeyne took a more conservative course as he had previously done and remained a backbencher.

== Miscellaneous facts ==
- He was seen as an amusing debater, a workaholic and a skilled lawyer;
- The name Kappeyne, which was his great-grandmother's (Gerardina Maria Kappeyne), was added in 1811 to the name Van de Coppello by his father, Johannes Kappeyne van de Coppello;
- He was known to work in the night until dawn, preferably in his dressing gown or nightshirt, lying on the floor of the living room, surrounded by books and papers;
- Kappeyne did not care particularly for clothes and appearances, he often looked ragtag;
- He was made Knight in the Order of the Dutch Lion in 1874 and he was promoted to Commander in the order of the Dutch Lion in 1878;
- Kappeyne remained unmarried;
- He was a member of the Dutch Reformed Church.

House of Representatives of the Netherlands
Preceded by Isaäc Paul Delprat	Member for The Hague; 1862–1866; With: Willem Theodore Gevers Deynoot 1862–1864; Jacob van Zuylen van Nijevelt 1864–1866	Succeeded by François de Casembroot
Preceded by Willem van der Hucht	Member for Haarlem; 1871–1877; With: Charles Mirandolle	Succeeded by Willem de Meijier
Political offices
Preceded by Jan Heemskerk	Minister of the Interior; 1877–1879	Succeeded by Willem Six
Preceded by Jan Heemskerk	Chairman of the Council of Ministers; 1877–1879	Succeeded by Theo van Lynden van Sandenburg
