= Langbroek =

- Village
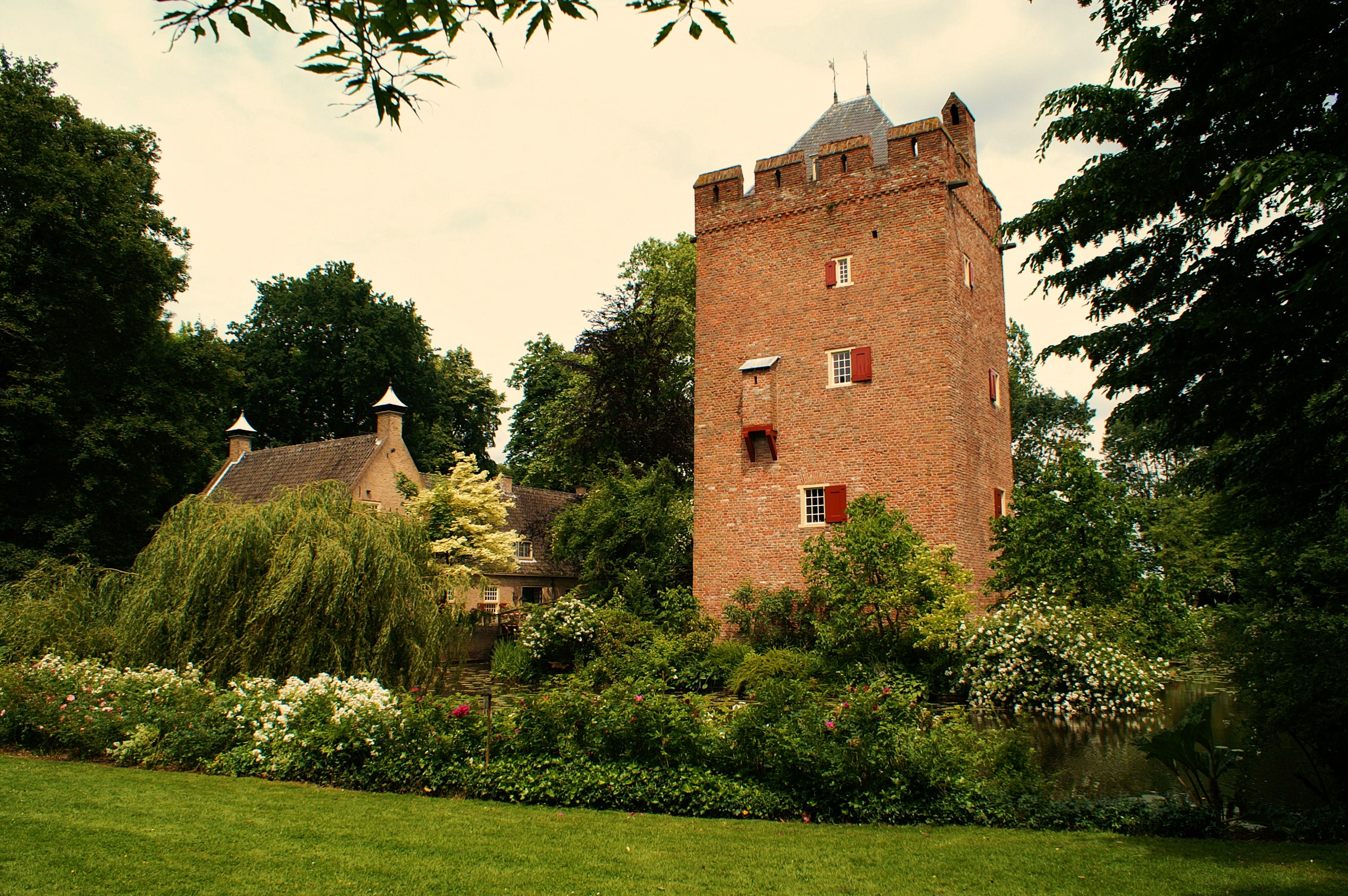
- Castle Lunenburg

- Coat of arms

- Location in the Netherlands Langbroek (Netherlands)
- Coordinates: 52°0′44″N 5°19′37″E
- Country: Netherlands
- Province: Utrecht
- Municipality: Wijk bij Duurstede

Area
  - Total: 17.90 km^{2} (6.91 sq mi)
- Elevation: 4 m (13 ft)

Population (2021)
  - Total: 2,430
  - Density: 136/km^{2} (352/sq mi)
- Time zone: UTC+1 (CET)
  - Summer (DST): UTC+2 (CEST)
- Postal code: 3947
- Dialing code: 0343

Langbroek is a village in the Dutch province of Utrecht. It is a part of the municipality of Wijk bij Duurstede, and lies about 11 km southeast of Zeist. The village is the merger of Overlangbroek and Nederlangbroek

Until it merged with Wijk bij Duurstede in 1996, Langbroek was a separate municipality.

== History ==
Langbroek was the result of a cultivation project of the swamp area. Two settlements appeared: Nederlangbroek and Overlangbroek. Overlangbroek was first mentioned in 1219 as Langebruke, and means "long stretched out swamp". Nederlangbroek was first mentioned in 1337 Nederlanghbroech and has neder (lower) to distinguish from over (upper). Overlangbroek was a little agricultural settlement near Castle Zuilenburg where a church was built around 1335. Around 1900, both villages merged into a single build-up area.

There were many castle-like towers in Langbroek. Weerdesteyn is a square tower which dates from around 1300. It was restored and enlarged in 1870 to 1871 and 1875 and 1876.

Hindersteyn started as a square tower in the 14th century. In the 17th century, two wings were added, and in 1876, the western wing was demolished and replaced by a neo-Gothic building. During the 19th century, it was enlarged twice, but returned to the 1865 layout during the restorations in 1976 and 1989.

Lunenburg dated from the 13th century, and was transformed into a manor house at the end of the 18th century. In 1944, it was partially destroyed by bombs and demolished in 1968. Between 1968 and 1970, Lunenberg was restored to its medieval form.

In 1840, Langbroek was home to 1,096 people. In 1978, the postal authorities no longer differentiated between the two villages. It used to be an independent municipality until 1996 when it was merged Wijk bij Duurstede.

== Gallery ==
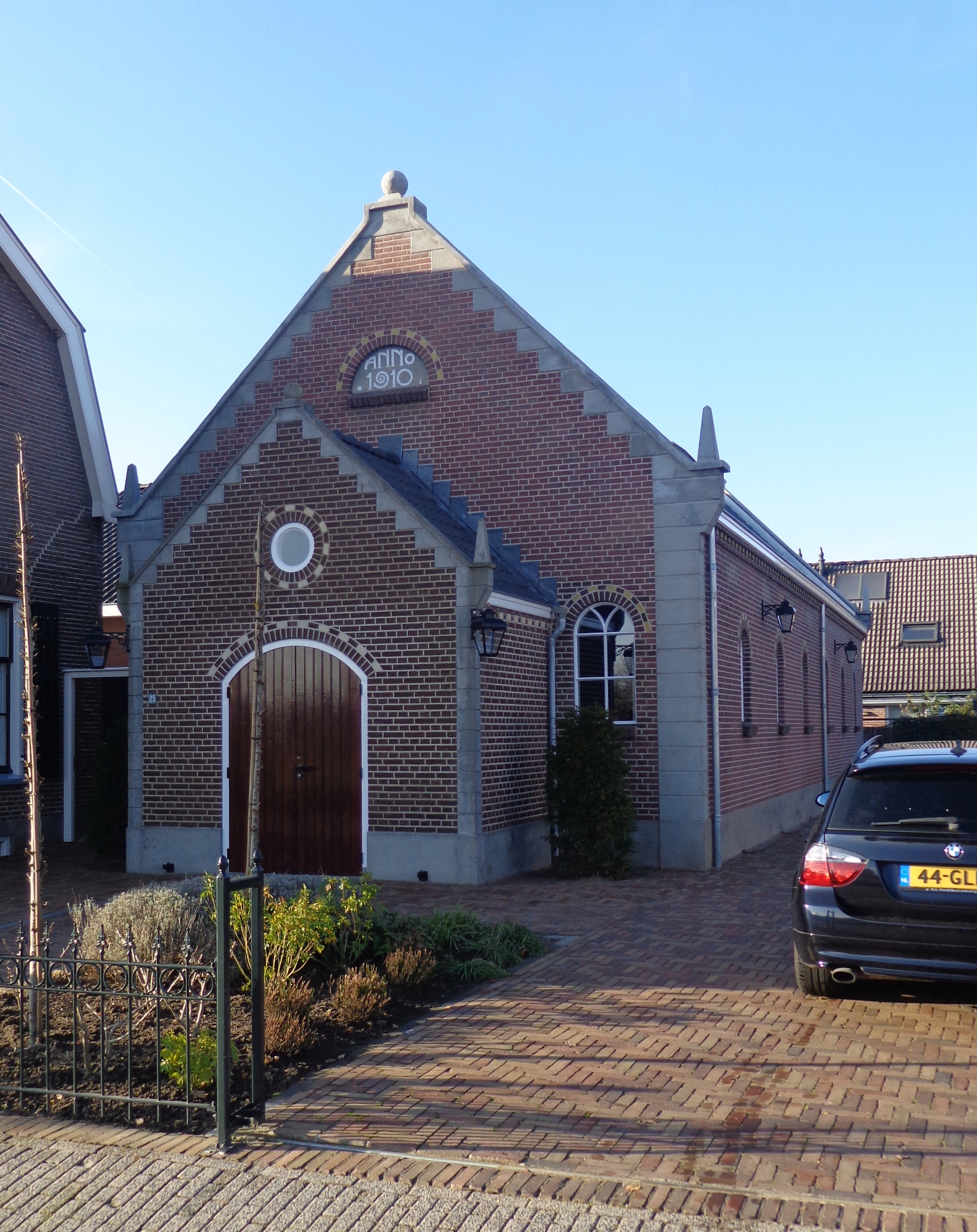
Little church in Langbroek

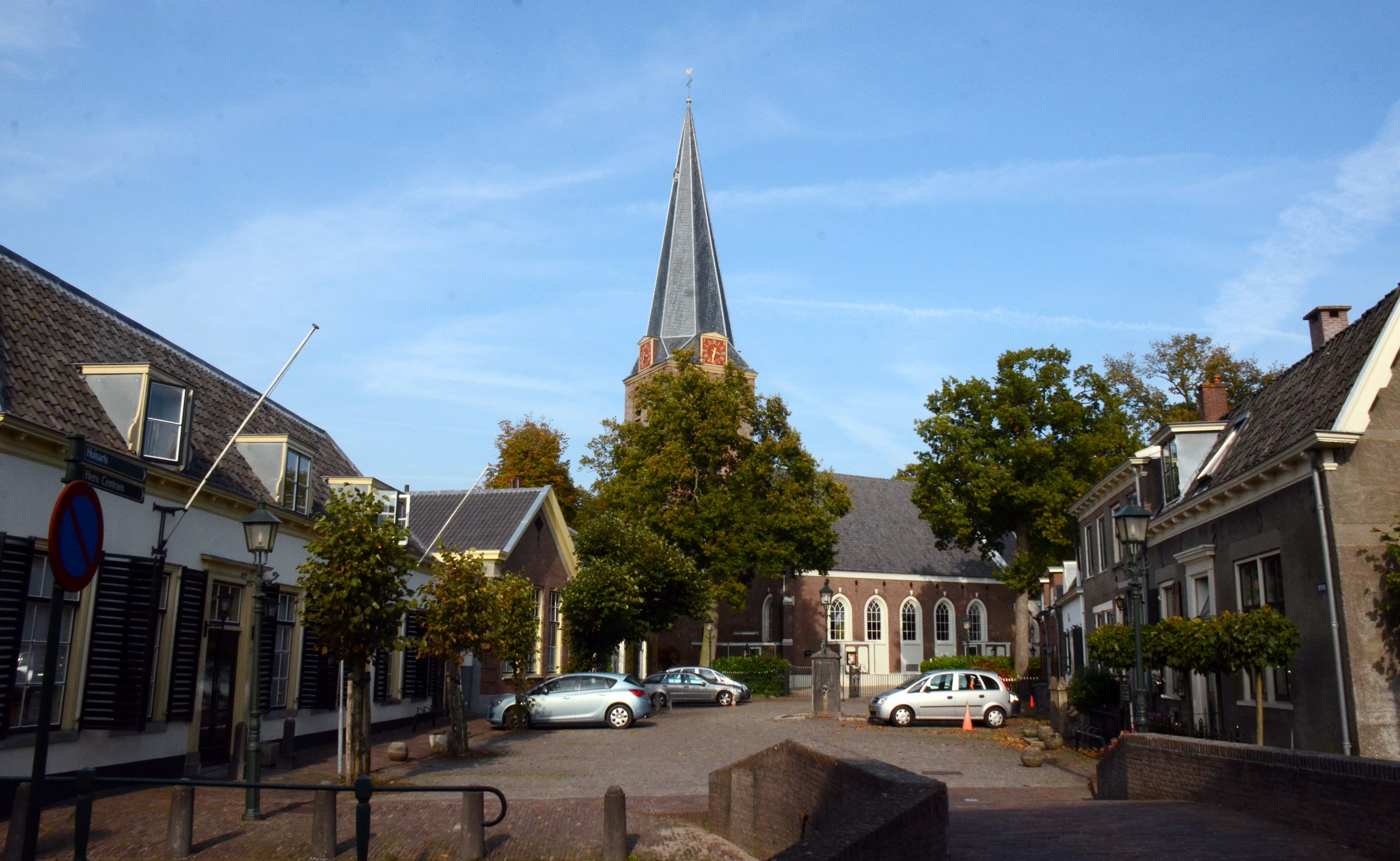
Street view

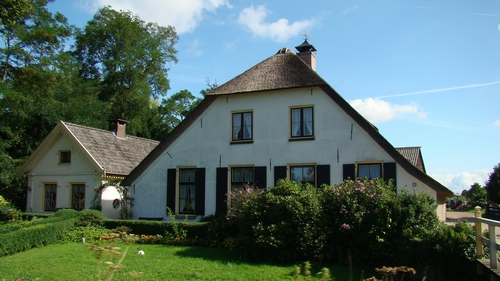
Farm in Langbroek

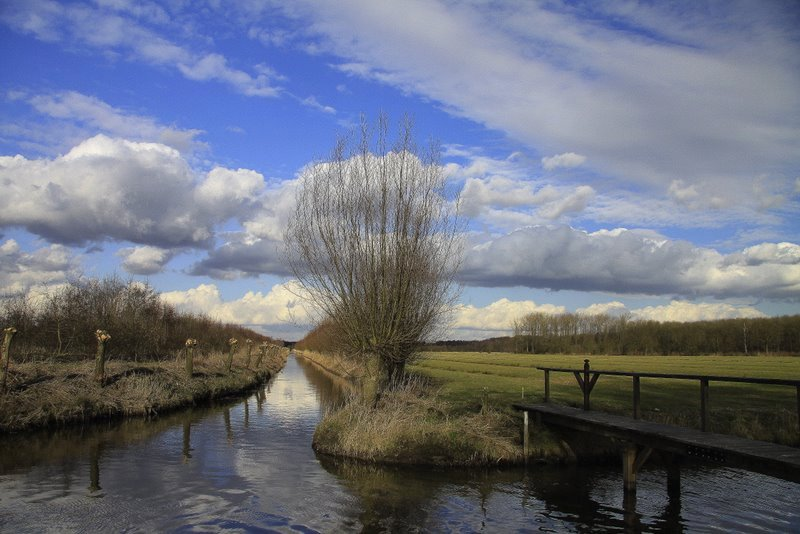
Landscape near Langbroek
