= Oude Rijn (Gelderland) =

River in Gelderland, the Netherlands

Coordinates: 51.896°N 6.089°E

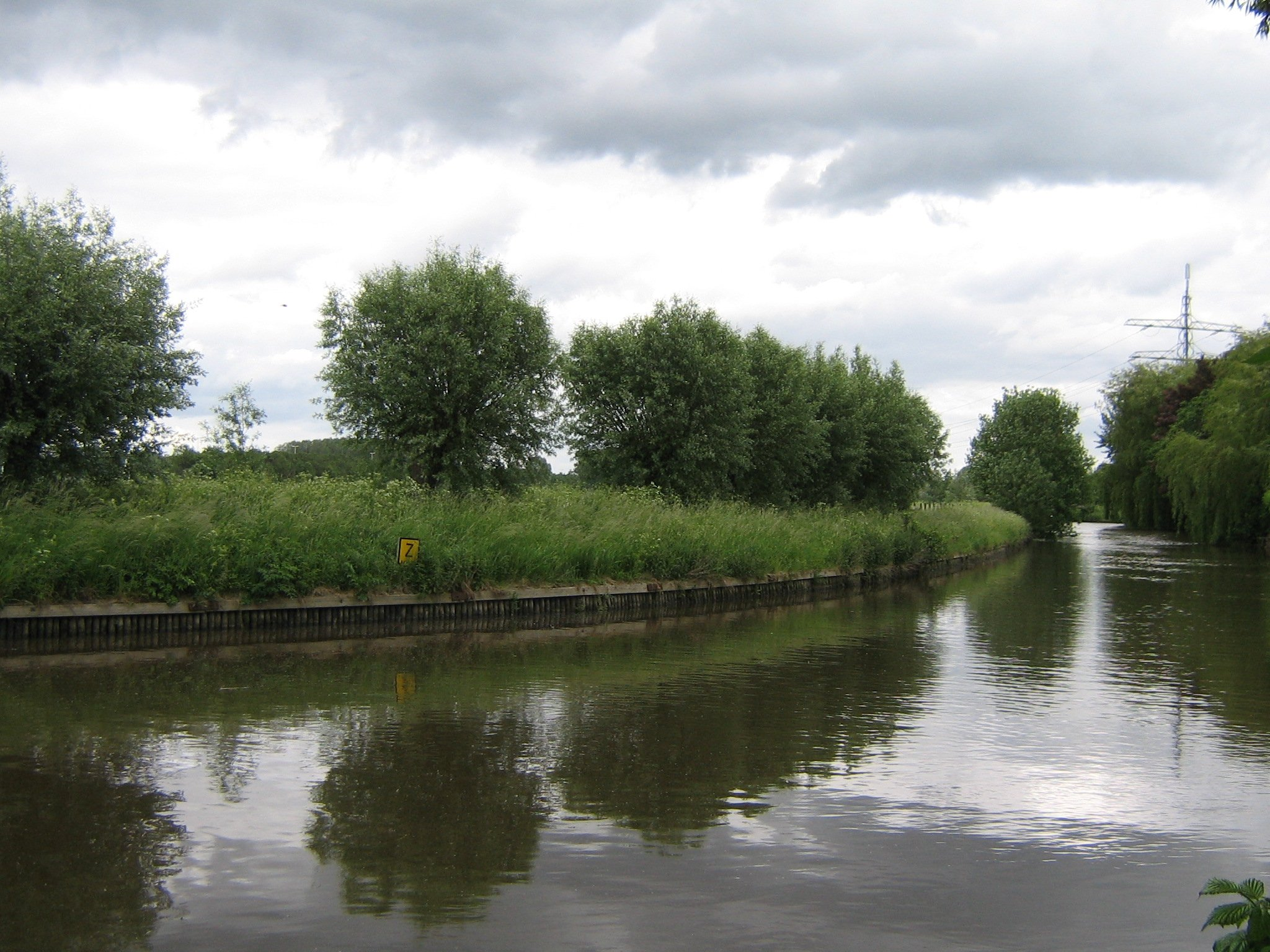
The Oude Rijn (Old Rhine) river near Bunnik (NL), former main course of the river Rhine in the Netherlands before it was diverted to the south. 2006

Oude Rijn ("Old Rhine"; not to be confused with the Alter Rhein) is the name of a long former bend in river Rhine in the Dutch province of Gelderland.

In summer the bend became too shallow to be navigable, and so between 1701 and 1709 it was cut off from the main waterway near the town of Lobith and replaced by the Pannerdens Kanaal. After the bend was dammed-up at Tolkamer, the Oude Rijn received little water from the Rhine proper. Instead, most of its inflow now comes from the small river Wild. Near the Oude Rijn are several more, smaller, Old Rhine branches. Together they are known as the Rijnstrangen ("Rhine Bends"), a wildlife reserve area that is part of the Gelderse Poort.

The Oude Rijn, which forms the border between the Dutch town of Lobith and the German town of Elten, was still used to relieve the overflow of the Rhine in times of flooding until the middle of the twentieth century. Opposite the town of Angeren, the Pannerdens Kanaal connects to the Oude Rijn, after which the river continues towards the sea as Nederrijn (Lower Rhine).
