= House of Lynden =

Dutch noble family

van Lynden
- noble family
- Coat of Arms
- Country: Netherlands; Belgium
- Founded: 14th century

The House of Lynden is one of the oldest families of the Dutch nobility, originating in the Duchy of Guelders. This family later gave rise to different branches. Most remained in the Netherlands and produced several Dutch politicians, ministers, and military leaders.

== History of the family ==
The oldest van Lynden (Linde) is mentioned in the year 1307 ("Uradel"). The family takes its name from the village Lienden in the Dutch province of Gelderland. Members carry the title of baron or count.

== Notable members ==
- Constantijn Theodoor van Lynden van Sandenburg, Prime Minister of the Netherlands.
- Harold Charles comte d'Aspremont Lynden of Belgium

== Heraldry ==
This coat of arms is depicted in the medieval Gelre Armorial (folio 89v).

== Places related to the family ==
- Ter Lede Castle, Lienden
- Lyndenstein
- Lynden, Washington, named coincidentally, leading to a large number of Dutch immigrants in the early 20th century. To this day, the town hosts one of the largest concentrations of Dutch in the United States.
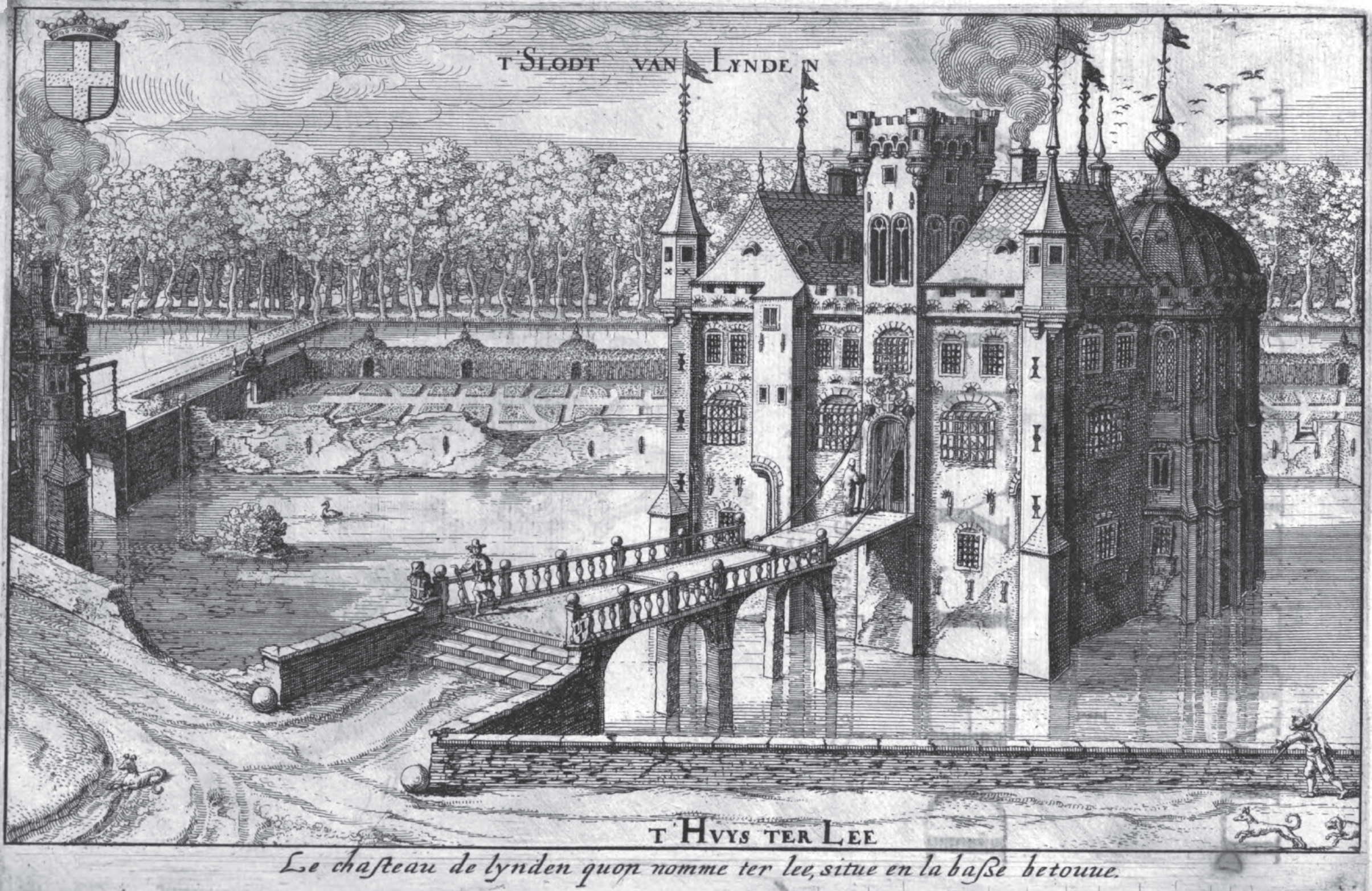
Ter Lede Castle, Lienden, Netherlands

== Literature ==
- 'Van Lynden', Nederland's Adelsboek 87 (1998), pp. 547–649.
- Detlev Schwennicke, Europäische Stammtafeln Band XXVIII (2012) Tafel 81.
