= Willem Grobbée =

Dutch politician

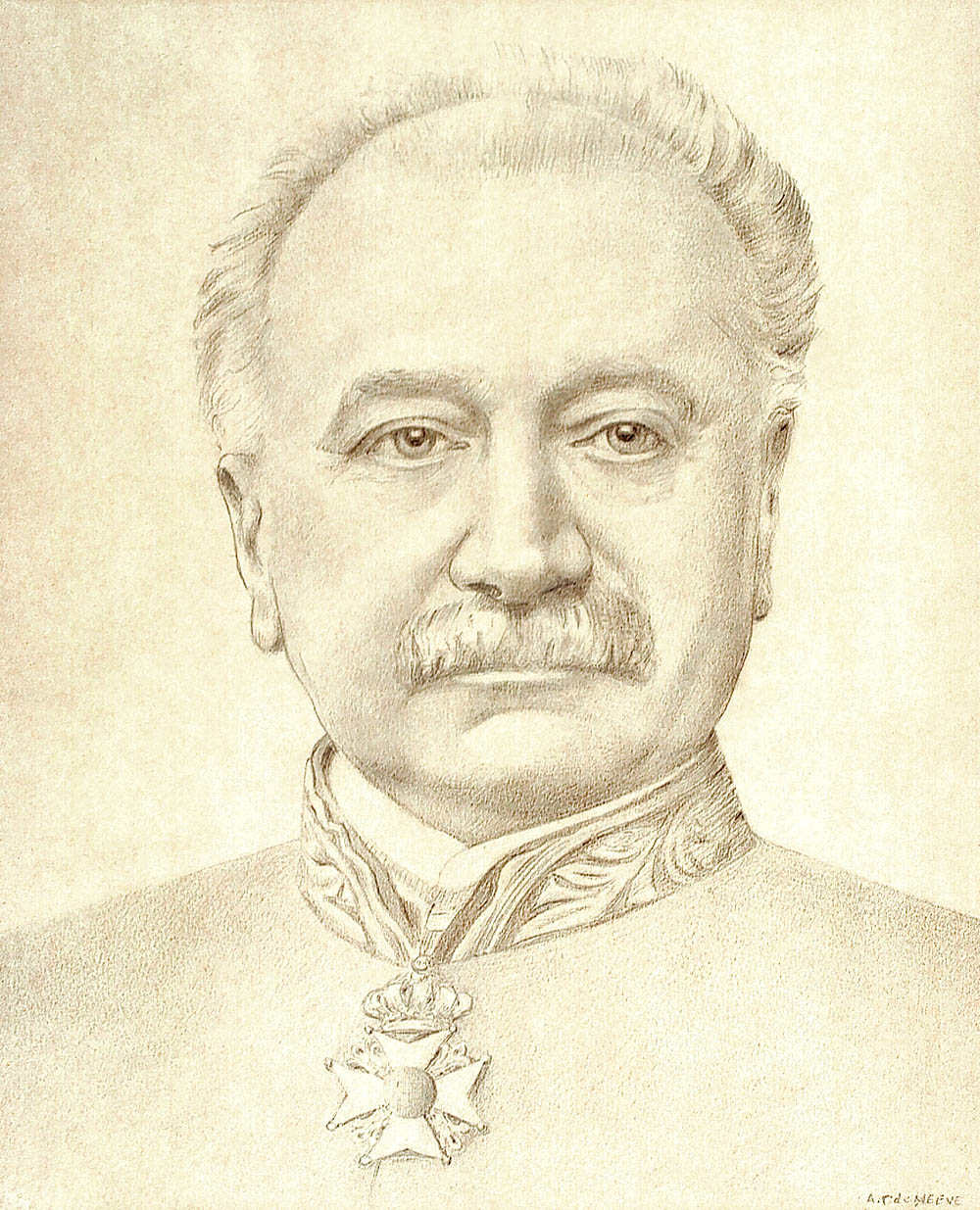
Willem Grobbée

Willem Johan Lucas Grobbée (9 April 1822, in Zwolle – 6 April 1907, in The Hague) was a Dutch politician.

Grobbée, who had been tax inspector, became Minister of Finance in the conservative cabinet of Jan Heemskerk in 1883. He was the 14th candidate for that function and turned out to be ineffective in that role. He resigned after two years when the House of Representatives had rejected his proposals for finance improvements, which, for the first time in Dutch history, included a form of income tax.
