= Willem Frederik Rochussen =

Dutch politician

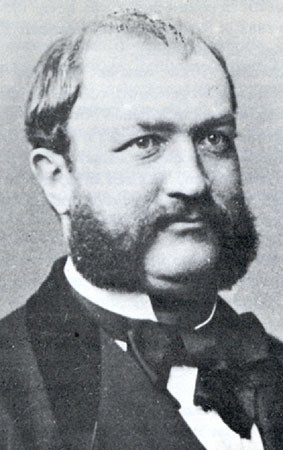
Willem Frederik Rochussen

Willem Frederik Rochussen (18 December 1832, Amsterdam – 17 July 1912, The Hague) was a Dutch politician. From 5 September 1881 until 23 April 1883 he was Minister of Foreign Affairs of the Netherlands.
