= August Willem Philip Weitzel =

Dutch military officer and politician

August Willem Philip Weitzel (The Hague, 6 January 1816 – 29 March 1896) was a military officer who served as Dutch Minister of War for two cabinets, as well as Minister of Colonies in the interim Kabinet-Heemskerk Azn. cabinet.

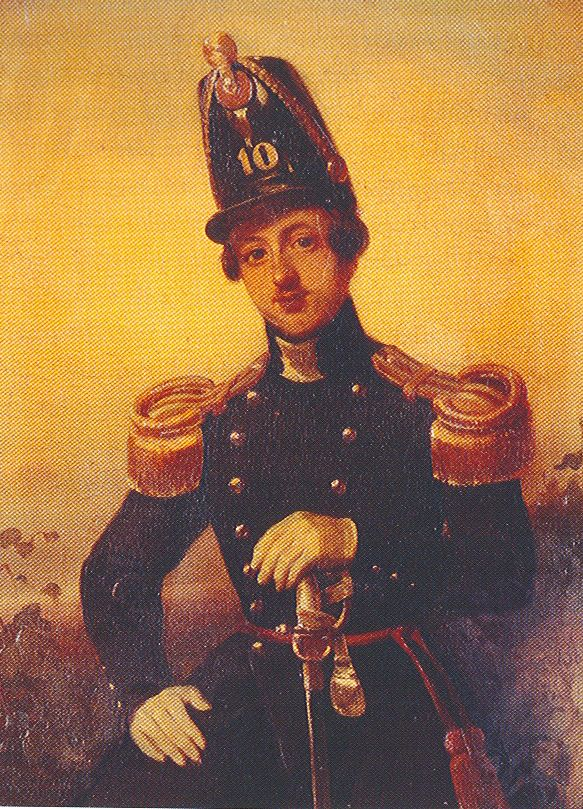
Luitenant Weitzel of the 10th Infantry Regiment in 1846

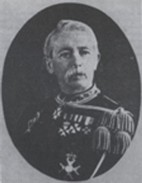
Weitzel ca 1890

== Literature ==
- "Merkwaardigheden uit mijn leven" was partially published under the title "Maar Majesteit!" in 1968

Political offices
Preceded by Franciscus Gerard van Bloemen Waanders	Minister of Colonial Affairs (interim); 1883-1884	Succeeded by Jacobus Petrus Sprenger van Eyk
