= Jan Heemskerk =

Dutch politician

His Excellency Jan Heemskerk
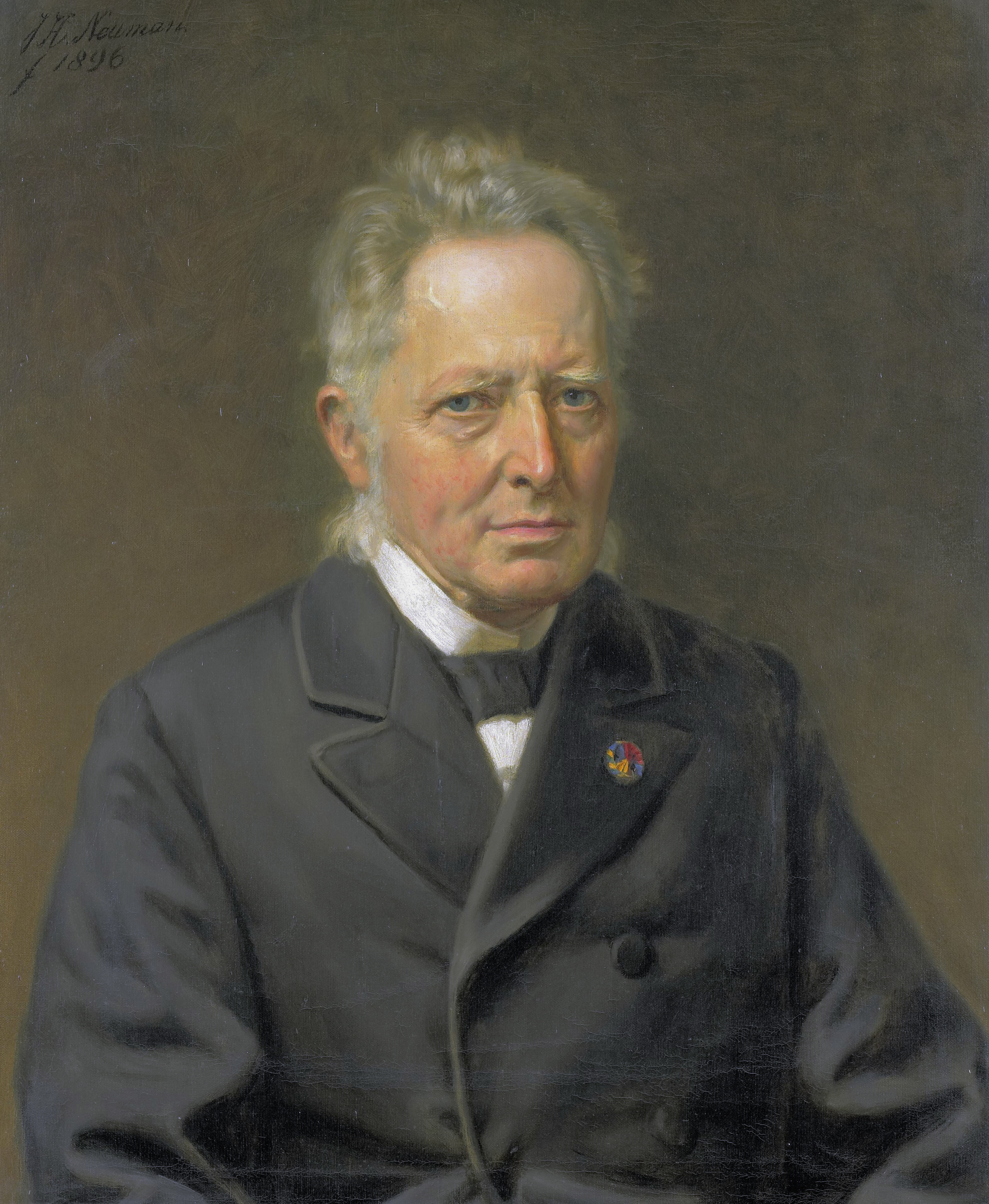
- Portrait by Johan Heinrich Neuman, 1896

Chairman of the Council of Ministers
- In office 23 April 1883 – 20 April 1888
- Monarch: William III
- Preceded by: Theo van Lynden van Sandenburg
- Succeeded by: Æneas, Baron Mackay
- In office 27 August 1874 – 3 November 1877
- Monarch: William III
- Preceded by: Gerrit de Vries
- Succeeded by: Jan Kappeyne van de Coppello

Personal details
- Born: Jan Heemskerk Abrahamszoon; 30 July 1818 Amsterdam, Netherlands
- Died: 9 October 1897 (aged 79) The Hague, Netherlands
- Spouse: Anna Maria
- Children: 8, including Theo Heemskerk
- Occupation: Lawyer

Jan Heemskerk Abrahamszoon (Dutch pronunciation: [jɑn ˈɦeːmskɛr(ə)k ˈaːbraːɦɑmˌsoːn]; 30 July 1818 – 9 October 1897) was a Dutch politician who served as Chairman of the Council of Ministers from 1874 to 1877, and again from 1883 to 1888. His son, Theo Heemskerk also served as Chairman of the Council of Ministers.

== Biography ==
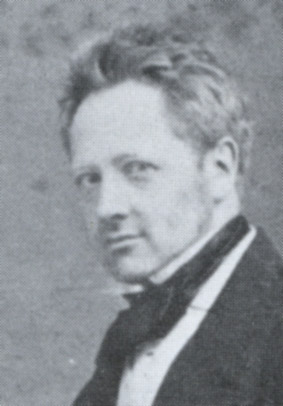
Jan Heemskerk c. 1860

Jan Heemskerk Abrahamszoon was born on 30 July 1818 in Amsterdam. He was the son of Abraham Heemskerk and Joanna Jacoba Stuart. He was baptized on 27 August 1818 in the Remonstrant Church in Amsterdam.

He studied law and became a lawyer, then a member of the House of Representatives. Originally a liberal politician, he became a conservative in 1866, and remained this in his Premiership.

He was three times Ministers of the Interior (1866–1868; 1874–1877; 1883–1888) and three times temporary chairman of the Council of Ministers, similar to the present-day Prime Minister, (1867–1868; 1874–1877; 1883–1888). He was Minister of State from 1885 to his death.

Heemskerk died on 9 October 1897, at the age of 79, in The Hague.

== Personal life ==
Heemskerk married his first cousin Anna Maria Heemskerk on 1 October 1846 in Utrecht. They had 5 sons, one of whom died in infancy, and 3 daughters. His son Theo Heemskerk (1852–1932) was Chairman of the Council of Ministers from 1908 to 1913. His son Jan Frederik Heemskerk (1867–1944) was a member of the House of Representatives.

== Published works ==
Heemskerk's published works include

- De praktijk onzer grondwet. 2 vols. (Utrecht: J. L. Beijers, 1881.)
- Speciminis inauguralis de Montesquivio pars prior [-altera]. 2 vols. (Amstelodami: J.H. et G. van Heteren, 1839.)

Political offices
Preceded by Johan Herman Geertsema	Minister of the Interior; 1866–1868	Succeeded by Cornelis Fock
Preceded by Johan Herman Geertsema	Minister of the Interior; 1874–1877	Succeeded by Willem Six
Preceded by Gerrit de Vries	Chairman of the Council of Ministers; 1874–1877	Succeeded by Jan Kappeyne van de Coppello
Preceded by Cornelis Pijnacker Hordijk	Minister of the Interior; 1883–1888	Succeeded by Æneas, Baron Mackay
Preceded by Theo van Lynden van Sandenburg	Chairman of the Council of Ministers; 1883–1888	Succeeded by Æneas, Baron Mackay
