= Tiel (electoral district) =

Dutch House of Representatives electoral district (1850-1918)

Tiel was an electoral district of the House of Representatives in the Netherlands from 1850 to 1918.

== Profile ==
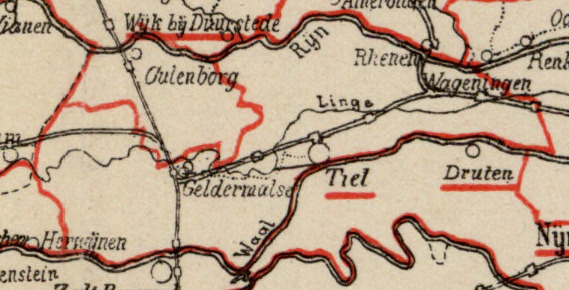
The district of Tiel in 1888

Tiel was created as a single-member district in 1850 out of parts of the provisional district of Zaltbommel, and a small part of the district of Elst, both of which were abolished. It comprised the far west of the province of Gelderland between the Meuse, Waal and Lek rivers, and was named after the town of Tiel. Throughout its existence, the district's boundaries routinely shifted, including in 1858 and in 1864. In 1869, it was turned into a larger two-seat district, encompassing towns such as Culemborg, Geldermalsen and Zaltbommel. Tiel ceded territory in the 1888 revision, which changed the district to a single-seat district, losing Culemborg again to the district of Wijk bij Duurstede, and Zaltbommel to Druten. It retained these boundaries until the district was abolished in 1918.

Tiel's population increased slightly from 22,458 in 1850 to 24,571 in 1864. After its 1969 enlargement, the district had a population of 45,954, which continued to grow steadily to 48,331 in 1909, despite losing territory again in 1888. Throughout its existence, a majority of the population of Tiel was aligned with the Dutch Reformed Church, ranging from 63% in 1850 to 83.5% in 1897. Most of the remainder of the population was Roman Catholic, ranging from 12% in 1909 to 34% in 1850.

The district of Tiel was abolished upon the introduction of party-list proportional representation in 1918.

== Members ==
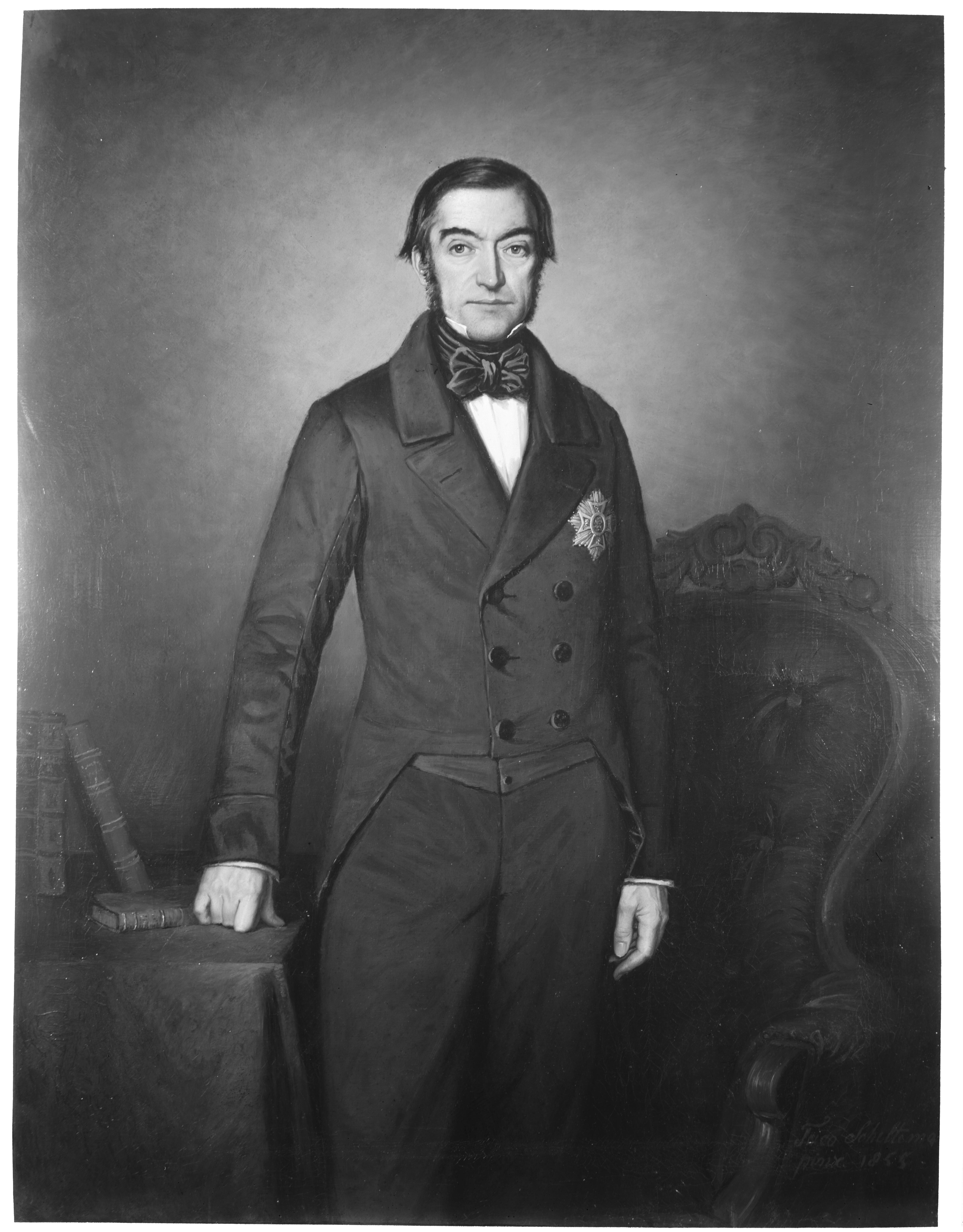
Jacob de Kempenaer

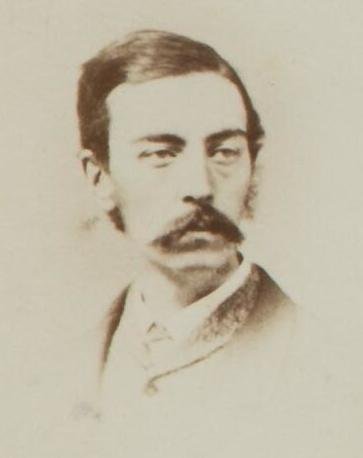
Donald Mackay

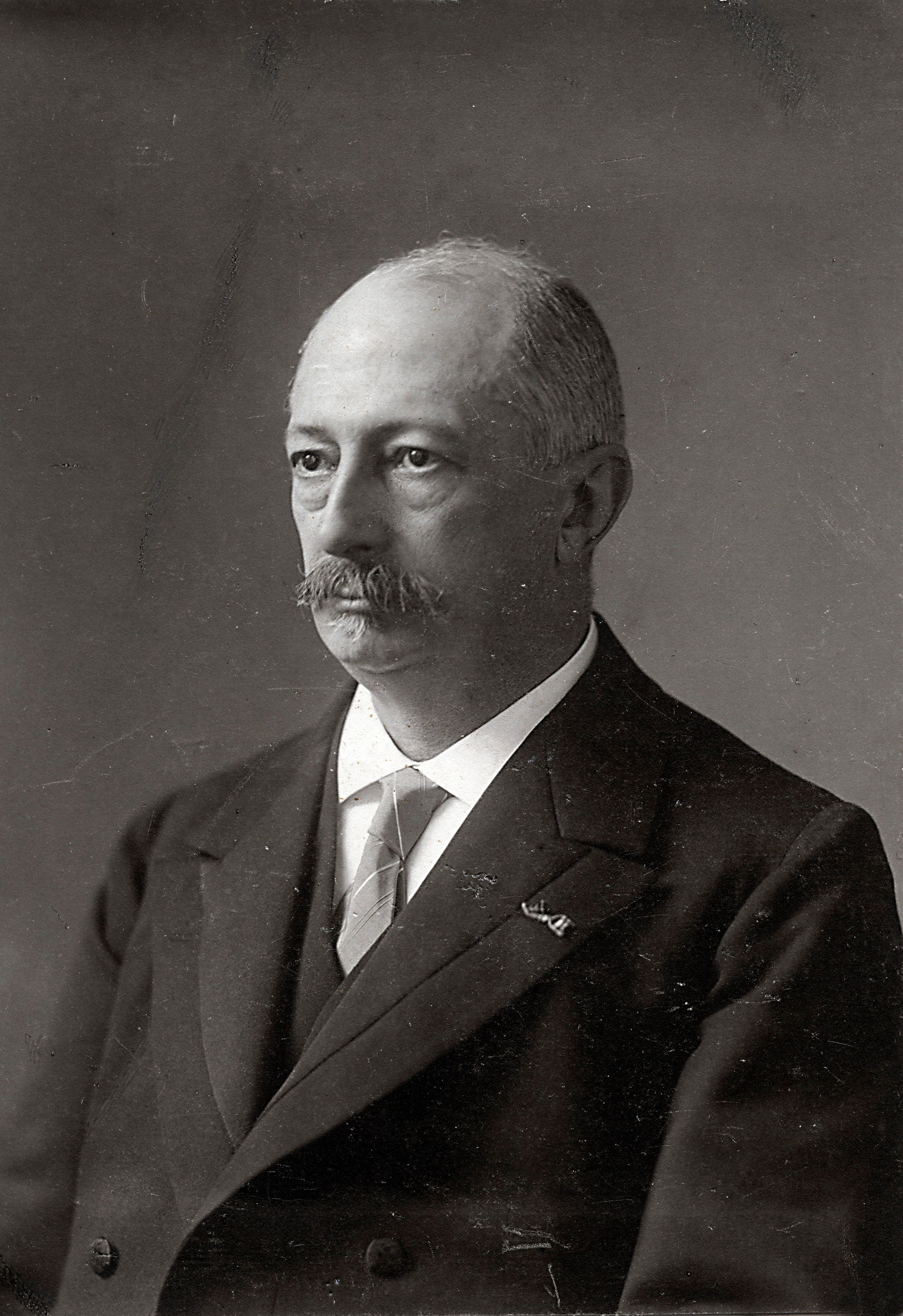
Map Tydeman Jr.

For most of its existence, Tiel was a contested district, electing liberals, conservatives and antirevolutionaries. It was represented by one member between 1850 and 1869, two between 1869 and 1888, and one again from 1888 until its abolition in 1918. Some of its prominent members include former chairman of the Council of Ministers Jacob de Kempenaer (1853–1860), former chairman Theo van Lynden van Sandenburg (1869–1874), Donald Mackay (1871–1877), who would later inherit a Scottish peerage and serve as governor of Bombay, and Gerard Beelaerts van Blokland (1883–1888). After its last boundary revision in 1888, Tiel consistently elected liberals until 1918, most prominently Map Tydeman Jr., who became the district's longest-serving representative, serving from 1891 until 1916.

Election	First member	Party	Second member	Party
1850	Edmond Willem van Dam van Isselt	Ind	One seat (1850-1869)	
1852	Edmond Willem van Dam van Isselt	Ind	One seat (1850-1869)	
1852	Jasper Andreas Adrianus Leemans	Ind	One seat (1850-1869)	
1853	Jacob de Kempenaer	Ind	One seat (1850-1869)	
1854	Jacob de Kempenaer	Ind	One seat (1850-1869)	
1858	Jacob de Kempenaer	Ind	One seat (1850-1869)	
1860	Willem Frederik Carel van Lidth de Jeude	Ind	One seat (1850-1869)	
1862	Willem Frederik Carel van Lidth de Jeude	Ind	One seat (1850-1869)	
1866	Willem Frederik Carel van Lidth de Jeude	Ind	One seat (1850-1869)	
1866	Willem Frederik Carel van Lidth de Jeude	Ind	One seat (1850-1869)	
1868	Willem Frederik Carel van Lidth de Jeude	Ind	One seat (1850-1869)	
1869 (Note: A periodic election and a by-election were held on the same day.)	Johannes Jerphaas Hasselman	Ind	Theo van Lynden van Sandenburg	Ind
1871	Johannes Jerphaas Hasselman	Ind	Donald Mackay	Ind
1871	Theo van Lynden van Sandenburg	Ind	Donald Mackay	Ind
1873	Theo van Lynden van Sandenburg	Ind	Donald Mackay	Ind
1874	Hendrik Anthon van Rappard	Ind	Donald Mackay	Ind
1875	Hendrik Anthon van Rappard	Ind	Donald Mackay	Ind
1876	Hendrik Anthon van Rappard	Ind	Donald Mackay	Ind
1877	Willem Hendrik de Beaufort	Ind	Donald Mackay	Ind
1877	Willem Hendrik de Beaufort	Ind	Herman Jacob Dijckmeester	Ind
1879	Willem Hendrik de Beaufort	Ind	Herman Jacob Dijckmeester	Ind
1881	Willem Hendrik de Beaufort	Ind	Herman Jacob Dijckmeester	Ind
1883	Gerard Beelaerts van Blokland	AR	Herman Jacob Dijckmeester	Ind
1884	Gerard Beelaerts van Blokland	AR	Frederik Willem Jacob van Aylva van Pallandt	AR
1886	Gerard Beelaerts van Blokland	AR	Frederik Willem Jacob van Aylva van Pallandt	AR
1887	Gerard Beelaerts van Blokland	AR	Frederik Willem Jacob van Aylva van Pallandt	AR
1888	Herman Jacob Dijckmeester	Lib	One seat (1888-1918)	
1891	Herman Jacob Dijckmeester	Lib	One seat (1888-1918)	
1891	Map Tydeman Jr.	Lib	One seat (1888-1918)	
1894	Map Tydeman Jr.	Lib	One seat (1888-1918)	
1897	Map Tydeman Jr.	VL	One seat (1888-1918)	
1901	Map Tydeman Jr.	VL	One seat (1888-1918)	
1905	Map Tydeman Jr.	VL	One seat (1888-1918)	
1909	Map Tydeman Jr.	VL	One seat (1888-1918)	
1913	Map Tydeman Jr.	VL	One seat (1888-1918)	
1916	Hendrik Coenraad Dresselhuys	VL	One seat (1888-1918)	
1917	Hendrik Coenraad Dresselhuys	VL	One seat (1888-1918)	

== Election results ==
=== Elections in the 1850s ===
1850 general election: Tiel
Candidate	Party	Votes	%
Edmond Willem van Dam van Isselt	Independent	538	51.48
W. R. van Hoëvell	Independent	470	44.98
Others		37	3.54
Total		1,045	100.00
Valid votes		1,045	98.58
Invalid/blank votes		15	1.42
Total votes		1,060	100.00
Registered voters/turnout		1,560	67.95
Independent gain			
Source: Electoral Council, Huygens Institute

1852 periodic election: Tiel
Candidate	Party	Votes	%
Edmond Willem van Dam van Isselt	Independent	645	83.23
Guillaume Groen van Prinsterer	Independent	26	3.35
N.F.C.J. Sassen	Independent	16	2.06
W. R. van Hoëvell	Independent	15	1.94
A. Schouten	Independent	15	1.94
Others		58	7.48
Total		775	100.00
Valid votes		775	99.10
Invalid/blank votes		7	0.90
Total votes		782	100.00
Registered voters/turnout		1,441	54.27
Independent hold			
Source: Electoral Council, Huygens Institute

1852 Tiel by-election
Candidate	Party	First round		Second round	
Candidate	Party	Votes	%	Votes	%
Jacob de Kempenaer	Independent	318	33.83	477	43.72
J.A.A. Leemans	Independent	277	29.47	614	56.28
Julius Constantijn Rijk	Independent	114	12.13		
Daniël Jan Steyn Parvé	Independent	108	11.49		
P.A. Reuchlin	Independent	74	7.87		
A.F.H. Hoffmann	Independent	19	2.02		
J. van den Andel	Independent	15	1.60		
Others		15	1.60		
Total		940	100.00	1,091	100.00
Valid votes		940	99.37	1,091	99.27
Invalid/blank votes		6	0.63	8	0.73
Total votes		946	100.00	1,099	100.00
Registered voters/turnout		1,441	65.65	1,441	76.27
Independent hold					
Source: Electoral Council, Huygens Institute

1853 general election: Tiel
Candidate	Party	Votes	%
Jacob de Kempenaer	Independent	721	65.72
J.A.A. Leemans	Independent	345	31.45
Others		31	2.83
Total		1,097	100.00
Valid votes		1,097	97.42
Invalid/blank votes		29	2.58
Total votes		1,126	100.00
Registered voters/turnout		1,404	80.20
Independent hold			
Source: Electoral Council, Huygens Institute

1854 periodic election: Tiel
Candidate	Party	Votes	%
Jacob de Kempenaer	Independent	662	74.80
Willem Hendrik	Independent	196	22.15
Others		27	3.05
Total		885	100.00
Valid votes		885	98.33
Invalid/blank votes		15	1.67
Total votes		900	100.00
Registered voters/turnout		1,404	64.10
Independent hold			
Source: Electoral Council, Huygens Institute

1858 periodic election: Tiel
Candidate	Party	Votes	%
Jacob de Kempenaer	Independent	539	57.28
B. van Merlen	Independent	318	33.79
P.A. Reuchlin	Independent	17	1.81
Others		67	7.12
Total		941	100.00
Valid votes		941	99.26
Invalid/blank votes		7	0.74
Total votes		948	100.00
Registered voters/turnout		1,454	65.20
Independent hold			
Source: Electoral Council, Huygens Institute

=== Elections in the 1860s ===
1860 Tiel by-election
Candidate	Party	Votes	%
W.F.C. van Lidt de Jeude	Independent	615	65.08
J.C.F. van Hoytema	Independent	218	23.07
Jacob van Lennep	Independent	62	6.56
H. Dijckmeester	Independent	24	2.54
Others		26	2.75
Total		945	100.00
Valid votes		945	99.68
Invalid/blank votes		3	0.32
Total votes		948	100.00
Registered voters/turnout		1,598	59.32
Independent hold			
Source: Electoral Council, Huygens Institute

1862 periodic election: Tiel
Candidate	Party	Votes	%
W.F.C. van Lidt de Jeude	Independent	539	77.89
J.C.F. van Hoytema	Independent	130	18.79
Others		23	3.32
Total		692	100.00
Valid votes		692	98.16
Invalid/blank votes		13	1.84
Total votes		705	100.00
Registered voters/turnout		1,634	43.15
Independent hold			
Source: Electoral Council, Huygens Institute

June 1866 periodic election: Tiel
Candidate	Party	Votes	%
W.F.C. van Lidt de Jeude	Independent	736	82.98
Johannes Jerphaas Hasselman	Independent	133	14.99
Others		18	2.03
Total		887	100.00
Valid votes		887	99.33
Invalid/blank votes		6	0.67
Total votes		893	100.00
Registered voters/turnout		1,627	54.89
Independent hold			
Source: Electoral Council, Huygens Institute

October 1866 general election: Tiel
Candidate	Party	Votes	%
W.F.C. van Lidt de Jeude	Independent	857	72.81
Ludolph Anne Jan Wilt Sloet van de Beele	Independent	177	15.04
Johannes Jerphaas Hasselman	Independent	86	7.31
Others		57	4.84
Total		1,177	100.00
Valid votes		1,177	99.92
Invalid/blank votes		1	0.08
Total votes		1,178	100.00
Registered voters/turnout		1,627	72.40
Independent hold			
Source: Electoral Council, Huygens Institute

1868 general election: Tiel
Candidate	Party	Votes	%
W.F.C. van Lidt de Jeude	Independent	691	68.08
A.A. Bleijenberg	Independent	176	17.34
Ludolph Anne Jan Wilt Sloet van de Beele	Independent	123	12.12
Others		25	2.46
Total		1,015	100.00
Valid votes		1,015	98.93
Invalid/blank votes		11	1.07
Total votes		1,026	100.00
Registered voters/turnout		1,680	61.07
Independent hold			
Source: Electoral Council, Huygens Institute

1869 periodic election: Tiel (second seat)
Candidate	Party	Votes	%
J.J. Hasselman	Independent	1,055	51.06
Willem Jan Knoop	Independent	759	36.74
James John Teding van Berkhout	Independent	119	5.76
Theo van Lynden van Sandenburg	Independent	75	3.63
Thomas Joannes Stieltjes	Independent	41	1.98
Others		17	0.82
Total		2,066	100.00
Valid votes		2,066	97.96
Invalid/blank votes		43	2.04
Total votes		2,109	100.00
Registered voters/turnout		2,840	74.26
Independent hold			
Source: Electoral Council, Huygens Institute

1869 Tiel by-election (first seat)
Candidate	Party	Votes	%
Theo van Lynden van Sandenburg	Independent	1,052	50.99
Thomas Joannes Stieltjes	Independent	873	42.32
J.J. Hasselman	Independent	80	3.88
Willem Jan Knoop	Independent	32	1.55
Others		26	1.26
Total		2,063	100.00
Valid votes		2,063	97.82
Invalid/blank votes		46	2.18
Total votes		2,109	100.00
Registered voters/turnout		2,840	74.26
Independent hold			
Source: Electoral Council, Huygens Institute

=== Elections in the 1870s ===
1871 periodic election: Tiel (second seat)
Candidate	Party	Votes	%
Donald Mackay	Independent	1,121	50.27
Theo van Lynden van Sandenburg	Independent	1,082	48.52
Others		27	1.21
Total		2,230	100.00
Valid votes		2,230	99.38
Invalid/blank votes		14	0.62
Total votes		2,244	100.00
Registered voters/turnout		2,910	77.11
Independent hold			
Source: Electoral Council, Huygens Institute

1871 Tiel by-election (first seat)
Candidate	Party	Votes	%
Theo van Lynden van Sandenburg	Independent	1,210	57.45
Ludolph Anne Jan Wilt Sloet van de Beele	Independent	896	42.55
Others			
Total		2,106	100.00
Registered voters/turnout		2,910	–
Independent hold			
Source: Electoral Council, Huygens Institute

1873 periodic election: Tiel (first seat)
Candidate	Party	Votes	%
Theo van Lynden van Sandenburg	Independent	1,331	64.99
L. Mulder	Independent	625	30.52
Others		92	4.49
Total		2,048	100.00
Valid votes		2,048	98.79
Invalid/blank votes		25	1.21
Total votes		2,073	100.00
Registered voters/turnout		2,896	71.58
Independent hold			
Source: Electoral Council, Huygens Institute

1874 Tiel by-election (first seat)
Candidate	Party	First round		Second round	
Candidate	Party	Votes	%	Votes	%
Hendrik Anthon van Rappard	Independent	820	46.25	1,238	54.78
Herman Jacob Dijckmeester	Independent	817	46.08	1,022	45.22
J. Wolbers	Independent	124	6.99		
Others		12	0.68		
Total		1,773	100.00	2,260	100.00
Valid votes		1,773	98.99	2,260	99.34
Invalid/blank votes		18	1.01	15	0.66
Total votes		1,791	100.00	2,275	100.00
Registered voters/turnout		2,934	61.04	2,934	77.54
Independent hold					
Source: Electoral Council, Huygens Institute

1875 periodic election: Tiel (second seat)
Candidate	Party	Votes	%
Donald Mackay	Independent	1,350	59.76
Jan Willem Gefken	AR	893	39.53
Others		16	0.71
Total		2,259	100.00
Valid votes		2,259	99.30
Invalid/blank votes		16	0.70
Total votes		2,275	100.00
Registered voters/turnout		2,988	76.14
Independent hold			
Source: Electoral Council, Huygens Institute

1876 Tiel by-election (first seat)
Candidate	Party	Votes	%
Hendrik Anthon van Rappard	Independent	1,056	96.26
Others		41	3.74
Total		1,097	100.00
Valid votes		1,097	90.21
Invalid/blank votes		119	9.79
Total votes		1,216	100.00
Registered voters/turnout		2,988	40.70
Independent hold			
Source: Electoral Council, Huygens Institute

1877 Tiel by-election (first seat)
Candidate	Party	Votes	%
Willem Hendrik de Beaufort	Independent	759	51.63
P.A.C.H.T.A. Werdmöller von Elgg	Independent	586	39.86
Willem van Goltstein	Independent	85	5.78
Others		40	2.72
Total		1,470	100.00
Valid votes		1,470	98.46
Invalid/blank votes		23	1.54
Total votes		1,493	100.00
Registered voters/turnout		3,108	48.04
Independent hold			
Source: Electoral Council, Huygens Institute

1877 periodic election: Tiel (second seat)
Candidate	Party	Votes	%
Herman Jacob Dijckmeester	Independent	1,001	50.66
Willem van Goltstein	Independent	604	30.57
Barthold Jacob Lintelo de Geer van Jutphaas	AR	367	18.57
Others		4	0.20
Total		1,976	100.00
Valid votes		1,976	98.85
Invalid/blank votes		23	1.15
Total votes		1,999	100.00
Registered voters/turnout		3,164	63.18
Independent hold			
Source: Electoral Council, Huygens Institute

1879 periodic election: Tiel (first seat)
Candidate	Party	Votes	%
Willem Hendrik de Beaufort	Independent	983	50.26
Gerard Beelaerts van Blokland	AR	962	49.18
Others		11	0.56
Total		1,956	100.00
Valid votes		1,956	98.29
Invalid/blank votes		34	1.71
Total votes		1,990	100.00
Registered voters/turnout		3,104	64.11
Independent hold			
Source: Electoral Council, Huygens Institute

=== Elections in the 1880s ===
1881 periodic election: Tiel (second seat)
Candidate	Party	Votes	%
Herman Jacob Dijckmeester	Independent	1,354	51.25
Gerard Beelaerts van Blokland	AR	1,274	48.22
Others		14	0.53
Total		2,642	100.00
Valid votes		2,642	99.06
Invalid/blank votes		25	0.94
Total votes		2,667	100.00
Registered voters/turnout		3,192	83.55
Independent hold			
Source: Electoral Council, Huygens Institute

1883 periodic election: Tiel (first seat)
Candidate	Party	Votes	%
Gerard Beelaerts van Blokland	AR	1,451	54.26
Willem Hendrik de Beaufort	Independent	1,223	45.74
Others			
Total		2,674	100.00
Valid votes		2,674	99.33
Invalid/blank votes		18	0.67
Total votes		2,692	100.00
Registered voters/turnout		3,230	83.34
Anti-revolutionary gain			
Source: Electoral Council, Huygens Institute

1884 general election: Tiel
Candidate	Party	Votes	%
Gerard Beelaerts van Blokland	AR	1,437	25.66
F.W.J. van Aylva baron van Pallandt	AR	1,429	25.51
Herman Jacob Dijckmeester	Independent	1,395	24.91
Cornelis Pijnacker Hordijk	Independent	1,337	23.87
Others		3	0.05
Total		5,601	100.00
Valid votes		5,601	99.13
Invalid/blank votes		49	0.87
Total votes		5,650	100.00
Registered voters/turnout		3,266	172.99
Anti-revolutionary hold			
Anti-Revolutionary gain			
Source: Electoral Council, Huygens Institute

1886 general election: Tiel
Candidate	Party	Votes	%
Gerard Beelaerts van Blokland	AR	1,609	25.50
F.W.J. van Aylva baron van Pallandt	AR	1,602	25.39
Herman Jacob Dijckmeester	Independent	1,567	24.84
Pieter Rink	Independent	1,521	24.11
Others		10	0.16
Total		6,309	100.00
Valid votes		6,309	98.98
Invalid/blank votes		65	1.02
Total votes		6,374	100.00
Registered voters/turnout		3,401	187.42
Anti-revolutionary hold			
Anti-Revolutionary hold			
Source: Electoral Council, Huygens Institute

1887 general election: Tiel
Candidate	Party	Votes	%
F.W.J. van Aylva baron van Pallandt	AR	1,606	29.32
Gerard Beelaerts van Blokland	AR	1,605	29.30
Pieter Rink	Independent	1,143	20.87
Map Tydeman Jr.	Independent	1,104	20.15
Others		20	0.37
Total		5,478	100.00
Valid votes		5,478	98.99
Invalid/blank votes		56	1.01
Total votes		5,534	100.00
Registered voters/turnout		3,377	163.87
Anti-Revolutionary hold			
Anti-revolutionary hold			
Source: Electoral Council, Huygens Institute

1888 general election: Tiel
Candidate	Party	Votes	%
Herman Jacob Dijckmeester	Lib	1,416	55.59
Gerard Beelaerts van Blokland	AR	1,131	44.41
Total		2,547	100.00
Valid votes		2,547	99.22
Invalid/blank votes		20	0.78
Total votes		2,567	100.00
Registered voters/turnout		2,874	89.32
Liberal gain			
Source: Electoral Council, Huygens Institute

=== Elections in the 1890s ===
1891 general election: Tiel
Candidate	Party	Votes	%
Herman Jacob Dijckmeester	Lib	1,354	58.39
M. Kolff	C	565	24.36
G.W. van Rechteren van Appeltern	AR	377	16.26
Others		23	0.99
Total		2,319	100.00
Valid votes		2,319	98.85
Invalid/blank votes		27	1.15
Total votes		2,346	100.00
Registered voters/turnout		2,894	81.06
Liberal hold			
Source: Electoral Council, Huygens Institute

1891 Tiel by-election
Candidate	Party	Votes	%
Map Tydeman Jr.	Lib	1,547	65.97
Æneas Mackay Jr.	AR	798	34.03
Total		2,345	100.00
Valid votes		2,345	99.83
Invalid/blank votes		4	0.17
Total votes		2,349	100.00
Registered voters/turnout		2,894	81.17
Liberal hold			
Source: Electoral Council, Huygens Institute (Note: The procès-verbal states the total number of valid votes as being 2,327, eighteen fewer than the sum of the candidates' votes.)

1894 general election: Tiel
Candidate	Party	Votes	%
Map Tydeman Jr.	Lib	1,054	84.19
Willem Hendrik de Beaufort (born 1845)	Lib	143	11.42
Willem Hendrik de Beaufort (born 1844)	Independent	32	2.56
Others		23	1.84
Total		1,252	100.00
Valid votes		1,252	95.94
Invalid/blank votes		53	4.06
Total votes		1,305	100.00
Registered voters/turnout		2,879	45.33
Liberal hold			
Source: Electoral Council, Huygens Institute

1897 general election: Tiel
Candidate	Party	Votes	%
Map Tydeman Jr.	VL	3,121	64.98
Frederik van Bylandt	VA	1,241	25.84
F. Mol	Rad	441	9.18
Total		4,803	100.00
Valid votes		4,803	98.26
Invalid/blank votes		85	1.74
Total votes		4,888	100.00
Registered voters/turnout		5,903	82.81
Free Liberal gain			
Source: Electoral Council, Huygens Institute

=== Elections in the 1900s ===
1901 general election: Tiel
Candidate	Party	Votes	%
Map Tydeman Jr.	VL	2,621	71.73
Theo Heemskerk	AR	1,033	28.27
Total		3,654	100.00
Valid votes		3,654	94.15
Invalid/blank votes		227	5.85
Total votes		3,881	100.00
Registered voters/turnout		5,639	68.82
Free Liberal hold			
Source: Electoral Council, Huygens Institute

1905 general election: Tiel
Candidate	Party	Votes	%
Map Tydeman Jr.	VL	2,666	60.66
Coenraad van der Voort van Zijp	AR	1,453	33.06
H.P. de Wilde	VD	276	6.28
Total		4,395	100.00
Valid votes		4,395	95.09
Invalid/blank votes		227	4.91
Total votes		4,622	100.00
Registered voters/turnout		5,935	77.88
Free Liberal hold			
Source: Electoral Council, Huygens Institute

1909 general election: Tiel
Candidate	Party	Votes	%
Map Tydeman Jr.	VL	2,634	61.95
H.C. Hogerzeil	AR	1,305	30.69
J.A. Bergmeyer	SDAP	313	7.36
Total		4,252	100.00
Valid votes		4,252	95.23
Invalid/blank votes		213	4.77
Total votes		4,465	100.00
Registered voters/turnout		6,267	71.25
Free Liberal hold			
Source: Electoral Council, Huygens Institute

=== Elections in the 1910s ===
1913 general election: Tiel
Candidate	Party	Votes	%
Map Tydeman Jr.	VL	3,279	56.22
Chris Smeenk	AR	1,600	27.43
Louis Hermans	SDAP	953	16.34
Total		5,832	100.00
Valid votes		5,832	98.61
Invalid/blank votes		82	1.39
Total votes		5,914	100.00
Registered voters/turnout		6,816	86.77
Free Liberal hold			
Source: Electoral Council, Huygens Institute

1916 Tiel by-election
Candidate	Party	Votes	%
Hendrik Coenraad Dresselhuys	VL	2,800	50.68
Johannes Beelaerts van Blokland	AR	1,604	29.03
Louis Hermans	SDAP	1,054	19.08
Anthon Gerrit Æmile van Rappard	VL	67	1.21
Total		5,525	100.00
Valid votes		5,525	98.56
Invalid/blank votes		81	1.44
Total votes		5,606	100.00
Registered voters/turnout		7,454	75.21
Free Liberal hold			
Source: Electoral Council, Huygens Institute

1917 general election: Tiel
Candidate	Party	Votes	%
Hendrik Coenraad Dresselhuys	VL		
Total			
Registered voters/turnout		7,640	–
Free Liberal hold			
Source: Electoral Council, Huygens Institute
