= Alkmaar (electoral district) =

Former electoral district in the Netherlands

Alkmaar was an electoral district of the House of Representatives in the Netherlands from 1848 to 1918.

== Profile ==
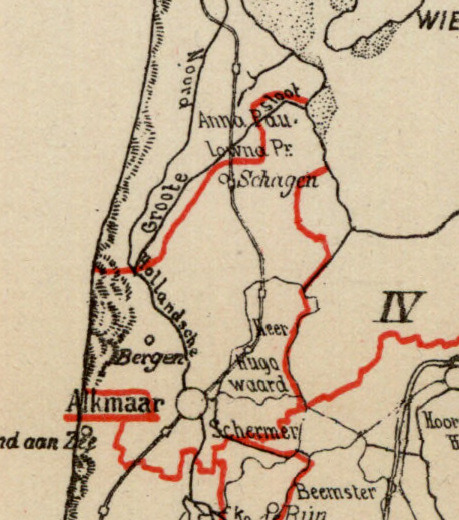
The district of Alkmaar in 1888

The electoral district of Alkmaar was centred around the city of Alkmaar in North Holland. After a brief period with provisional boundaries, the two-seat district created in 1850 stretched along much of the west coast of North Holland, from Den Helder and three Frisian Islands in the north to the North Sea Canal and Zaandam in the south. Minor boundary revisions in 1858, 1864, 1869 and 1878 transferred some municipalities in the south, including Zaandam in 1864, to the district of Haarlem, while it (re)gained some rural areas east of Alkmaar, some of which had been part of the district in the 1848–1850 period, at the expense of the Hoorn district. Alkmaar shrank considerably in the 1888 revision, which changed the district to a single-seat district, with most of its northern and southern areas ceded to the newly created districts of Den Helder and Beverwijk, respectively. It retained these boundaries until the district was abolished in 1918.

Through the district's existence, its population steadily increased from 44,163 in 1850 to 55,550 in 1909, despite losing territory in 1864 and 1888. From 1850 to 1888, a majority of around 60% the population was Reformed, with another 25 to 30% being Catholic. After the 1888 boundary revision, the share of Reformed Christians dropped gradually from 54.6% in 1888 to 47.6% in 1909, with Catholics, Gereformeerden and Others each increasing their share of the population.

The district of Alkmaar was abolished upon the introduction of party-list proportional representation in 1918.

== Members ==
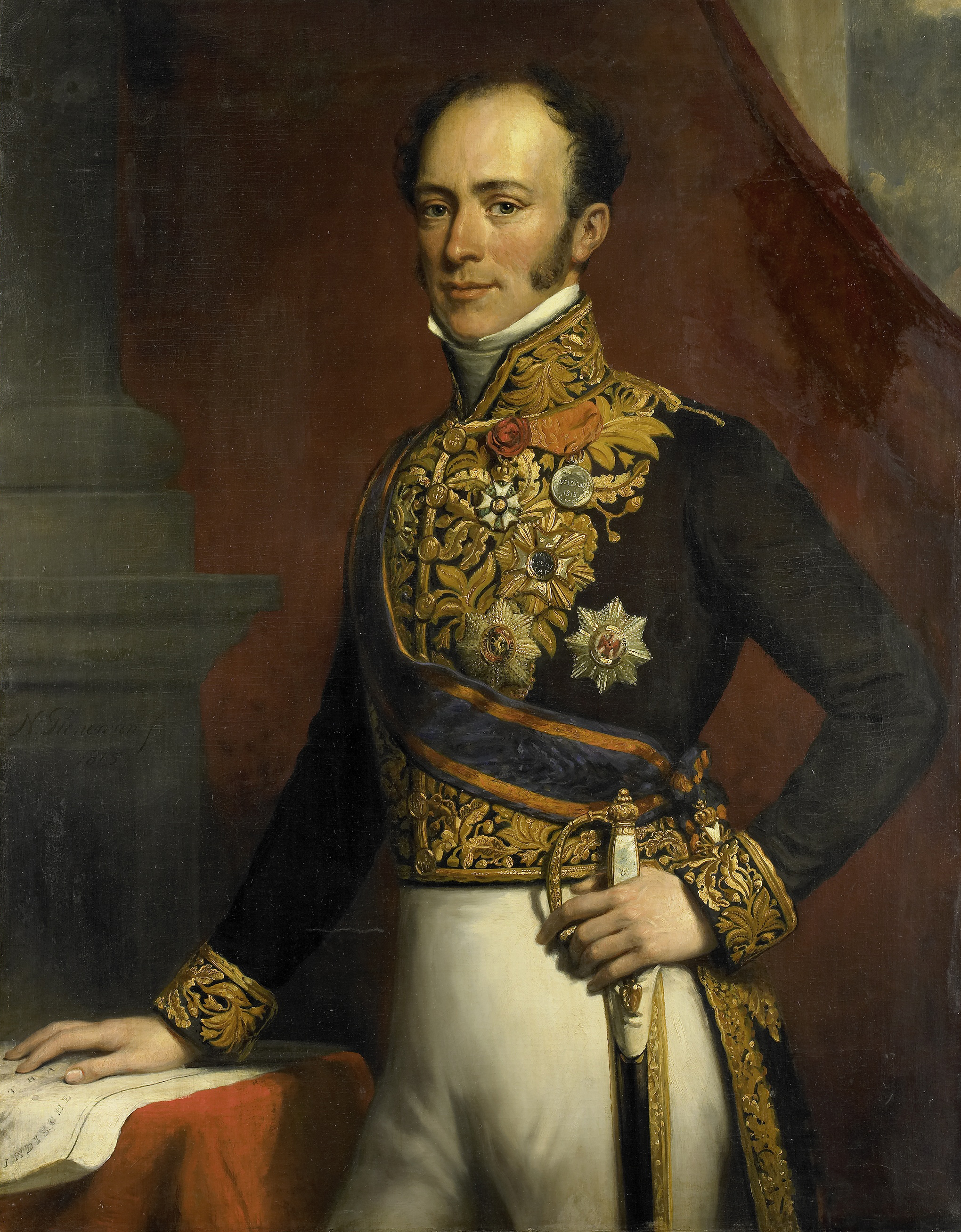
Jan Jacob Rochussen

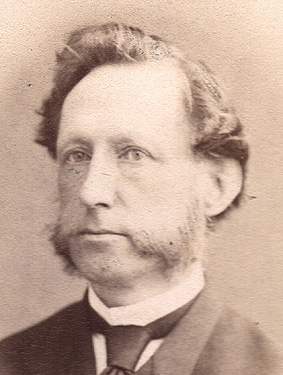
Jacob Leonard de Bruyn Kops

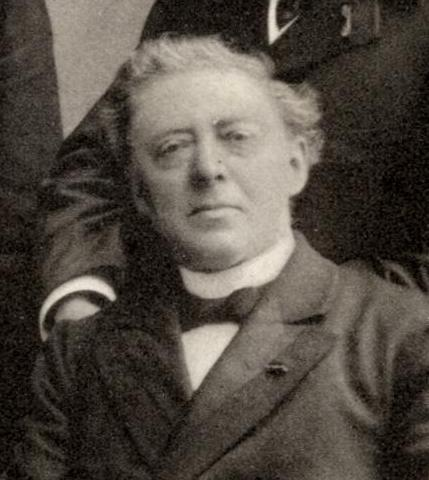
Willem van der Kaay

Alkmaar was a liberal safe seat throughout its existence. It was represented by one member between 1848 and 1850, two between 1850 and 1888, and one again from 1888 until its abolition in 1918. Some of its prominent members include later chairman of the Council of Ministers Jan Jacob Rochussen (1852–1857), Cornelis van Foreest (1853–1869) and his son Pieter van Foreest (1903–1918), Jacob Leonard de Bruyn Kops (1868–1887) and later minister of Justice Willem van der Kaay (1875–1894).

Election	First member	Party	Second member	Party
1848	Samuel Antony de Moraaz	Ind	One seat (1848-1850)	
1850	Samuel Antony de Moraaz	Ind	Hendrik Jan Smit	Ind
1852	Samuel Antony de Moraaz	Ind	Hendrik Jan Smit	Ind
1852	Samuel Antony de Moraaz	Ind	Jan Jacob Rochussen	Ind
1853	Cornelis van Foreest	Ind	Jan Jacob Rochussen	Ind
1854	Cornelis van Foreest	Ind	Jan Jacob Rochussen	Ind
1856	Cornelis van Foreest	Ind	Jan Jacob Rochussen	Ind
1857	Cornelis van Foreest	Ind	Karel Arnold Poortman	Ind
1858	Cornelis van Foreest	Ind	Karel Arnold Poortman	Ind
1860	Cornelis van Foreest	Ind	Karel Arnold Poortman	Ind
1862	Cornelis van Foreest	Ind	Karel Arnold Poortman	Ind
1864	Cornelis van Foreest	Ind	Karel Arnold Poortman	Ind
1866	Cornelis van Foreest	Ind	Nicolaas Olivier	Ind
1866	Cornelis van Foreest	Ind	Eduard Herman s' Jacob	Ind
1868	Cornelis van Foreest	Ind	Jacob Leonard de Bruyn Kops	Ind
1869	Willem Jan Knoop	Ind	Jacob Leonard de Bruyn Kops	Ind
1870	Cornelis van Foreest	Ind	Jacob Leonard de Bruyn Kops	Ind
1870	Cornelis van Foreest	Ind	Jacob Leonard de Bruyn Kops	Ind
1871	Cornelis van Foreest	Ind	Jacob Leonard de Bruyn Kops	Ind
1873	Cornelis van Foreest	Ind	Jacob Leonard de Bruyn Kops	Ind
1875	Willem van der Kaay	Ind	Jacob Leonard de Bruyn Kops	Ind
1875	Willem van der Kaay	Ind	Jacob Leonard de Bruyn Kops	Ind
1877	Willem van der Kaay	Ind	Jacob Leonard de Bruyn Kops	Ind
1877	Willem van der Kaay	Ind	Jacob Leonard de Bruyn Kops	Ind
1879	Willem van der Kaay	Ind	Jacob Leonard de Bruyn Kops	Ind
1881	Willem van der Kaay	Ind	Jacob Leonard de Bruyn Kops	Ind
1883	Willem van der Kaay	Ind	Jacob Leonard de Bruyn Kops	Ind
1884	Willem van der Kaay	Ind	Jacob Leonard de Bruyn Kops	Ind
1886	Willem van der Kaay	Ind	Jacob Leonard de Bruyn Kops	Ind
1887	Willem van der Kaay	Ind	Jacob Leonard de Bruyn Kops	Ind
1887	Willem van der Kaay	Ind	Isaäc Abraham Levy	Lib
1888	Willem van der Kaay	Lib	One seat (1888-1918)	
1891	Willem van der Kaay	Lib	One seat (1888-1918)	
1892	Willem van der Kaay	Lib	One seat (1888-1918)	
1894	Willem van der Kaay	Lib	One seat (1888-1918)	
1894	Adrianus Petrus de Lange	Lib	One seat (1888-1918)	
1897	Eduard Fokker	Lib	One seat (1888-1918)	
1897	Eduard Fokker	Lib	One seat (1888-1918)	
1901	Eduard Fokker	VD	One seat (1888-1918)	
1903	Pieter van Foreest	VL	One seat (1888-1918)	
1905	Pieter van Foreest	VL	One seat (1888-1918)	
1909	Pieter van Foreest	VL	One seat (1888-1918)	
1913	Pieter van Foreest	VL	One seat (1888-1918)	
1917	Pieter van Foreest	VL	One seat (1888-1918)	

== Election results ==
=== Elections in the 1840s ===
1848 general election: Alkmaar
Candidate	Party	Votes	%
Samuel Anthony Moraaz	Independent	503	52.84
Gerrit van Leeuwen	Independent	438	46.01
Others		11	1.16
Total		952	100.00
Valid votes		952	99.58
Invalid/blank votes		4	0.42
Total votes		956	100.00
Registered voters/turnout		1,107	86.36
Independent gain			
Source: Electoral Council, Huygens Institute

=== Elections in the 1850s ===
1850 general election: Alkmaar
Candidate	Party	Votes	%
Hendrik Jan Smit	Independent	1,566	39.93
Samuel Anthony Moraaz	Independent	1,275	32.51
Cornelis van Foreest	Independent	685	17.47
W.J.C. Waterschoot van der Gracht	Independent	255	6.50
Others		141	3.60
Total		3,922	100.00
Valid votes		3,922	99.49
Invalid/blank votes		20	0.51
Total votes		3,942	100.00
Registered voters/turnout		2,833	139.15
Independent gain			
Independent hold			
Source: Electoral Council, Huygens Institute

1852 periodic election: Alkmaar (second seat)
Candidate	Party	Votes	%
Hendrik Jan Smit	Independent	864	68.90
C. van de Stadt	Independent	170	13.56
Guillaume Groen van Prinsterer	Independent	80	6.38
Others		140	11.16
Total		1,254	100.00
Valid votes		1,254	100.00
Invalid/blank votes		0	0.00
Total votes		1,254	100.00
Registered voters/turnout		2,801	44.77
Independent hold			
Source: Electoral Council, Huygens Institute

1852 Alkmaar by-election (second seat)
Candidate	Party	Votes	%
Jan Jacob Rochussen	Independent	723	50.56
Eduard Borret	Independent	317	22.17
Clemens Sandenbergh Matthiessen	Independent	95	6.64
M. Salvador	Independent	54	3.78
J. Donker Hzn.	Independent	52	3.64
J.C. Rijk	Independent	41	2.87
mr. G.A. Fokker	Independent	31	2.17
Others		117	8.18
Total		1,430	100.00
Valid votes		1,430	99.79
Invalid/blank votes		3	0.21
Total votes		1,433	100.00
Registered voters/turnout		2,801	51.16
Independent hold			
Source: Electoral Council, Huygens Institute

1853 general election: Alkmaar
Candidate	Party	Votes	%
Jan Jacob Rochussen	Independent	1,506	38.65
Cornelis van Foreest	Independent	1,293	33.18
Samuel Anthony Moraaz	Independent	612	15.70
Johan Rudolph Thorbecke	Independent	412	10.57
Others		74	1.90
Total		3,897	100.00
Valid votes		3,897	99.72
Invalid/blank votes		11	0.28
Total votes		3,908	100.00
Registered voters/turnout		2,848	137.22
Independent hold			
Independent hold			
Source: Electoral Council, Huygens Institute

1854 periodic election: Alkmaar (second seat)
Candidate	Party	Votes	%
Jan Jacob Rochussen	Independent	889	73.84
Samuel Anthony Moraaz	Independent	280	23.26
Others		35	2.91
Total		1,204	100.00
Valid votes		1,204	99.26
Invalid/blank votes		9	0.74
Total votes		1,213	100.00
Registered voters/turnout		2,848	42.59
Independent hold			
Source: Electoral Council, Huygens Institute

1856 periodic election: Alkmaar (first seat)
Candidate	Party	First round		Second round	
Candidate	Party	Votes	%	Votes	%
Asser van Nierop	Independent	642	44.90	959	47.48
Cornelis van Foreest	Independent	625	43.71	1,061	52.52
Leonard Metman	Independent	122	8.53		
Others		41	2.87		
Total		1,430	100.00	2,020	100.00
Valid votes		1,430	99.51	2,020	99.61
Invalid/blank votes		7	0.49	8	0.39
Total votes		1,437	100.00	2,028	100.00
Registered voters/turnout		2,908	49.42	2,908	69.74
Independent hold					
Source: Electoral Council, Huygens Institute

1857 Alkmaar by-election (second seat)
Candidate	Party	First round		Second round	
Candidate	Party	Votes	%	Votes	%
Rutger Jan Schimmelpenninck van Nijenhuis	Independent	606	45.87	845	48.76
Karel Arnold Poortman	Independent	370	28.01	888	51.24
Leonard Metman	Independent	236	17.87		
Floris Adriaan van Hall	Independent	86	6.51		
Others		23	1.74		
Total		1,321	100.00	1,733	100.00
Valid votes		1,321	99.77	1,733	99.65
Invalid/blank votes		3	0.23	6	0.35
Total votes		1,324	100.00	1,739	100.00
Registered voters/turnout		2,908	45.53	2,908	59.80
Independent hold					
Source: Electoral Council, Huygens Institute

1858 periodic election: Alkmaar (second seat)
Candidate	Party	Votes	%
Karel Arnold Poortman	Independent	700	65.06
Frederik van Rappard	Independent	318	29.55
F. Sieuwerts	Independent	31	2.88
Others		27	2.51
Total		1,076	100.00
Valid votes		1,076	99.35
Invalid/blank votes		7	0.65
Total votes		1,083	100.00
Registered voters/turnout		2,962	36.56
Independent hold			
Source: Electoral Council, Huygens Institute

=== Elections in the 1860s ===
1860 periodic election: Alkmaar (first seat)
Candidate	Party	First round		Second round	
Candidate	Party	Votes	%	Votes	%
Cornelis van Foreest	Independent	525	48.12	862	55.79
Pieter Blussé van Oud-Alblas	Independent	507	46.47	683	44.21
J.L. Kikkert	Independent	45	4.12		
Others		14	1.28		
Total		1,091	100.00	1,545	100.00
Valid votes		1,091	99.54	1,545	99.68
Invalid/blank votes		5	0.46	5	0.32
Total votes		1,096	100.00	1,550	100.00
Registered voters/turnout		2,871	38.17	2,871	53.99
Independent hold					
Source: Electoral Council, Huygens Institute

1862 periodic election: Alkmaar (second seat)
Candidate	Party	Votes	%
Karel Arnold Poortman	Independent	606	51.75
Jan Jacob Rochussen	Independent	288	24.59
J.L. Kikkert	Independent	251	21.43
Others		26	2.22
Total		1,171	100.00
Valid votes		1,171	99.83
Invalid/blank votes		2	0.17
Total votes		1,173	100.00
Registered voters/turnout		3,138	37.38
Independent hold			
Source: Electoral Council, Huygens Institute

1864 periodic election: Alkmaar (first seat)
Candidate	Party	Votes	%
Cornelis van Foreest	Independent	643	52.58
Michiel Johan de Lange	Independent	249	20.36
J.L. Kikkert	Independent	188	15.37
R.C. Sloos	Independent	80	6.54
Others		63	5.15
Total		1,223	100.00
Valid votes		1,223	99.43
Invalid/blank votes		7	0.57
Total votes		1,230	100.00
Registered voters/turnout		2,969	41.43
Independent hold			
Source: Electoral Council, Huygens Institute

June 1866 periodic election: Alkmaar (second seat)
Candidate	Party	Votes	%
Nicolaas Olivier	Independent	593	53.09
J.D. van Herwerden	Independent	446	39.93
Others		78	6.98
Total		1,117	100.00
Valid votes		1,117	99.64
Invalid/blank votes		4	0.36
Total votes		1,121	100.00
Registered voters/turnout		3,036	36.92
Independent hold			
Source: Electoral Council, Huygens Institute

October 1866 general election: Alkmaar
Candidate	Party	Votes	%
Cornelis van Foreest	Independent	1,387	30.84
Eduard Herman s' Jacob	Independent	1,204	26.77
Willem van der Kaay	Independent	996	22.14
Nicolaas Olivier	Independent	847	18.83
Others		64	1.42
Total		4,498	100.00
Valid votes		4,498	99.43
Invalid/blank votes		26	0.57
Total votes		4,524	100.00
Registered voters/turnout		3,036	149.01
Independent hold			
Independent hold			
Source: Electoral Council, Huygens Institute

1868 general election: Alkmaar
Candidate	Party	First round		Second round	
Candidate	Party	Votes	%	Votes	%
Jacob Leonard de Bruyn Kops	Independent	1,060	25.70		
Cornelis van Foreest	Independent	998	24.19	1,444	57.85
Willem van der Kaay	Independent	994	24.10	1,052	42.15
Eduard Herman s' Jacob	Independent	930	22.55		
Nicolaas Olivier	Independent	104	2.52		
Others		39	0.95		
Total		4,125	100.00	2,496	100.00
Valid votes		4,125	99.73	2,496	99.68
Invalid/blank votes		11	0.27	8	0.32
Total votes		4,136	100.00	2,504	100.00
Registered voters/turnout		3,232	127.97	3,232	77.48
Independent hold					
Independent hold					
Source: Electoral Council, Huygens Institute

1869 periodic election: Alkmaar (first seat)
Candidate	Party	Votes	%
Willem Jan Knoop	Independent	1,212	52.17
Cornelis van Foreest	Independent	1,106	47.61
Others		5	0.22
Total		2,323	100.00
Valid votes		2,323	99.87
Invalid/blank votes		3	0.13
Total votes		2,326	100.00
Registered voters/turnout		3,051	76.24
Independent hold			
Source: Electoral Council, Huygens Institute

=== Elections in the 1870s ===
August 1870 Alkmaar by-election (first seat)
Candidate	Party	First round		Second round	
Candidate	Party	Votes	%	Votes	%
Cornelis van Foreest	Independent	878	49.89	1,191	51.09
Willem Jan Knoop	Independent	878	49.89	1,140	48.91
Others		4	0.23		
Total		1,760	100.00	2,331	100.00
Valid votes		1,760	99.66	2,331	99.70
Invalid/blank votes		6	0.34	7	0.30
Total votes		1,766	100.00	2,338	100.00
Registered voters/turnout		3,154	55.99	3,154	74.13
Independent hold					
Source: Electoral Council, Huygens Institute

October 1870 Alkmaar by-election (first seat)
Candidate	Party	Votes	%
Cornelis van Foreest	Independent	1,083	53.85
H.G.C.L. Janssens	Independent	914	45.45
Others		14	0.70
Total		2,011	100.00
Valid votes		2,011	99.65
Invalid/blank votes		7	0.35
Total votes		2,018	100.00
Registered voters/turnout		3,154	63.98
Independent hold			
Source: Electoral Council, Huygens Institute

1871 periodic election: Alkmaar (second seat)
Candidate	Party	Votes	%
Jacob Leonard de Bruyn Kops	Independent	1,254	55.81
Rutger Jan Schimmelpenninck van Nijenhuis	Independent	978	43.52
Others		15	0.67
Total		2,247	100.00
Valid votes		2,247	99.73
Invalid/blank votes		6	0.27
Total votes		2,253	100.00
Registered voters/turnout		3,215	70.08
Independent hold			
Source: Electoral Council, Huygens Institute

1873 periodic election: Alkmaar (first seat)
Candidate	Party	Votes	%
Cornelis van Foreest	Independent	1,270	51.56
Willem van der Kaay	Independent	1,162	47.18
Others		31	1.26
Total		2,463	100.00
Valid votes		2,463	99.88
Invalid/blank votes		3	0.12
Total votes		2,466	100.00
Registered voters/turnout		3,330	74.05
Independent hold			
Source: Electoral Council, Huygens Institute

1875 Alkmaar by-election (first seat)
Candidate	Party	Votes	%
Willem van der Kaay	Independent	1,718	61.82
D.C.A. van Hogendorp	Independent	865	31.13
B.J.L. van Geer van Jutphaas	Independent	169	6.08
Others		27	0.97
Total		2,779	100.00
Valid votes		2,779	99.86
Invalid/blank votes		4	0.14
Total votes		2,783	100.00
Registered voters/turnout		3,514	79.20
Independent hold			
Source: Electoral Council, Huygens Institute

1875 periodic election: Alkmaar (second seat)
Candidate	Party	Votes	%
Jacob Leonard de Bruyn Kops	Independent	1,729	61.95
François de Casembroot	Independent	862	30.88
Alexander de Savornin Lohman	AR	168	6.02
Others		32	1.15
Total		2,791	100.00
Valid votes		2,791	99.89
Invalid/blank votes		3	0.11
Total votes		2,794	100.00
Registered voters/turnout		3,514	79.51
Independent hold			
Source: Electoral Council, Huygens Institute

1877 periodic election: Alkmaar (first seat)
Candidate	Party	Votes	%
Willem van der Kaay	Independent	1,612	76.33
Gerhardus Fabius	Independent	414	19.60
Anthony Brummelkamp	AR	76	3.60
Others		10	0.47
Total		2,112	100.00
Valid votes		2,112	99.58
Invalid/blank votes		9	0.42
Total votes		2,121	100.00
Registered voters/turnout		3,734	56.80
Declared invalid			
Source: Electoral Council, Huygens Institute

1877 Alkmaar by-election (first seat)
Candidate	Party	Votes	%
Willem van der Kaay	Independent	1,639	95.18
Anthony Brummelkamp	AR	69	4.01
Others		14	0.81
Total		1,722	100.00
Valid votes		1,722	97.29
Invalid/blank votes		48	2.71
Total votes		1,770	100.00
Registered voters/turnout		3,734	47.40
Independent hold			
Source: Electoral Council, Huygens Institute

1879 periodic election: Alkmaar (second seat)
Candidate	Party	Votes	%
Jacob Leonard de Bruyn Kops	Independent	1,157	57.73
Jan Heemskerk	Independent	759	37.87
H.W. van Marle	AR	79	3.94
Others		9	0.45
Total		2,004	100.00
Valid votes		2,004	99.65
Invalid/blank votes		7	0.35
Total votes		2,011	100.00
Registered voters/turnout		3,940	51.04
Independent hold			
Source: Electoral Council, Huygens Institute

=== Elections in the 1880s ===
1881 periodic election: Alkmaar (first seat)
Candidate	Party	Votes	%
Willem van der Kaay	Independent	1,305	61.01
W. Bos	Independent	630	29.45
Schelto van Heemstra	AR	192	8.98
Others		12	0.56
Total		2,139	100.00
Valid votes		2,139	99.67
Invalid/blank votes		7	0.33
Total votes		2,146	100.00
Registered voters/turnout		4,080	52.60
Independent hold			
Source: Electoral Council, Huygens Institute

1883 periodic election: Alkmaar (second seat)
Candidate	Party	Votes	%
Jacob Leonard de Bruyn Kops	Independent	1,336	57.29
W. Bos	Independent	644	27.62
Alexander de Savornin Lohman	AR	332	14.24
Others		20	0.86
Total		2,332	100.00
Valid votes		2,332	99.40
Invalid/blank votes		14	0.60
Total votes		2,346	100.00
Registered voters/turnout		4,021	58.34
Independent hold			
Source: Electoral Council, Huygens Institute

1884 general election: Alkmaar
Candidate	Party	First round		Second round	
Candidate	Party	Votes	%	Votes	%
Willem van der Kaay	Independent	1,568	29.50		
Jacob Leonard de Bruyn Kops	Independent	1,167	21.95	1,917	63.56
W. Bos	Independent	788	14.82	1,099	36.44
Jacobus Travaglino	Independent	755	14.20		
Willem Hendrik de Beaufort	Independent	410	7.71		
Alexander de Savornin Lohman	AR	293	5.51		
B.J.L. van Geer van Jutphaas	AR	279	5.25		
Others		56	1.05		
Total		5,316	100.00	3,016	100.00
Valid votes		5,316	99.55	3,016	99.57
Invalid/blank votes		24	0.45	13	0.43
Total votes		5,340	100.00	3,029	100.00
Registered voters/turnout		4,034	132.37	4,034	75.09
Independent hold					
Independent hold					
Source: Electoral Council, Huygens Institute

1886 general election: Alkmaar
Candidate	Party	Votes	%
Willem van der Kaay	Independent	1,938	29.55
Jacob Leonard de Bruyn Kops	Independent	1,898	28.94
Cornelis Hartsen	Independent	1,361	20.75
H.W. van Marle	AR	1,321	20.14
Others		41	0.63
Total		6,559	100.00
Valid votes		6,559	99.77
Invalid/blank votes		15	0.23
Total votes		6,574	100.00
Registered voters/turnout		4,243	154.94
Independent hold			
Independent hold			
Source: Electoral Council, Huygens Institute

1887 general election: Alkmaar
Candidate	Party	Votes	%
Willem van der Kaay	Independent	1,356	37.71
Jacob Leonard de Bruyn Kops	Independent	1,348	37.49
Theo Heemskerk	AR	293	8.15
H.W. van Marle	AR	281	7.81
W. Bos	Independent	194	5.39
Others		124	3.45
Total		3,596	100.00
Valid votes		3,596	98.04
Invalid/blank votes		72	1.96
Total votes		3,668	100.00
Registered voters/turnout		4,165	88.07
Independent hold			
Independent hold			
Source: Electoral Council, Huygens Institute

1887 Alkmaar by-election (second seat)
Candidate	Party	Votes	%
Isaäc Abraham Levy	Lib	1,306	56.46
Cornelis Hartsen	Independent	988	42.72
Others		19	0.82
Total		2,313	100.00
Valid votes		2,313	99.70
Invalid/blank votes		7	0.30
Total votes		2,320	100.00
Registered voters/turnout		4,165	55.70
Liberal gain			
Source: Electoral Council Huygens Institute

1888 general election: Alkmaar
Candidate	Party	First round		Second round	
Candidate	Party	Votes	%	Votes	%
Cornelis Hartsen	C	1,492	34.52	1,901	43.49
Willem van der Kaay	Lib	1,490	34.47	2,470	56.51
Isaäc Abraham Levy	Independent	954	22.07		
H.W. van Marle	AR	255	5.90		
W.F. Stoel	Rad	128	2.96		
Others		3	0.07		
Total		4,322	100.00	4,371	100.00
Valid votes		4,322	99.98	4,371	99.86
Invalid/blank votes		1	0.02	6	0.14
Total votes		4,323	100.00	4,377	100.00
Registered voters/turnout		4,797	90.12	4,797	91.24
Liberal hold					
Source: Electoral Council, Huygens Institute

=== Elections in the 1890s ===
1891 general election: Alkmaar
Candidate	Party	First round		Second round	
Candidate	Party	Votes	%	Votes	%
Willem van der Kaay	Lib	1,636	48.05	2,479	59.04
A. Goede	Ka	1,313	38.56	1,720	40.96
Carel Victor Gerritsen	Rad	453	13.30		
Others		3	0.09		
Total		3,405	100.00	4,199	100.00
Valid votes		3,405	99.65	4,199	99.41
Invalid/blank votes		12	0.35	25	0.59
Total votes		3,417	100.00	4,224	100.00
Registered voters/turnout		4,783	71.44	4,783	88.31
Liberal hold					
Source: Electoral Council, Huygens Institute

1892 Alkmaar by-election
Candidate	Party	Votes	%
Willem van der Kaay	Lib	1,283	97.05
Others		39	2.95
Total		1,322	100.00
Valid votes		1,322	94.70
Invalid/blank votes		74	5.30
Total votes		1,396	100.00
Registered voters/turnout		4,783	29.19
Liberal hold			
Source: Electoral Council, Huygens Institute

1894 general election: Alkmaar
Candidate	Party	First round		Second round	
Candidate	Party	Votes	%	Votes	%
Willem van der Kaay	Lib	1,427	45.53	2,291	59.85
Willem Treub	Rad	1,205	38.45	1,537	40.15
Jan van Gilse	Lib	483	15.41		
Others		19	0.61		
Total		3,134	100.00	3,828	100.00
Valid votes		3,134	99.27	3,828	99.58
Invalid/blank votes		23	0.73	16	0.42
Total votes		3,157	100.00	3,844	100.00
Registered voters/turnout		4,760	66.32	4,760	80.76
Liberal hold					
Source: Electoral Council, Huygens Institute

1894 Alkmaar by-election
Candidate	Party	Votes	%
Adrianus Petrus de Lange	Lib	1,961	63.28
Hendrik Jan Smidt	Lib	1,075	34.69
J.P. Kraakman		48	1.55
Others		15	0.48
Total		3,099	100.00
Valid votes		3,099	99.33
Invalid/blank votes		21	0.67
Total votes		3,120	100.00
Registered voters/turnout		4,779	65.29
Liberal hold			
Source: Electoral Council, Huygens Institute

1897 Alkmaar by-election
Candidate	Party	Votes	%
Eduard Fokker	Lib	853	50.68
Willem van der Kaay	Lib	802	47.65
Others		28	1.66
Total		1,683	100.00
Valid votes		1,683	98.02
Invalid/blank votes		34	1.98
Total votes		1,717	100.00
Registered voters/turnout		4,865	35.29
Liberal hold			
Source: Electoral Council, Huygens Institute

1897 general election: Alkmaar
Candidate	Party	First round		Second round	
Candidate	Party	Votes	%	Votes	%
Titus van Asch van Wijck	AR	2,719	42.45	2,830	42.72
Eduard Fokker	Lib	2,158	33.69	3,795	57.28
Willem van der Kaay	VL	1,413	22.06		
J.G. van Kuykhof	SDAP	115	1.80		
Total		6,405	100.00	6,625	100.00
Valid votes		6,405	99.09	6,625	99.34
Invalid/blank votes		59	0.91	44	0.66
Total votes		6,464	100.00	6,669	100.00
Registered voters/turnout		7,236	89.33	7,236	92.16
Liberal hold					
Source: Electoral Council, Huygens Institute

=== Elections in the 1900s ===
1901 general election: Alkmaar
Candidate	Party	First round		Second round	
Candidate	Party	Votes	%	Votes	%
Eduard Fokker	VD	2,590	42.23	3,888	57.18
Nicolaas Oosterbaan	AR	2,175	35.46	2,911	42.82
W.C. Bosman	Lib	941	15.34		
J.G. van Kuykhof	SDAP	427	6.96		
Total		6,133	100.00	6,799	100.00
Valid votes		6,133	98.35	6,799	99.17
Invalid/blank votes		103	1.65	57	0.83
Total votes		6,236	100.00	6,856	100.00
Registered voters/turnout		7,824	79.70	7,824	87.63
Free-thinking Democratic gain					
Source: Electoral Council, Huygens Institute

1903 Alkmaar by-election
Candidate	Party	First round		Second round	
Candidate	Party	Votes	%	Votes	%
G.J. Sybrandy	AR	2,645	40.12	2,995	44.96
Pieter van Foreest	VL	1,706	25.88	3,666	55.04
C.A. Zelvelder	VD	1,585	24.04		
J.G. van Kuykhof	SDAP	656	9.95		
Total		6,592	100.00	6,661	100.00
Valid votes		6,592	98.46	6,661	99.11
Invalid/blank votes		103	1.54	60	0.89
Total votes		6,695	100.00	6,721	100.00
Registered voters/turnout		7,824	85.57	8,414	79.88
Free Liberal gain					
Source: Electoral Council, Huygens Institute

1905 general election: Alkmaar
Candidate	Party	First round		Second round	
Candidate	Party	Votes	%	Votes	%
Johan Heinrich Blum	AR	3,420	39.93	3,509	40.41
Pieter van Foreest	VL	3,275	38.24	5,174	59.59
F.C.J. Netscher	VD	1,509	17.62		
Maup Mendels	SDAP	360	4.20		
Total		8,564	100.00	8,683	100.00
Valid votes		8,564	99.34	8,683	99.72
Invalid/blank votes		57	0.66	24	0.28
Total votes		8,621	100.00	8,707	100.00
Registered voters/turnout		9,543	90.34	9,543	91.24
Free Liberal hold					
Source: Electoral Council, Huygens Institute

1909 general election: Alkmaar
Candidate	Party	First round		Second round	
Candidate	Party	Votes	%	Votes	%
Nicolaas Glinderman	AR	3,562	40.17	3,759	43.15
Pieter van Foreest	VL	2,806	31.65	4,953	56.85
F.C.J. Netscher	VD	2,245	25.32		
J.G. van Kuykhof	SDAP	254	2.86		
Total		8,867	100.00	8,712	100.00
Valid votes		8,867	98.65	8,712	99.33
Invalid/blank votes		121	1.35	59	0.67
Total votes		8,988	100.00	8,771	100.00
Registered voters/turnout		10,270	87.52	10,270	85.40
Free Liberal hold					
Source: Electoral Council, Huygens Institute

=== Elections in the 1910s ===
1913 general election: Alkmaar
Candidate	Party	First round		Second round	
Candidate	Party	Votes	%	Votes	%
Pieter van Foreest	VL	4,621	43.07	6,144	57.49
Reinhardt Snoeck Henkemans	CHU	4,505	41.99	4,544	42.51
Adriaan Gerhard	SDAP	1,603	14.94		
Total		10,729	100.00	10,688	100.00
Valid votes		10,729	99.17	10,688	99.59
Invalid/blank votes		90	0.83	44	0.41
Total votes		10,819	100.00	10,732	100.00
Registered voters/turnout		11,523	93.89	11,523	93.14
Free Liberal hold					
Source: Electoral Council, Huygens Institute

1917 general election: Alkmaar
Candidate	Party	Votes	%
Pieter van Foreest	VL		
Total			
Registered voters/turnout		12,557	–
Free Liberal hold			
Source: Electoral Council, Huygens Institute
