= 1887 Dutch general election =

- 1 September 1887 (first round); 14 September 1887 (second round)
- All 86 seats in the House of Representatives; 44 seats needed for a majority
- Turnout: 55.14%
Party	Leader	Seats
LU	Hendrik Goeman Borgesius	48
ARP	Abraham Kuyper	19
Catholics	Bernardus Bahlmann & Herman Schaepman	19
This lists parties that won seats. See the complete results below.
Cabinet before	Cabinet after
Jan Heemskerk cabinet Conservative–Liberal	Jan Heemskerk cabinet Conservative–Liberal

General elections were held in the Netherlands on 1 September 1887, with a second round in two constituencies on 14 September.

== Electoral system ==
Of the 86 seats in the House of Representatives, 8 were elected in single-member constituencies using the two-round system.

The other 78 were elected using two-round plurality block voting in 35 constituencies from 2 to 7 seats. To be elected in the first round, a candidate had to reach an electoral threshold of 50% of the number of valid votes cast, divided by the number of seats up for election in the district.

== Results ==
Party	Votes	%	Seats
Liberal Union			48
Anti-Revolutionary Party			19
Catholics			19
Conservatives			0
Total			86
Total votes	74,431	–	
Registered voters/turnout	134,987	55.14	
Source: Bromley & Kossman, Nohlen & Stöver

=== By district ===
Liberal Anti-Revolutionary Catholic Conservative

District results for the Dutch general election, 1887
District	Incumbent	Winner	Ref.
Alkmaar	Jacob Leonard de Bruyn Kops		
Alkmaar	Willem van der Kaay		
Almelo	Jan van Alphen		
Almelo	Jan Reijnaud Corver Hooft	Willem Cremers	
Amersfoort	Frederik van Bylandt		
Amersfoort	Levinus Keuchenius		
Amsterdam	Willem Hendrik de Beaufort		
Amsterdam	Jacob Theodoor Cremer		
Amsterdam	Adriaan Gildemeester		
Amsterdam	Johan George Gleichman		
Amsterdam	Abraham Hartogh		
Amsterdam	Jan Rutgers van Rozenburg	Arnold Kerdijk	
Amsterdam	Herman Jacob Kist		
Appingedam	Derk de Ruiter Zijlker		
Appingedam	Jan Schepel		
Arnhem	Willem Rooseboom		
Arnhem	Philippe Willem van der Sleijden		
Assen	Warmold Albertinus van der Feltz		
Assen	Harm Smeenge		
Boxmeer	Jean Clercx		
Boxmeer	Leopold Haffmans		
Breda	Jan van den Biesen		
Breda	Herman Schaepman		
Brielle	Gerardus Jacobus Goekoop		
Delft	Arnoldus van Berckel		
Delft	Jan Christiaan Fabius		
Den Bosch	Pierre Guillaume Jean van der Schrieck		
Den Bosch	Antonius Franciscus Vos de Wael		
Den Haag	Henri van der Goes van Dirxland		
Den Haag	Lodewijk Gerard Greeve		
Deventer	Albertus van Delden		
Deventer	Herman Jacob Dijckmeester		
Dokkum	Egbert Broer Kielstra		
Dokkum	Wilco Julius van Welderen Rengers		
Dordrecht	Gijsbertus Martinus van der Linden		
Dordrecht	Johannes Barendinus van Osenbruggen		
Eindhoven	Antonius van Baar		
Eindhoven	Petrus Jacobus Franciscus Vermeulen		
Goes	Alexander de Savornin Lohman		
Goes	Alexander Schimmelpenninck van der Oye		
Gorinchem	Barthold Jacob Lintelo de Geer van Jutphaas		
Gorinchem	Hendrik Seret		
Gouda	Karel Antonie Godin de Beaufort		
Gouda	Ulrich Herman Huber		
Groningen	Samuel van Houten		
Haarlem	Antonie Farncombe Sanders		
Haarlem	Willem de Meijier		
Haarlemmermeer	Frederic Reekers		
Hilversum	Theodoor Philip Mackay		
Hoorn	Willem Karel van Dedem		
Hoorn	Dirk Visser van Hazerswoude		
Leeuwarden	Franciscus Lieftinck		
Leeuwarden	Johannis Zaaijer		
Leiden	Johannes Petrus Smeele	Johannes Hendricus Donner	
Leiden	Otto van Wassenaer van Catwijck		
Maastricht	Gustave Ruijs van Beerenbroek		
Maastricht	Leonard Frans Hubert Carl Ruland		
Middelburg	Johan Buteux		
Middelburg	Arie Smit		
Nijmegen	Maximilien Joseph Caspar Marie Kolkman		
Nijmegen	Anthonie Ernst Reuther		
Roermond	Hubert Joachim Brouwers		
Roermond	Jerôme Lambrechts		
Rotterdam	Jan van Gennep		
Rotterdam	Rudolf Pieter Mees		
Rotterdam	Herman Cornelis Verniers van der Loeff		
Rotterdam	Willem Adriaan Viruly Verbrugge		
Sneek	Age Buma		
Sneek	Pieter Johannes Gesinus van Diggelen		
Sneek	Bernardus Hermanus Heldt		
Steenwijk	Jan Rudolf Meesters		
Tiel	Frederik van Aylva van Pallandt		
Tiel	Gerard Beelaerts van Blokland		
Tilburg	Bernardus Marie Bahlmann		
Tilburg	Ferdinandus Borret		
Utrecht	Æneas Mackay		
Utrecht	Jan Schimmelpenninck van der Oye		
Winschoten	Hendrik Goeman Borgesius		
Winschoten	Jan de Vos van Steenwijk	Hendrik Lodewijk Drucker (Note: Did not accept his seat. He was later replaced by Jan de Vos van Steenwijk.)	
Zevenbergen	Allard van der Borch van Verwolde		
Zierikzee	Jacob Johan van Kerkwijk		
Zuidhorn	Eppo Cremers		
Zutphen	Sebastiaan de Ranitz		
Zutphen	Jan Willink		
Zwolle	Titus van Asch van Wijck		
Zwolle	Alexander van Dedem		
