= Sebastiaan Matheus Sigismund de Ranitz =

Sebastiaan Matheus Sigismund de Ranitz may refer to one of several people.

- Sebastiaan Matheus Sigismund de Ranitz (1833–1909), Dutch jurist and parliamentarian
- Sebastiaan Mattheus Sigismund de Ranitz (1846–1916), Dutch patrician and artist
- Sebastiaan Matheus Sigismund de Ranitz (1901–1987), Dutch jurist and Nazi collaborator
