= Gelderland (disambiguation) =

Gelderland is a province of the Netherlands.

Gelderland may also refer to:

- Guelders, a historical region in the Holy Roman Empire
- Gelderland horse, a breed of horses from Gelderland
- HNLMS Gelderland, two ships of the Royal Netherlands Navy
