= 1877 Dutch general election =

Partial general elections were held in the Netherlands on 12 June 1877 to elect 40 of the 80 seats in the House of Representatives.

== Electoral system ==
Of the 80 seats in the House of Representatives, 8 were elected in single-member constituencies using the two-round system.

The other 72 were elected using two-round plurality block voting in 33 constituencies from 2 to 6 seats. To be elected in the first round, a candidate had to reach an electoral threshold of 50% of the number of valid votes cast, divided by the number of seats up for election in the district.

== Results ==
Party	Votes	%	Seats
Liberals			45
Catholics			16
Anti-Revolutionaries			9
Conservatives			7
Conservative Liberals			3
Total			80
Total votes	61,024	–	
Registered voters/turnout	107,910	56.55	
Source: Bromley & Kossman, Nohlen & Stöver

=== By district ===
Liberal Conservative Anti-revolutionary Catholic

District results for the Dutch general election, 1877
District	Incumbent	Winner	Ref.
Alkmaar	Willem van der Kaay		
Almelo	Herman Albrecht Insinger		
Amersfoort	Æneas Mackay		
Amsterdam	Thomas Joannes Stieltjes Sr.		
Amsterdam	Michiel Johan de Lange	Jan Rutgers van Rozenburg	
Amsterdam	Gerhardus Fabius	Petrus Hendrik Holtzman	
Appingedam	Jan Schepel		
Arnhem	Willem Hendrik Dullert		
Assen	Lucas Oldenhuis Gratama		
Boxmeer	Leopold Haffmans		
Breda	Aloysius Luyben		
Delft	Johannes Leonardus Nierstrasz	Adriaan Schagen van Leeuwen	
Den Bosch	Franciscus van Zinnicq Bergmann		
Den Haag	Rutger Jan Schimmelpenninck van Nijenhuis		
Deventer	Alex Schimmelpenninck van der Oye	Albertus van Delden	
Dokkum	Binnert Philip van Harinxma thoe Slooten		
Dordrecht	Jan Pieter Bredius		
Eindhoven	Antonius van Baar		
Gorinchem	James John Teding van Berkhout		
Gouda	Marinus Bichon van IJsselmonde		
Haarlem	Charles Jean François Mirandolle		
Hoorn	Isaäc Dignus Fransen van de Putte		
Leeuwarden	Sybrand Hingst		
Leiden	Isaäc Lambertus Cremer van den Berch van Heemstede		
Maastricht	Guillaume Kerens de Wylré		
Middelburg	Daniël van Eck		
Nijmegen	Christianus Joannes Antonius Heydenrijck		
Roermond	Jerôme Lambrechts		
Rotterdam	Willem Adriaan Viruly Verbrugge		
Rotterdam	Herman Cornelis Verniers van der Loeff		
Sneek	Schelte Wybenga		
Sneek	Wieger Hendrikus Idzerda		
Tiel	Hendrik Anthon van Rappard	Herman Jacob Dijckmeester	
Tilburg	Johannes Verheyen		
Utrecht	Jan Messchert van Vollenhoven	Joan Röell	
Winschoten	Willem Jozef Andreas Jonckbloet		
Zierikzee	Jacob Johan van Kerkwijk		
Zuidhorn	Eppo Cremers		
Zutphen	Lambertus Eduard Lenting		
Zwolle	Johannes Albertus Sandberg		
