= 1868 Dutch general election =

General elections were held in the Netherlands on 22 January 1868.

== Electoral system ==
Of the 75 seats in the House of Representatives, 8 were elected in single-member constituencies using the two-round system.

The other 67 were elected using two-round plurality block voting in 31 constituencies from 2 to 6 seats. To be elected in the first round, a candidate had to reach an electoral threshold of 50% of the number of valid votes cast, divided by the number of seats up for election in the district.

== Results ==
Party	Votes	%	Seats
Liberals			36
Conservatives			20
Conservative Liberals			10
Catholics			5
Anti-Revolutionaries			4
Total			75
Total votes	65,532	–	
Registered voters/turnout	100,110	65.46	
Source: Bromley & Kossman, Nohlen & Stöver

=== By district ===
District	Members elected	Group	Ref.
Alkmaar	Jacob Leonard de Bruyn Kops	Liberal	
Alkmaar	Cornelis van Foreest (Note: Incumbent.)	Conservative	
Almelo	Jacob Kalff	Conservative	
Almelo	Gijsbertus Martinus van der Linden	Thorbeckian liberal	
Amersfoort	Jan Karel van Goltstein	Conservative	
Amersfoort	E.L. van Hardenbroek van Lockhorst	Conservative	
Amsterdam	Michel Henry Godefroi	Conservative liberal	
Amsterdam	Herman Albrecht Insinger	Conservative	
Amsterdam	Gerlach Cornelis Joannes van Reenen	Conservative	
Amsterdam	Menso Johannes Pijnappel	Conservative liberal	
Amsterdam	Jan Jacob Rochussen	Conservative	
Amsterdam	Jan Heemskerk Bzn.	Thorbeckian liberal	
Appingedam	Derk de Ruiter Zijlker	Liberal	
Appingedam	Rembertus Westerhoff	Thorbeckian liberal	
Arnhem	L.A.J.W. Sloet van de Beele	Thorbeckian liberal	
Arnhem	Willem Hendrik Dullert (Note: Incumbent member for Groningen.)	Thorbeckian liberal	
Assen	Johan Rudolph Thorbecke	Thorbeckian liberal	
Assen	Lucas Oldenhuis Gratama	Liberal	
Boxmeer	H.C.F. Kerstens	Pragmatic liberal	
Breda	Norbertus Reinerus Henricus Guljé	Thorbeckian liberal	
Breda	P.J.J. Hollingerus Pijpers	Thorbeckian liberal	
Delft	Johannes van Kuijk	Conservative	
Delft	Johannes Leonardus Nierstrasz	Conservative	
Den Bosch	J.M.B.J. van der Does de Willebois	Conservative (Catholic)	
Den Bosch	F.J.E. van Zinnicq Bergmann	Conservative (Catholic)	
Den Haag	François de Casembroot	Conservative	
Den Haag	Cornelis Ascanius van Sypesteyn	Conservative	
Deventer	Albertus van Delden	Thorbeckian liberal	
Deventer	Gerard Dumbar	Thorbeckian liberal	
Dokkum	Philippus van Blom	Thorbeckian liberal	
Dokkum	Sybrand van Beyma thoe Kingma	Liberal	
Dordrecht	Pieter Blussé van Oud-Alblas	Thorbeckian liberal	
Dordrecht	Pieter Philip van Bosse	Liberal	
Eindhoven	Johannes Baptista Bots	Thorbeckian liberal	
Eindhoven	Petrus Johannes Antonius Smitz	Conservative (Catholic)	
Goes	Pieter Hendrik Saaymans Vader	Anti-revolutionary	
Gorinchem	Warnardus Cornelis Mathildus Begram	Conservative	
Gorinchem	Gerrit Simons	Conservative	
Gouda	Willem Maurits de Brauw	Conservative	
Gouda	Mari Aert Frederic Henri Hoffmann	Conservative	
Groningen	Johan Herman Geertsema	Liberal	
Haarlem	Willem van der Hucht	Conservative	
Haarlem	Daniël Koorders	Conservative	
Hoorn	Jeronimo de Bosch Kemper	Conservative	
Hoorn	Willem van Goltstein van Oldenaller	Conservative	
Leeuwarden	J.K.H. de Roo van Alderwerelt	Liberal	
Leeuwarden	Sybrand Hingst	Liberal	
Leiden	P.H. Taets van Amerongen tot Natewisch	Conservative	
Leiden	Otto van Wassenaer van Catwijck	Anti-revolutionary	
Maastricht	Ch.A. de Bieberstein Rogalla Zawadsky	Thorbeckian liberal	
Maastricht	P.Th. van der Maesen de Sombreff	Thorbeckian liberal	
Middelburg	Daniël van Eck	Thorbeckian liberal	
Middelburg	Gerrit Adriaan Fokker	Thorbeckian liberal	
Nijmegen	Christianus Joannes Antonius Heydenrijck	Conservative (Catholic)	
Nijmegen	Joannes van Nispen van Sevenaer	Pragmatic liberal	
Roermond	Karel Lodewijk Joseph Cornelis	Thorbeckian liberal	
Roermond	Leopold Haffmans	Conservative (Catholic)	
Rotterdam	François Willem Cornelis Blom	Liberal	
Rotterdam	Isaäc Dignus Fransen van de Putte	Liberal	
Rotterdam	Willem Adriaan Viruly Verbrugge	Liberal	
Sneek	Antony Moens	Liberal	
Sneek	Schelte Wybenga	Liberal	
Steenwijk	Carel Marius Storm van 's-Gravesande	Liberal	
Tiel	Willem Frederik Carel van Lidth de Jeude	Conservative	
Tilburg	Ferdinandus Hendricus Hubertus Borret	Conservative (Catholic)	
Tilburg	J.B.A.J.M. Verheyen	Conservative (Catholic)	
Utrecht	Evert du Marchie van Voorthuysen	Conservative	
Utrecht	Nicolaas Pieter Jacob Kien	Conservative	
Winschoten	Willem Jonckbloet	Liberal	
Zierikzee	Jacob Johan van Kerkwijk	Liberal	
Zuidhorn	Geert Reinders	Pragmatic liberal	
Zutphen	Jacob Dam	Thorbeckian liberal	
Zutphen	Lambertus Eduard Lenting	Thorbeckian liberal	
Zwolle	Jan Willem Gefken	Anti-revolutionary	
Zwolle	Albertus van Naamen van Eemnes	Liberal	
