= Willem Hendrik de Beaufort =

Dutch politician (1845–1918)

- De Beaufort in 1913

Minister of Foreign Affairs
- In office 27 July 1897 – 1 August 1901
- Ministry: Pierson
- Preceded by: Joan Röell
- Succeeded by: Robert Melvil van Lynden

Member of the House of Representatives
- In office 23 April 1877 – 17 September 1883
- Preceded by: Hendrik Anthon van Rappard
- Succeeded by: Gerard Beelaerts van Blokland
- Constituency: Tiel
- In office 17 November 1884 – 27 July 1897
- Succeeded by: Constituency abolished
- Constituency: Amsterdam
- In office 19 September 1905 – 15 September 1913
- Preceded by: Cornelis Jacob
- Succeeded by: Boudewijn Nierstrasz
- Constituency: Amsterdam VI
- In office 16 September 1913 – 2 April 1918
- Preceded by: Hubert van Asch van Wijck
- Succeeded by: Anthon van Rappard
- Constituency: Amersfoort

Personal details
- Born: 19 March 1845 Leusden, Netherlands
- Died: 2 April 1918 (aged 73) The Hague, Netherlands
- Party: League of Free Liberals (from 1906)
- Spouse: Adèle Maria van Eeghen (m. 1873)
- Children: 7; including Lieven Ferdinand
- Education: Utrecht University

Willem Hendrik de Beaufort (19 March 1845 – 2 April 1918) was a Dutch statesman and essayist who served as Minister of Foreign Affairs in the Pierson ministry from 1897 until 1901, and intermittently as a member of the House of Representatives from 1877 until his death in 1918.

Born to a family of French descent belonging to the landed gentry, De Beaufort studied law at Utrecht University and subsequently travelled to several places throughout Europe and the Middle East before marrying and settling in his family estate of Den Treek, where he became a historical essayist. First elected to the House of Representatives in 1877, he soon became a leading figure in the conservative wing among the liberals in parliament, serving as chair of the liberal parliamentary group between 1886 and 1891. His anti-clericalism led him to strongly oppose the confessional politics of the alliance between Protestants and Catholics known as the Coalition, and he engaged in a pamphlet war with Abraham Kuyper, leader of the Anti-Revolutionary Party, in 1889.

From 1897 to 1901, De Beaufort served as foreign minister in the Pierson ministry. During his ministership, he was involved with the organisation of the 1899 Hague Convention, and pursued a policy of strict neutrality in the Second Boer War in spite of strong sympathies for the Boers in the country, for which he endured much criticism. After his ministership, he returned to the House of Representatives, in which he served until his death in 1918. During this period, he was offered the leadership of a liberal ministry in 1905, and participated in the 1907 Hague Convention.

== Early life and education ==
Den Treek manor, De Beaufort's ancestral home, in 1870

De Beaufort came from a Huguenot family originally from Meaux. His ancestor Pierre de Beaufort settled in the Netherlands in 1613, entered the service of Frederick Henry, Prince of Orange in 1625, and settled in Hulst, where he founded a family of magistrates, who held the office of mayor from father to son and were held in high regard by the House of Orange. Thus, Pieter Benjamin de Beaufort, Lord of Duivendijke, became intendant and steward to Prince William IV. His son Joachim Ferdinand left Hulst and became bailiff of the Barony of IJsselstein, a domain of the House of Orange. His son Willem Hendrik, who served as a member of the provincial executive of Utrecht, purchased the Den Treek estate in Leusden. His eldest son, Aernout Jan, married to Anna Aleida Stoop, resolved to continue his father's agricultural work, but set out when the Belgian Revolution broke out. He took little part in public life, but served as a member of the Provincial Council of Utrecht.

Willem Hendrik de Beaufort was born to Aernout Jan de Beaufort and Anna Aleida Stoop in the Den Treek manor on 19 March 1845. After initially being schooled at home, he attended the Latin school in Utrecht, and then studied Roman and contemporary law at Utrecht University from 16 September 1861 onwards. At university, he attended lectures on history from several prominent scholars, including Cornelis Willem Opzoomer, and gained prominence through his role as rector of the student corps. In 1863, he travelled to England and Germany. De Beaufort received his doctorate on 12 June 1868 with a dissertation about the relationship between the state and various religious denominations in the Dutch Republic, which established him as an advocate of tolerance and religious freedom.

After his promotion, he concluded his education with a number of travels across Europe, including to Switzerland in 1868 and to Rome in 1869. He settled in Amsterdam in 1869, ostensibly as a lawyer, but in fact with the aim of "studying the life and society of this great capital". Here he became acquainted with leading figures in the fields of commerce and finance, including Nicolaas Pierson and Maurits van Hall, and various literary figures. In 1870 and 1871, he travelled through the Middle East on several occasions, coming into contact with Ferdinand de Lesseps in Egypt, and with Emir Abdelkader in Palestine, before visiting Constantinople and Athens. After his wedding in 1873, De Beaufort settled in the Den Treek estate, which had been vacant since his father's death in 1866. He gained a reputation as a talented historical essayist, writing mostly for the literary periodical De Gids, of which he became the editor in 1876. Due to his works on the Patriottentijd, as well as contemporary history, he is regarded as a pioneer in national historiography.

== First parliamentary tenure ==
De Beaufort stood for election to the Provincial Council of Utrecht, but was unexpectedly defeated by a Catholic commoner, who had owed his victory to an alliance of the Catholics and the Protestant Anti-Revolutionary Party. De Beaufort would oppose this "unholy alliance" throughout his political career. De Beaufort subsequently stood in the 1877 parliamentary by-election in the district of Tiel, where the retiring member Donald Mackay, 11th Lord Reay, a friend of his, had drawn voters' attention to him. He defeated P.A.C.H.T.A. Werdmöller von Elgg, the mayor of Culemborg, and took office as a member of the House of Representatives on 23 April 1877. He briefly served in the Senate for South Holland in 1884 after losing re-election in Tiel, but returned to the House for the district of Amsterdam the same year.

Though he was never a member of the Liberal Union, De Beaufort joined the liberal group in parliament. When the disappointment of the Kappeyne ministry split the liberal group into conservative and progressive wings in 1879, De Beaufort found himself on the former side, though more anti-clerical than most of his peers. In parliamentary debates, he spoke on matters related to higher education and water management, and soon gained respect for his level-headed judgement and his extensive knowledge of constitutional law and history. In March 1886, De Beaufort became chairman of the liberal parliamentary group, which had been re-established two years prior. He held this position until September 1891, when he was succeeded by Willem van der Kaay. Despite his alignment with the liberals, however, De Beaufort maintained some degree of independence, and was willing to set aside personal success or dogmatic convictions in favour of the public interest.

This became apparent during the debate on a proposed constitutional reform in 1887. De Beaufort had tabled an amendment which would expand eligibility to membership of the Senate to those who held or had held an important public office. This amendment was passed by the House, but proved unacceptable to interior minister Jan Heemskerk. De Beaufort proposed a compromise in order to avoid bringing the matter to head. Despite his conservative social views, he ultimately came to accept the expansion of democracy and universal suffrage; his 1887 amendment was primarily intended to give the Senate greater standing and prestige in relation to a House of Representatives that would in future be elected by the entire population.

In 1889, De Beaufort engaged in a pamphlet war with Abraham Kuyper, leader of the Anti-Revolutionary Party, who had delivered an opening address to the tenth Deputies' Assembly entitled Niet de Vrijheidsboom maar het Kruis ("Not the Tree of Liberty but the Cross"). In a short but incisive article entitled De Deputaten-vergadering ("The Deputies' Assembly"), he took issue with Kuyper's use of history, in which the regenten in the Dutch Republic are equated to the Bourbons and the Stuarts. De Beaufort opposed Kuyper's intermingling of religion and politics, which he believed had been fatal to both dynasties. Kuyper responded with an article of his own, in which he defended his reading of history, as well as his alliance with the Catholics. De Beaufort responded in turn with a brochure entitled Tegen Dr A. Kuyper ("Against Dr A. Kuyper"), which began with a principled outline of the liberal views on the practical significance of the "submission of the state to God" and cooperation with the Catholics, but then made a case for the regenten of the 18th century.

== Ministership ==
The Pierson ministry

After the 1897 general election, De Beaufort joined the liberal Pierson ministry as Minister of Foreign Affairs, taking office on 27 July of that year. By this time, the liberals had broken up into separate wings again, and De Beaufort represented the conservative grouping called the "old liberals" or "free liberals". His appointment had raised from the more progressive grouping around prospective interior minister Hendrik Goeman Borgesius, but Nicolaas Pierson, formateur and leader of the cabinet, insisted on his inclusion. De Beaufort would remain foreign minister until 1 August 1901.

As foreign minister, De Beaufort was involved in organising the 1899 Hague Convention. He saw potential difficulties in hosting such a convention, including decisions on whether to extend invitations to the Holy See, the Boer republics and the Principality of Bulgaria, all of which were diplomatically sensitive. Nevertheless, he favoured its organisation, and invitations were sent on 9 April 1899 "in agreement with the Russian Imperial Government", which had initiated the conference, without any diplomatic repercussions. The Kingdom of Italy threatened to boycott the conference in case an invitation was extended to the Holy See, so De Beaufort instead managed to persuade Queen Wilhelmina to elicit a written expression of support for the event from Pope Leo XIII, to make clear, especially to Dutch Catholics, that the Dutch government was not at fault for his absence. During the conference, De Beaufort served as honorary chairman.

Aside from the peace conference, De Beaufort was responsible for the Dutch response to the Second Boer War. Recognising the Boers could expect no support from any foreign power, he advised Willem Johannes Leyds to "seek only one ally: public opinion in England". After the conflict had broken out, although his sympathy, as that of the Dutch public, lay overwhelmingly with the Boers, De Beaufort sought to avoid direct involvement and pursued a policy of strict neutrality. He faced sharp criticism for this position, above all from Abraham Kuyper, who implied the government might have succumbed to the lure of the Rand's gold and diamond deposits. Furthermore, Queen Wilhelmina criticised him for reacting too hesitantly following the enactment of a British blockade and measures taken against Dutch Red Cross workers. In the final months of his tenure as minister, De Beaufort was repeatedly urged to advise the Boers to prevent further bloodshed and to give up their resistance, but he refused to "pave the way for their submission to England", and he lamented the outcome of the war as an irreparable loss for "the Dutch race". In 1900, he had the HNLMS Gelderland sent to South Africa to transport Paul Kruger to Europe.

== Later life ==
A political cartoon showing Pierson attempting in vain to persuade De Beaufort to talk with the Social Democrats Troelstra and Van der Zwaag

After his ministership, De Beaufort spent a few years out of office before returning to the House of Representatives for the district of Amsterdam in the 1905 general election. The election had seen the Coalition, comprising the three confessional parties, narrowly lose its majority in parliament, prompting the incumbent Kuyper ministry to tender its resignation. Nevertheless, liberal parties lacked a majority as well, complicating the formation of a new ministry. Goeman Borgesius was tasked with forming a new ministry, though, not wanting to resign his seat in parliament, he did not wish to take part in it himself. He authored a political programme that could count on the support of the free liberals, and approached De Beaufort with the proposal to recommend him to the Queen as leader of this ministry. However, despite Pierson's urging him to accept the offer, De Beaufort refused out of disagreement with the programme and a proposed constitutional amendment. The position would ultimately go to Theo de Meester.

De Beaufort continued to represent Amsterdam VI in parliament, and moved to the district of Amersfoort in 1913. He became deputy chairman of the free liberal group in parliament in the same year. During his second tenure in parliament, he also served as the first delegate of the Dutch delegation to the 1907 Hague Convention. Willem Hendrik de Beaufort served in parliament until his death in The Hague on 2 April 1918, at the age of 73. He was commemorated in the House of Representatives on 9 April; then-prime minister Pieter Cort van der Linden spoke on behalf of the government.

== Private life ==
On 20 March 1873, De Beaufort married Adèle Maria van Eeghen, who came from a notable Mennonite merchant family from Amsterdam. The couple had two daughters and five sons, including the biologist Lieven Ferdinand de Beaufort. He belonged to the "middle orthodox" wing of the Dutch Reformed Church, and identified as a humanist.
