= 1883 Dutch general election =

Partial general elections were held in the Netherlands on 12 June 1883, with voters electing 43 of the 86 seats in the House of Representatives.

== Electoral system ==
Of the 86 seats in the House of Representatives, 8 were elected in single-member constituencies using the two-round system.

The other 78 were elected using two-round plurality block voting in 35 constituencies from 2 to 7 seats. To be elected in the first round, a candidate had to reach an electoral threshold of 50% of the number of valid votes cast, divided by the number of seats up for election in the district.

== Results ==
Party	Votes	%	Seats
Liberals			45
Anti-Revolutionary Party			18
Catholics			18
Conservatives			5
Total			86
Total votes	75,056	–	
Registered voters/turnout	122,399	61.32	
Source: Bromley & Kossman, Nohlen & Stöver

=== By district ===
Liberal Conservative Anti-Revolutionary Catholic

District results for the Dutch general election, 1883
District	Incumbent	Winner	Ref.
Alkmaar	Jacob Leonard de Bruyn Kops		
Almelo	Jan Reijnaud Corver Hooft		
Amersfoort	Frederik van Bylandt		
Amsterdam	Jan Willem Hendrik Rutgers van Rozenburg		
Amsterdam	Johan George Gleichman		
Amsterdam	Justus Dirks		
Appingedam	Derk de Ruiter Zijlker		
Arnhem	Arthur Kool	Alex Schimmelpenninck van der Oye	
Assen	Warmold Albertinus van der Feltz		
Boxmeer	Jean Clercx		
Breda	Herman Agatho des Amorie van der Hoeven		
Brielle	Karel Anton Rombach		
Delft	François de Casembroot	Arnoldus van Berckel	
Den Bosch	Pierre Guillaume Jean van der Schrieck		
Den Haag	Willem Wintgens		
Deventer	Pieter Blussé van Oud-Alblas		
Dokkum	Willem Adriaan Bergsma		
Dordrecht	Johannes Barendinus van Osenbruggen		
Eindhoven	Petrus Jacobus Franciscus Vermeulen		
Goes	Alexander de Savornin Lohman		
Gorinchem	Levinus Wilhelmus Christiaan Keuchenius		
Gouda	Karel Antonie Godin de Beaufort		
Groningen	Samuel van Houten		
Haarlem	Willem de Meijier		
Haarlemmermeer	Frederic Reekers		
Hilversum	Theodoor Philip Mackay		
Hoorn	Klaas de Jong		
Leeuwarden	Franciscus Lieftinck		
Leiden	Otto van Wassenaer van Catwijck		
Maastricht	Gustave Ruijs van Beerenbroek		
Middelburg	Pieter Cornelis 't Hooft		
Nijmegen	Joannes van Nispen van Sevenaer		
Roermond	Hubert Joachim Brouwers		
Rotterdam	Rudolf Pieter Mees		
Rotterdam	Otto van Rees		
Sneek	Philippus van Blom		
Steenwijk	Gijsbert Hendrik Thomassen à Thuessink van der Hoop		
Tiel	Willem Hendrik de Beaufort	Gerard Beelaerts van Blokland	
Tilburg	Ferdinandus Borret		
Utrecht	Jacob Nicolaas Bastert (Note: Considered to be a conservative liberal.)		
Winschoten	Jan Willem Jacobus de Vos van Steenwijk		
Zutphen	Willem Gerard Brantsen van de Zijp		
Zwolle	Alexander van Dedem		
