= Sebastiaan Matheus Sigismund de Ranitz (1833–1909) =

Jonkheer Sebastiaan Matheus Sigismund de Ranitz
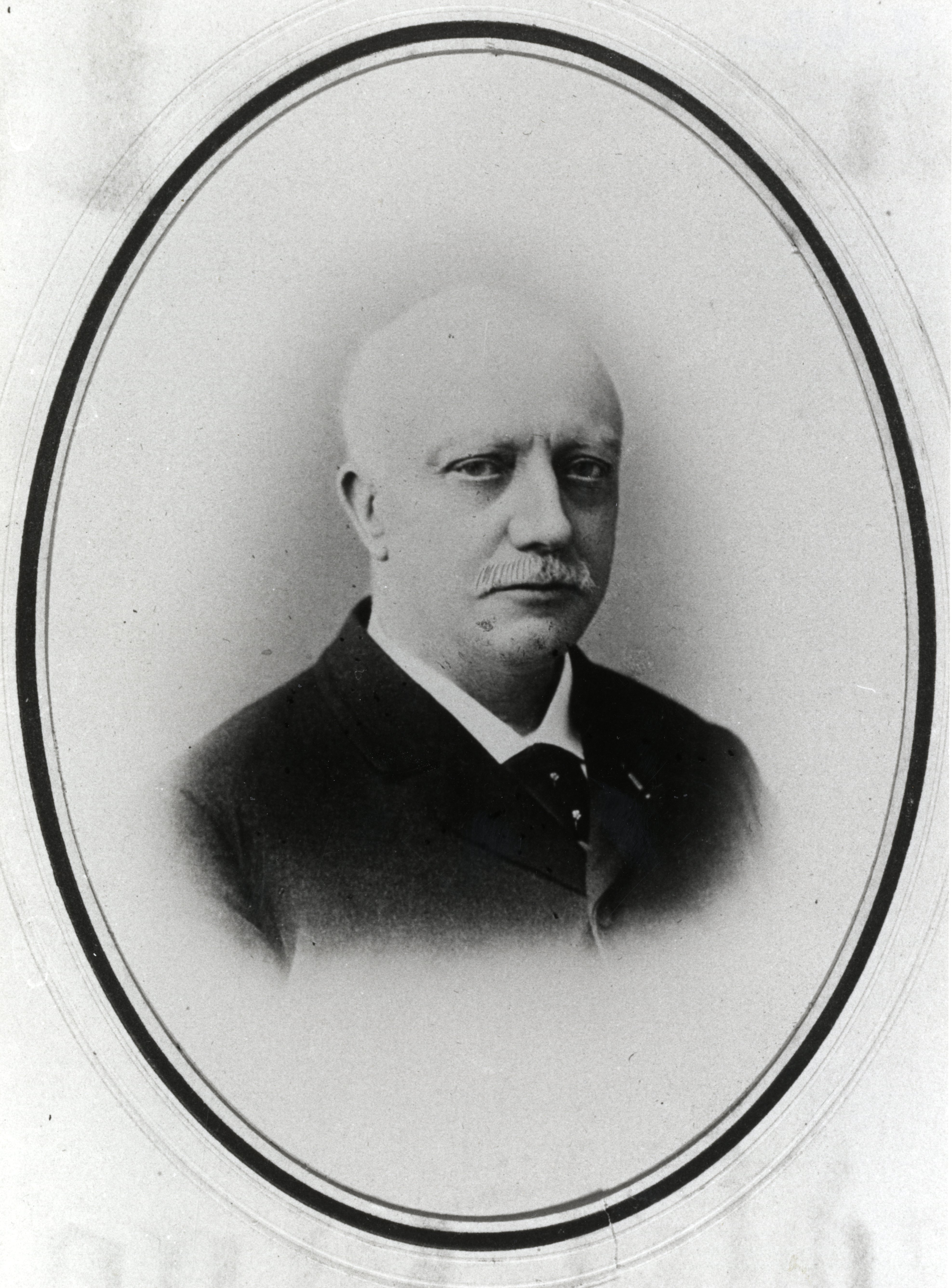

Member of the House of Representatives
- In office 17 November 1884 – 27 March 1888

Personal details
- Born: 10 July 1833 Groningen, Netherlands
- Died: 25 February 1909 (aged 75) The Hague, Netherlands
- Party: Liberal Union
- Occupation: Jurist, politician

Sebastiaan Matheus Sigismund de Ranitz (10 July 1833 – 25 February 1909) was a Dutch jurist and parliamentarian. He served three terms in the House of Representatives, as well as nineteen years as a justice of the Supreme Court of the Netherlands.

== Biography ==
De Ranitz was born in Groningen, the Netherlands, on 10 July 1833. He was the son of Herman, the city's mayor, and Maria Elisabeth Crommelin. The younger de Ranitz completed his legal studies in Utrecht, graduating in 1858. He practiced law, first as a public prosecutor in Winschoten, and then subsequently in Zutphen and Zwolle. On 1 April 1879, he became a prosecutor for the district court in Arnhem.

De Ranitz was elected to the House of Representatives, representing Zutphen, during the 1884 Dutch general election. A member of the Liberal Union, he and fellow liberal candidate J. Willink defeated the Anti-Revolutionary Party candidates W. G. Brantsen van de Zijp and J. D. C. van Heeckeren van Kell. In the elections of 1886 and 1887, De Ranitz was re-elected, ultimately serving until 27 March 1888. During his time in parliament, he served as the chairman of the Justice Committee (1887) and spoke about matters of crime, finance, and foreign affairs, as well as the revision of the Constitution of the Netherlands.

Effective 1 January 1889, De Ranitz left his prosecutorial role to become a justice with the Amsterdam Court of Appeal. He moved to the Hague Court of Appeals that July. On 10 May 1890, he was appointed to the Supreme Court of the Netherlands (also in The Hague) by King William III, taking office in June. The De Ranitz family was granted a noble predicate, jonkheer, by royal decree on 16 August 1906. At the time of De Ranitz' death on 25 February 1909, he was the oldest justice on the Supreme Court. He was a knight in the Order of the Netherlands Lion.

== Works cited ==
- Blok, P. J.; Molhuysen, P.J., eds. (1937). Nieuw Nederlandsch Biografisch Woordenboek [New Biographical Dictionary of the Netherlands] (in Dutch). Vol. 10. A.W. Sijthoff. pp. 777–778.
- "Familiebericht" [Family News]. Leeuwarder Courant (in Dutch). Leeuwarden. 12 July 1833. p. 2.
- "Jhr. mr. S.M.S. de Ranitz †". Algemeen Handelsblad (in Dutch). Amsterdam. 26 February 1909. p. 1.
- "Mr. S.M.S. de Ranitz" (in Dutch). Parlementair Documentatie Centrum. Archived from the original on 8 July 2023.
