= Willem Jan Knoop =

Dutch lieutenant-general, military historian, and politician

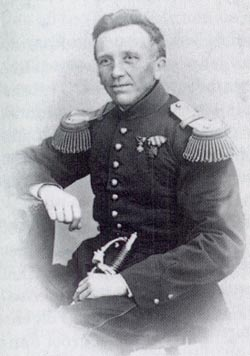
Willem Jan Knoop as a captain

Willem Jan Knoop (2 May 1811 in Deventer – 24 January 1894 in The Hague) was a Dutch lieutenant-general, military historian, and politician.

== Biography ==
Knoop, a lifelong bachelor, was the son of Colonel Willem Hendrik Knoop and Henrica Willemina Hartkamp. He spent his early years in Bruges (his father was military governor there) where he frequented the library of the Maatschappij der Letterkunde, a Dutch benevolent society, promoting popular education, where he proved a promising autodidact.

He started his military career at age 14 in 1825 as a volunteer in the Sixth Infantry Division in Bruges. In 1829 he was commissioned as a second-lieutenant of infantry. In 1842, with the rank of captain of infantry, he was appointed as professor of strategy, tactics, and military history at the Royal Military Academy of the Netherlands at Breda. (As such he was apportioned to the Dutch General Staff). As a reward for his work there he was made a knight in the Order of the Netherlands Lion in 1845.

=== Duel ===
This was remarkable, because in 1844 he had become involved in a celebrated scandal. Like many contemporary military men, Dutch officers were prone to duelling, though this was a criminal offense. A colleague of Knoop at the Academy, Professor Bolhuis, had quarrelled with a young cavalry officer, and Knoop had been one of his seconds at the ensuing duel. Unfortunately, Bolhuis had been killed at this duel on 14 February 1844, and Knoop had subsequently been arrested for his participation in this "affair of honor." He was court-martialed and acquitted, but after the prosecution appealed to the High Military Court, sentenced to three years in prison. However, he was soon pardoned by King Wiliam II, and apparently his career did not suffer.

=== The Siborne Controversy ===
As a young captain of the Dutch General Staff he wrote a rebuttal of the English historian William Siborne's account of the Battle of Quatre Bras and the Battle of Waterloo, published as History of the War in France and Flanders in 1815 in 1844, in which Siborne portrayed the conduct of the Dutch army at these battles as poor. Siborne's book had caused a furore in the Netherlands as Siborne was seen as insulting "the honor of the Dutch army", and of King William II of the Netherlands, who as Prince of Orange had commanded that army at both battles, and was revered as a national hero by the Dutch.

Though Knoop of course had been only four at the time of the battle, so he had no personal knowledge, he could avail himself of the recollections of many Dutch veterans who had been there, and as a general-staff member he had access to the after-battle reports the Dutch units had made within two days after the battle ended. (These archived reports could have been made available to Siborne, and in one case he appears to have been in actual possession of one, but he never bothered to consult them.) As a trained historian, Knoop now started to research these sources and wrote a rebuttal of Siborne's book based on all these sources. This book (published with the explicit consent of King William II as a semi-official rebuttal), was received with much enthusiasm in Dutch military circles. When soon thereafter there was a false rumor in the Dutch press that Siborne was on his way to demand satisfaction, six horse artillery officers offered to act as Knoop's seconds if necessary.

Knoop's book was soon translated in French and German, and met with much interest in France and Prussia at the time. These translations were sent to the editor of the United Service Magazine, but no acknowledgement was ever received, at least directly. However, many years later Knoop received an indirect indication that his book had registered, when in the 17 February 1855 issue of the magazine Athenaeum, in a review of another historical article by his hand (quite unrelated) he was introduced as the man "...who acquired his first reputation by an angry and dashing attack on Captain Siborne.". Siborne himself, though not deigning to reply directly to Knoop, wrote an indirect reply in a later edition of his work (reprinted in the modern edition) in which he repeated his negative characterisation of the Dutch-Belgian troops, and complained about the tone in Knoop's "pamphlet", which he described as "abusive." In defense of his claims, Siborne merely states that these are based on the testimony of the officers' accounts he analysed.

=== Further career ===
Knoop's military career progressed apace. Though his scholarly work at the Academy did not seem to prepare him for great military advances, he was promoted to colonel in 1858, commanding a regiment at Breda. In 1861 he was promoted to major-general, commanding divisions in Limburg and North Brabant until he temporarily went into politics in 1869. He was a Liberal, unlike many of his colleagues, and as such not very popular with King William III of the Netherlands (who had succeeded his father William II in 1850). Probably because of his political leanings he had been offered the post of Minister of War in a Liberal Cabinet in 1862, but he declined. In 1869 he stood for the Second Chamber of the States-General of the Netherlands in the district of Alkmaar and was elected. This required that he temporarily resigned his commission. But he was recalled to duty during the mobilisation of the Dutch army at the crisis of the Franco-Prussian War of 1870, during which the Netherlands maintained an armed neutrality. For that reason he had to resign his seat in parliament, as serving officers cannot sit in Dutch parliament. He retired as a lieutenant-general of infantry in 1872.

During his entire career Knoop was a recognized authority on military history. In 1847 he became a contributor to the literary magazine De Gids that published many scholarly articles on historical subjects. As such he became a friend and colleague of the eminent Dutch historian Robert Fruin, with whom he sometimes had friendly disputes. He was the editor-in-chief of the Dutch military history journal Militaire Spectator from 1849 till 1869. His renown as a historian earned him a membership of the Royal Netherlands Academy of Arts and Sciences in 1857. He also was president of the Vereeniging tot beoefening van de krijgswetenschap (Society for military arts and science) for many years.

In retirement he remained very active as a military scholar, writing many articles, and eventually publishing eleven volumes in a standard work on stadtholder William III. A listing of his works, and many of those articles, are available online in the Digital library for Dutch literature (see External Links).

Knoop died almost eighty-three years old in 1894.

== Sources ==
- (in Dutch) Netscher, P.M. (June, 1894) "Levensbericht van Willem Jan Knoop", in: Jaarboek van de Maatschappij der Nederlandse Letterkunde 1894, pp. 276–313
