= 1871 Dutch general election =

Partial general elections were held in the Netherlands on 13 June 1871 to elect 40 of the 80 seats in the House of Representatives.

== Electoral system ==
Of the 80 seats in the House of Representatives, 8 were elected in single-member constituencies using the two-round system.

The other 72 were elected using two-round plurality block voting in 33 constituencies from 2 to 6 seats. To be elected in the first round, a candidate had to reach an electoral threshold of 50% of the number of valid votes cast, divided by the number of seats up for election in the district.

== Results ==
Party	Votes	%	Seats
Liberals			43
Conservatives			15
Catholics			13
Anti-Revolutionaries			5
Conservative Liberals			4
Total			80
Total votes	60,443	–	
Registered voters/turnout	100,336	60.24	
Source: Bromley & Kossman, Nohlen & Stöver

=== By district ===
Liberal Conservative Anti-revolutionary Catholic

District results for the Dutch general election, 1871
District	Incumbent	Winner	Ref.
Alkmaar	Jacob Leonard de Bruyn Kops		
Almelo	Jacob Kalff	Barend Brouwer	
Amersfoort	Ernest Louis van Hardenbroek van Lockhorst		
Amsterdam	Eduard Herman s'Jacob		
Amsterdam	Gerlach Cornelis Joannes van Reenen		
Amsterdam	Herman Albrecht Insinger	Cornelis Fock	
Appingedam	Derk de Ruiter Zijlker		
Arnhem	Ludolph Sloet van de Beele	Jules van Zuylen van Nijevelt	
Assen	Hendrik Jan Smidt		
Boxmeer	Hyacinthus Kerstens	Petrus van den Heuvel	
Breda	Norbertus Guljé	Carel van Nispen tot Sevenaer	
Brielle	Karel Anton Rombach		
Delft	Johannes van Kuijk		
Den Bosch	Johannes van der Does de Willebois		
Den Haag	François de Casembroot	Willem Wintgens	
Deventer	Albertus van Delden		
Dokkum	Philippus van Blom	Willem Adriaan Bergsma	
Dordrecht	Pieter Blussé van Oud-Alblas	Willem Theodore Gevers Deynoot	
Eindhoven	Petrus Smitz		
Goes	Pieter Hendrik Saaymans Vader		
Gorinchem	Warnardus Cornelis Mathildus Begram		
Gouda	Mari Aert Frederic Henri Hoffmann		
Groningen	Samuel van Houten		
Haarlem	Willem van der Hucht	Jan Kappeyne van de Coppello	
Haarlemmermeer	Jan Rutgers van Rozenburg		
Hoorn	Willem van Goltstein van Oldenaller	Klaas de Jong	
Leeuwarden	Jan de Roo van Alderwerelt		
Leiden	Otto van Wassenaer van Catwijck		
Maastricht	Charles de Bieberstein Rogalla Zawadsky		
Middelburg	Johannes Tak van Poortvliet		
Nijmegen	Joannes van Nispen van Sevenaer		
Roermond	Jan Hendrik Arnoldts		
Rotterdam	Isaäc Dignus Fransen van de Putte		
Sneek	Antony Moens		
Steenwijk	Carel Marius Storm van 's-Gravesande		
Tiel	Theo van Lynden van Sandenburg	Donald Jacob Mackay	
Tilburg	Ferdinandus Borret		
Utrecht	Nicolaas Kien		
Zutphen	Jacob Dam		
Zwolle	Albertus van Naamen van Eemnes		
