= Donald Mackay, 11th Lord Reay =

British colonial governor (1839–1921)

The Right Honourable The Lord Reay KT GCSI GCIE PC FBA JP DL
- 1919 portrait by Anton van Anrooy

Governor of Bombay
- In office 1885–1890
- Monarch: Victoria
- Preceded by: Sir James Fergusson, Bt
- Succeeded by: The Lord Harris

Under-Secretary of State for India
- In office 11 March 1894 – 21 June 1895
- Monarch: Victoria
- Prime Minister: The Earl of Rosebery
- Preceded by: George W. E. Russell
- Succeeded by: The Earl of Onslow

Personal details
- Born: 22 December 1839 The Hague, Netherlands
- Died: 1 August 1921 (aged 81) Carolside, Berwickshire, Scotland
- Party: Liberal
- Spouse: Fanny Hasler

Donald James Mackay, 1st Baron Reay, 11th Lord Reay, KT, GCSI, GCIE, PC, FBA, JP, DL (22 December 1839 – 1 August 1921), in the Netherlands known as Donald Jacob, Baron Mackay, Lord of Ophemert and Zennewijnen, was a Dutch–British administrator and Liberal politician.

== Early life and education ==
Mackay was born Donald Jacob baron Mackay in The Hague, Netherlands, the son of Aeneas Mackay, 10th Lord Reay, a Dutch member of Parliament, and jonkvrouw Maria Catharina Anna Jacoba Fagel, daughter of mr. Jacob baron Fagel and jkvr. Maria Boreel, relative of the Boreel baronets. He attended the Gymnasium Haganum and studied law at Leiden University, receiving a doctorate in 1861 with a thesis on the judicial reforms of Herman Willem Daendels as governor-general of the Dutch East Indies.

Shortly after receiving his doctorate, Mackay was stationed as an attaché at the Dutch legation in London. He used his time in London to build relations, and to study the social question as, in addition to colonial policy, labour legislation held his interest. After his return to The Hague, he worked as an assistant clerk at the Department of Colonial Affairs for some years.

After he was appointed chairman by the Association for the Promotion of Manufacturing and Craft Industries, he devoted considerable effort to organising an "international exhibition of articles for the household and the craftsman's trade", for which he managed to secure the personal support of Napoleon III and his wife, and which he opened on 16 July 1869 in the presence of Prince Henry and various government officials. In the speeches he delivered on that occasion, he advocated the betterment of the worker's conditions as the best remedy against the "pernicious influences" that seek to delude him into believing that his interests are at odds with those of the employer. Beyond his endeavours in social affairs, Mackay was co-founder of the International Colonial Institute and of the Netherland Line.

== Political career in the Netherlands ==
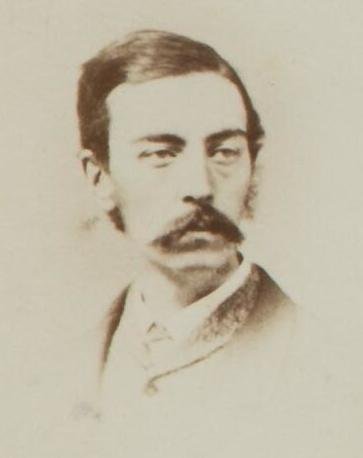
Mackay as a Dutch member of parliament

The Mackay family was one among multiple aristocratic families inspired by the Réveil, and Mackay's father had sided with the confessional anti-revolutionaries in parliament. Despite this background as well as his personal religious conviction, Donald Mackay had come into contact with liberal and progressive ideas in Leiden, and these liberal convictions had been reinforced by his time in London. As a liberal candidate, he contested the 1871 Dutch general election in the constituency of Tiel, which included his ancestral estate at Ophemert. He narrowly defeated the incumbent anti-revolutionary MP Theo, Count van Lynden van Sandenburg, and took office as member of parliament on 18 September 1871. He was re-elected in 1875.

In parliament, Mackay frequently spoke on colonial affairs, education, foreign affairs and judicial matters. He belonged to the more radical wing of the liberal party, and was a supporter of Samuel van Houten in his efforts to introduce social legislation. In 1871, he spoke in favour of and voted for the bill to repeal the ban on trade unions, which was passed by a narrow majority. In 1873, he delivered a speech in favour of Van Houten's bill banning child labour, drawing on his experience in England and citing British statesmen such as Anthony Ashley-Cooper, 7th Earl of Shaftesbury and A. J. Mundella.

According to the historian Pieter Geyl, "Mackay was an active member of parliament and spoke knowledgeably on a wide range of subjects. He was no great orator, though he was a good speaker, and a certain measured dignity, combined with the evident and acknowledged integrity of his character, commanded respect, whilst the thoroughness of his preparation and the breadth of his knowledge always made it worthwhile to listen to him." Mackay was a well-known figure in The Hague thanks to his wide-ranging intellectual interests. He was also a welcome guest at court, at least with Queen Sophie, who had a keen appreciation for intellectual culture.

== Political career in the United Kingdom ==
Lord Reay succeeded his father in 1876 and was naturalised as a British subject in 1877. He was created Baron Reay, of Durness in the County of Sutherland, in the Peerage of the United Kingdom, in 1881. In 1885 he was appointed Governor of Bombay, a post he held until 1890. He was appointed a Knight Grand Commander of the Most Eminent Order of the Indian Empire in 1887 and a Knight Grand Commander of the Most Exalted Order of the Star of India in 1890. After his return to Britain he served as Under-Secretary of State for India between 1894 and 1895 in Lord Rosebery Liberal administration. He was also a British delegate at the Second Peace Conference which led to the signing of the Hague Convention 1907. Other British delegates included Ernest Satow and Eyre Crowe.

Perhaps his most memorable contribution to politics was during the crisis over the People's Budget of 1909–10, where the House of Lords, violating a convention going back more than 200 years, rejected the Budget. Reay strongly opposed this act, and gave the memorable warning: "Oligarchies are seldom destroyed and more frequently commit suicide".

== Other public appointments ==
Apart from his political and administrative career Lord Reay was Rector of St Andrews University from 1884 to 1886, Chairman of the London School Board (1897–1904), President of the Royal Asiatic Society (1893–1921) and University College, London, and the first President of the British Academy from 1902 to 1907. He was also Lord Lieutenant of Roxburghshire from 1892 to 1918 and served as President of the first day of the 1882 Co-operative Congress. He was sworn of the Privy Council in 1906 and made a Knight of the Thistle in 1911.

He received an honorary doctorate (LL.D) from the University of Glasgow during their 450th jubilee celebrations in June 1901.

He remained in contact with the Dutch community and attended the reception and spoke with the famous Dutch writer Louis Couperus (1863–1923) on the occasion of his visit to London in June 1921, being invited by the Dutch ambassador in London, René de Marees van Swinderen (1860–1955), and which visit was mainly organised by his translator Alexander Teixeira de Mattos (1865–1921).

== Family ==
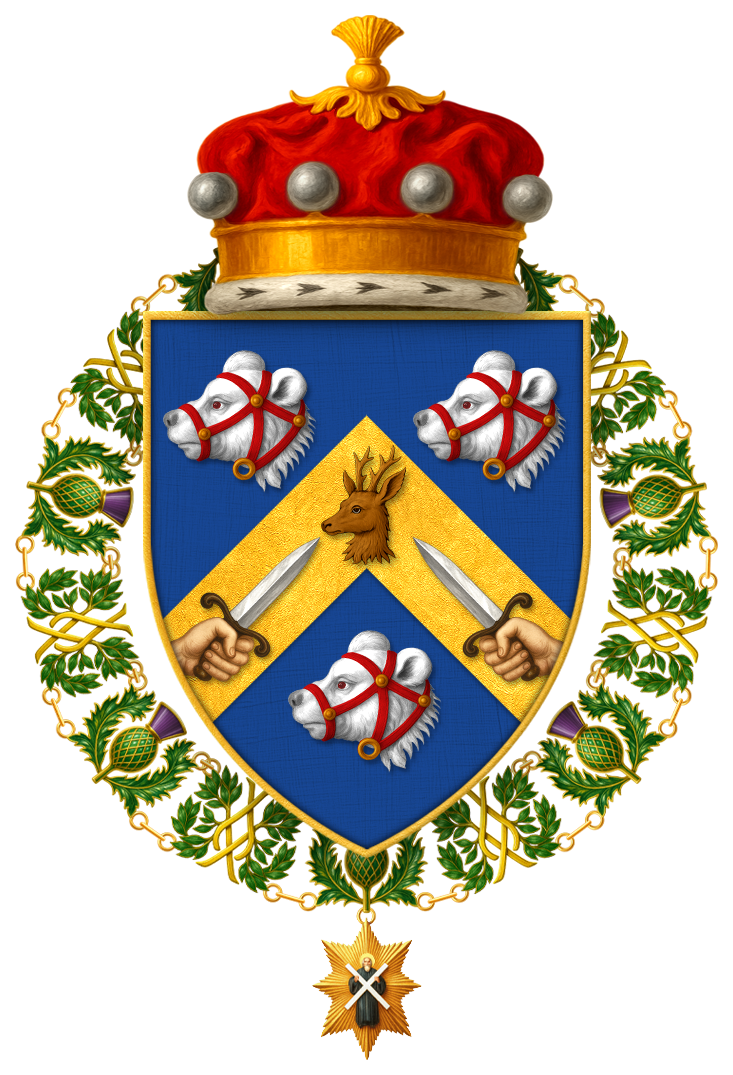
Shield of Arms of Donald James Mackay, 1st Baron Reay, 11th Lord Reay, KT, GCSI, GCIE, PC, FBA, JP, DL

Lord Reay married Fanny Georgiana Jane, daughter of Richard Hasler, of Aldingbourne, Sussex, in 1877. They had no children. He died in August 1921, aged 81. On his death the barony of 1881 became extinct while he was succeeded in the Scottish title by his cousin Eric baron Mackay (1870–1921) who was succeeded only three months later by his son Sir Aeneas Alexander baron Mackay (1905–1963), 13th Lord Reay, member of the House of Lords (1955–1959).

Political offices
Preceded by George W. E. Russell	Under-Secretary of State for India; 1894–1895	Succeeded by The Earl of Onslow
Government offices
Preceded by Sir James Fergusson	Governor of Bombay; 1885–1890	Succeeded by The Lord Harris
Preceded by The Marquess of Londonderry	Chairman of the London School Board; 1897–1904	Board abolished
Honorary titles
Preceded by The Duke of Roxburghe	Lord Lieutenant of Roxburghshire; 1892–1918	Succeeded by The Duke of Roxburghe
Academic offices
Preceded by Sir Theodore Martin	Rector of the University of St Andrews; 1884–1886	Succeeded by Arthur Balfour
Peerage of Scotland
Preceded by Aeneas Mackay	Lord Reay; 1876–1921	Succeeded by Eric Mackay
Peerage of the United Kingdom
New creation	Baron Reay; 1881–1921	Extinct
Dutch nobility
Preceded by Aeneas Mackay	Baron Mackay; 1839–1921	Succeeded by Eric Mackay
