= HNLMS Gelderland =

HNLMS Gelderland (Dutch: Hr.Ms. or Zr.Ms. Gelderland) may refer to the following ships of the Royal Netherlands Navy:

- HNLMS Gelderland (1898), a Holland-class protected cruiser
- HNLMS Gelderland (D811), a Holland-class destroyer
