= Willem Jozef Andreas Jonckbloet =

Dutch historian (1817–1885)

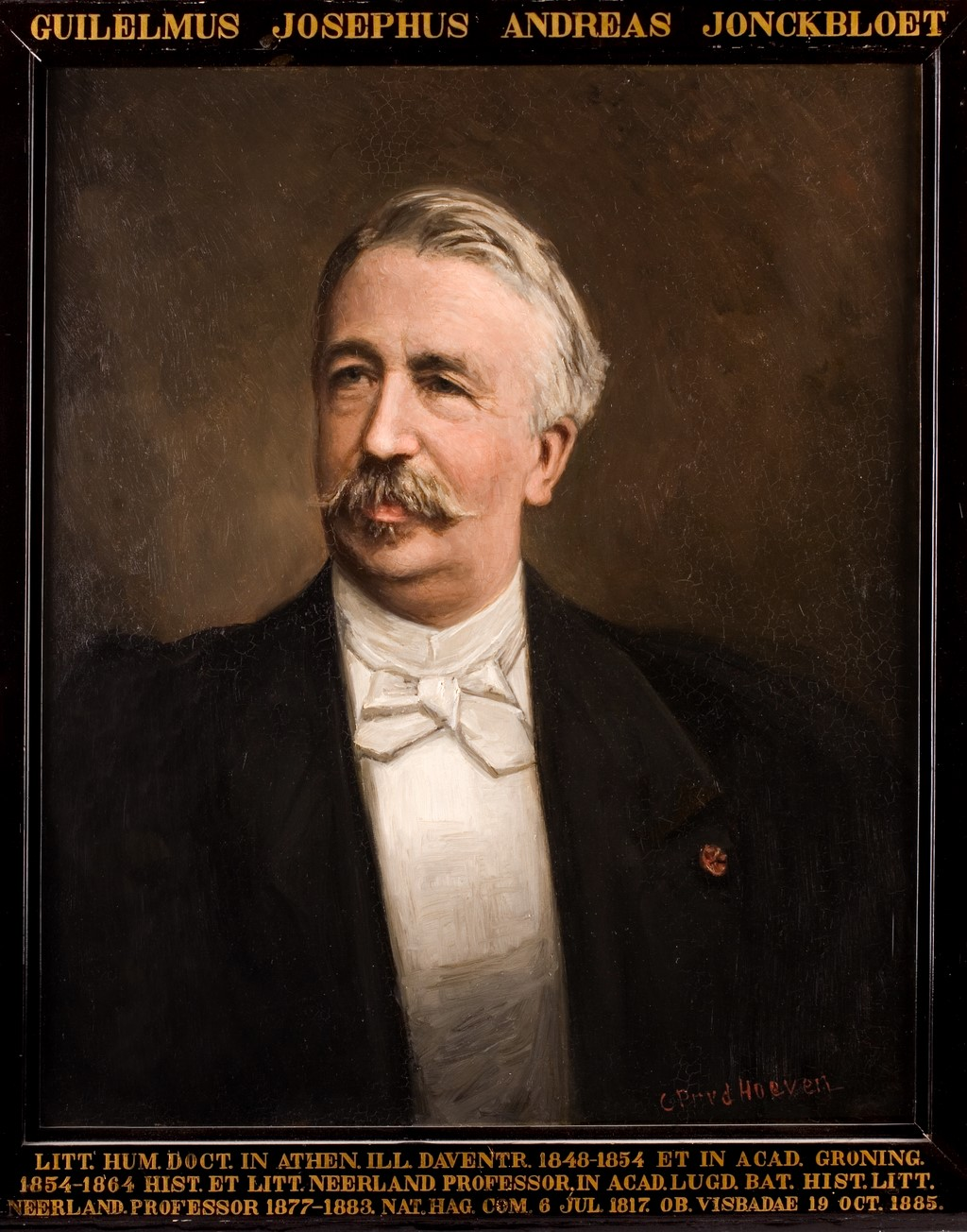
W.J.A. Jonckbloet

Willem Jozef Andreas Jonckbloet (6 July 1817, The Hague – 19 October 1885, Wiesbaden) was a Dutch historian, best known for work on medieval poetry.

From 1835 he was a student at the University of Leiden. After pursuing medicine and law, he turned to Low German literature. From 1847 at Deventer, he became a professor at Leiden in 1878.

In 1855 he became member of the Royal Netherlands Academy of Arts and Sciences.

== Works ==
- Geschiedenis der middennederlandsche dichtkunst (Amsterdam 1851-55, 3 Bde.)
- Étude sur le roman de Renart (Groningen 1863)
- Geschiedenis der Nederlandsche letterkunde (Groningen 1868-70; Bde.)

House of Representatives of the Netherlands
New district	Member for Winschoten; 1864–1877	Succeeded by Hendrik Goeman Borgesius
