= Huygens Institute for the History of the Netherlands =

Dutch research institute

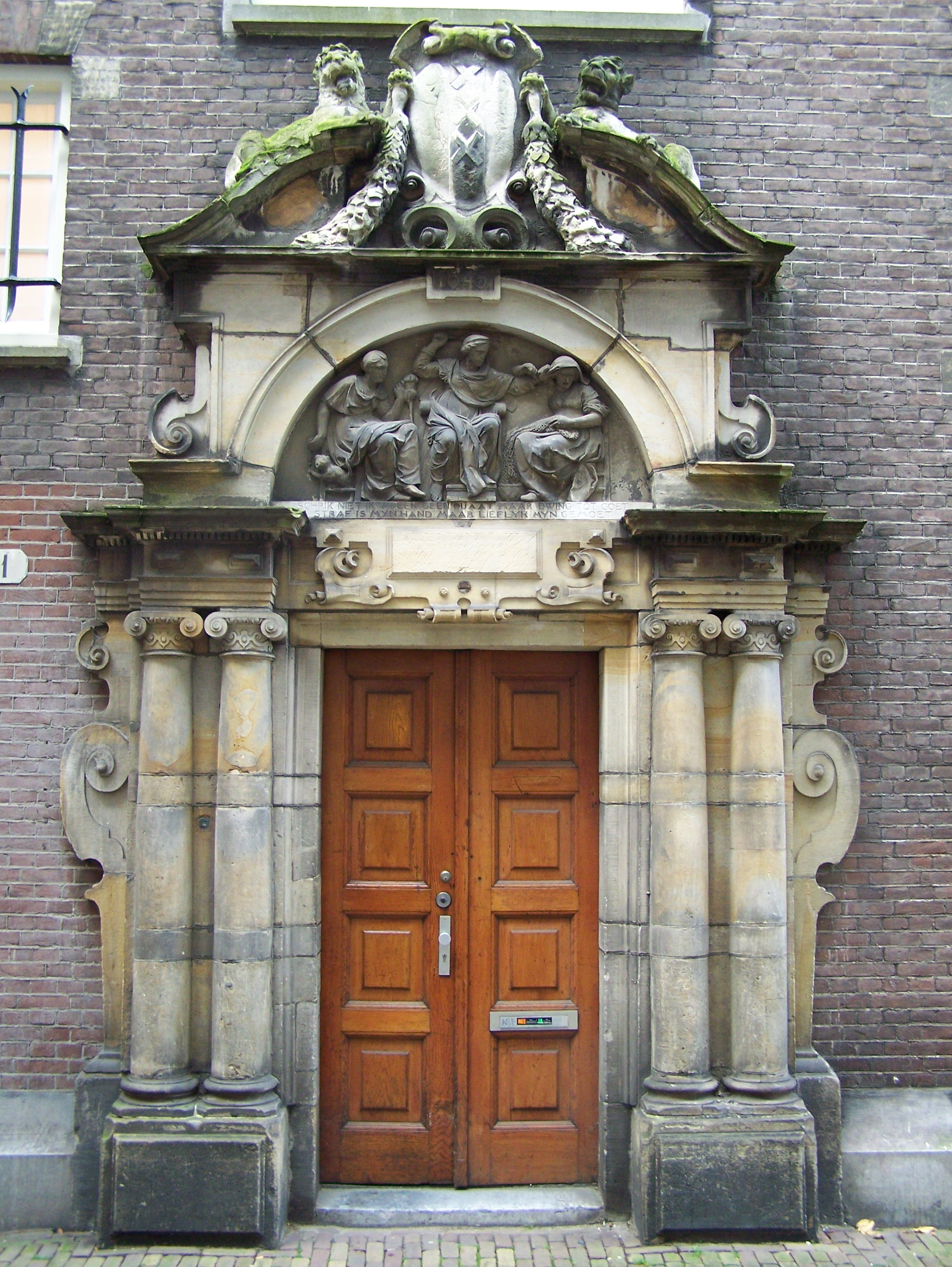
Spinhuis (Amsterdam)

The Huygens Institute for the History of the Netherlands was formed on January 1, 2011, through a merger of the Institute of Dutch History (Dutch: Instituut voor Nederlandse Geschiedenis, ING) a research institute of the Netherlands Organisation for Scientific Research, and the Huygens Instituut of the Royal Netherlands Academy of Arts and Sciences (founded in 1808). The institute is located in Amsterdam, Netherlands, in the Spinhuis building.

The institute is made up of three thematically oriented sections: one for the study of political and institutional history, one for the study of the history of science, and a third one for the study of literature. The first section dates back to 1902, when it was established as the "Commissie van Advies voor de 's Rijks Geschiedkundige Publicatien" (Advisory Commission for Publications in the History of the Empire), under the directorship of the historian Herman Theodoor Colenbrander.

Huygens ING researches texts and sources from the past with the aid of new methods and techniques from the digital humanities. The Institute champions innovation in research methodology, as well as a better comprehension of Dutch culture and history among a broad public.

The institute employs around a hundred researchers, assistants, programmers and auxiliary staff.

== Historici.nl ==
Historici.nl is an independent website about Dutch history for historians and the general public. The platform is supported by Huygens Institute for the History of the Netherlands and the Royal Netherlands Historical Society. The website publishes old and new resources for history scholars that would remain otherwise unavailable for the public. The themes available are on the history of science, literature, humanities and political institutions of the Netherlands.
