= Willem van der Kaay =

Dutch judge and politician

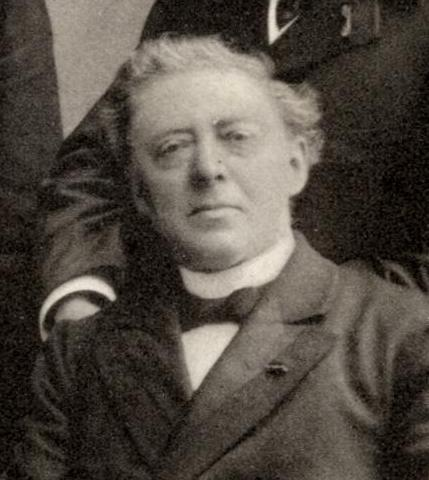

Personal details
- Born: Willem van der Kaaij; 5 May 1831 Alkmaar, Netherlands
- Died: 29 July 1918 (aged 87) The Hague, Netherlands
- Occupation: judge, politician

Willem van der Kaay (originally van der Kaaij) (5 May 1831 – 29 July 1918) was a Dutch judge and liberal politician. He was a member of the House of Representatives for Alkmaar from 1875 to 1894, and served as Minister of Justice in Joan Röell's cabinet from 1874 to 1879.

House of Representatives of the Netherlands
| Preceded by Cornelis van Foreest | Member for Alkmaar; 1875–1894; With: Jacob Leonard de Bruyn Kops 1875–1887; Isaäc Abraham Levy 1887–1888 | Succeeded by Adrianus Petrus de Lange |
Political offices
| Preceded by Hendrik Jan Smidt | Minister of Justice; 1894–1897 | Succeeded by Pieter Cort van der Linden |
