= Jacob Leonard de Bruyn Kops =

Dutch politician

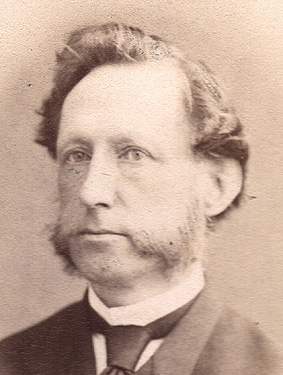
- Born: Jacob Leonard de Bruyn Kops; 22 December 1822; Haarlem, Netherlands
- Died: 1 October 1887 (aged 64); The Hague, Netherlands
- Occupations: Politician and economist

Jacob Leonard de Bruyn Kops (Haarlem, 22 December 1822 - The Hague, 1 October 1887), was a Dutch liberal economist, politician, and professor in political economy and administrative law at the Delft University of Technology.

== Biography ==
De Bruyn Kops was the son of Cornelis Johan de Bruyn Kops (1791-1858) and Maria Constance Françoise de Bosset (1794-1879). From 1840 to 1847, he studied law at Leiden University, completing his PhD there. During this time he befriended Johannes Brand the future president of the Orange Free State and the future Cape judge Egidius Benedictus Watermeyer. After graduating he worked as an advocate, and from 1851 to 1864, as an official at the Netherlands Ministry of Finance. From 1864 to 1868, he was professor of political economy and administrative law at the Delft University of Technology (then known as the Delft Polytechnic School).

From 1868 to 1884, he was a member of the Netherlands House of Representatives representing Alkmaar. He was a liberal and supporter of Jan Kappeyne van de Coppello. In the House of Representatives he spoke on topics related to trade, transport, and industry. He also supported the construction of public housing. From 1880 to 1887, he was the oldest member of the House of Representatives and on several occasions chaired the chamber on Prinsjesdag, the annual Dutch speech from the throne.

He wrote a letter of recommendation to Free State president Johannes Brand on behalf of Hendrik Pieter Nicolaas Muller who became consul and later consul-general to the Orange Free State.

As economist he was especially noted as the founder and editor of the Dutch publication De Economist. He authored a textbook on economics and was co-founder of the Netherlands Royal Association for Economics.
