= Soeria Atmadja =

Regent of Sumedang (1851–1921)

Pangeran Adipati Aria Soeria Atmadja
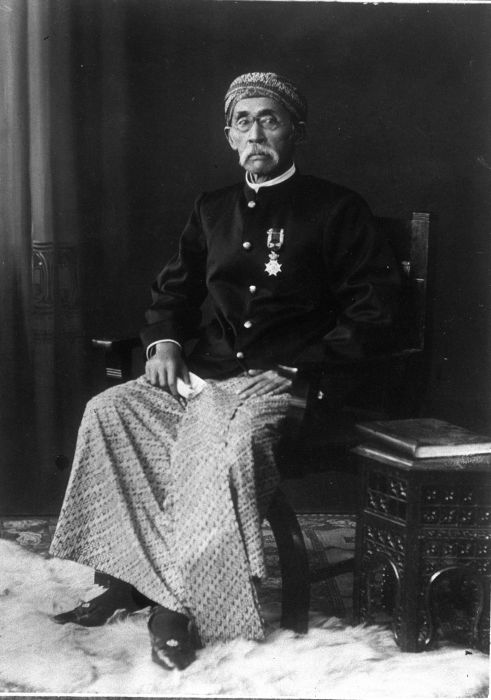

Regent of Sumedang
- In office 30 December 1882 – 5 May 1919
- Governors-General: Frederik s'Jacob; Otto van Rees; Cornelis Pijnacker Hordijk; Carel Herman Aart van der Wijck; Willem Rooseboom; Johannes Benedictus van Heutsz; Alexander Willem Frederik Idenburg; Johan Paul van Limburg Stirum
- Preceded by: Soeria Koesoemah Adinata
- Succeeded by: Aria Koesoemahdilaga

Personal details
- Born: Sadeli; 11 January 1851 Sumedang, Dutch East Indies
- Died: 1 June 1921 (aged 70) Mecca, Kingdom of Hijaz
- Parent: Soeria Koesoemah Adinata
- Relatives: Mochamad Singer (nephew)

Prince Adipati Aria Soeria Atmadja (11 January 1851 – 1 June 1921) was the 29th Regent of Sumedang, serving from 1883 to 1919. He was the last Regent of Sumedang to hold the title of Pangeran (Prince). Born with the name Sadeli, Soeria spent his childhood learning morals and religion. During his teenage years, he undertook an apprenticeship and studied languages. After completing his apprenticeship, he began his career as a kaliwon. He then served as the Wedana (district chieftain) of Ciawi. After that, he held the position of Patih (Vicegerent) of Sukapura.

On 30 December 1882, Soeria was appointed as the Regent of Sumedang, replacing his father who had died, and was officially inaugurated on 31 January 1883. During his tenure as Regent, he was known for frequently making impromptu visits to local areas (blusukan). Under his leadership, Sumedang saw progress in agriculture, animal husbandry, the economy, healthcare, infrastructure, and the arts. Due to his achievements, he received awards from the Dutch East Indies government and also served as the coordinator of regents in the Priangan region.

Soeria decided to resign as Regent of Sumedang in 1919 because he wished to retire. After stepping down, he spent his time in Sindang Taman. In 1921, he traveled to Mecca to perform the Hajj. However, he died upon arriving in Mecca and was buried in Jannatul mu'alla. In recognition of his achievements during his tenure as regent, the Dutch East Indies government erected a monument to commemorate his services.

== Early life and family ==
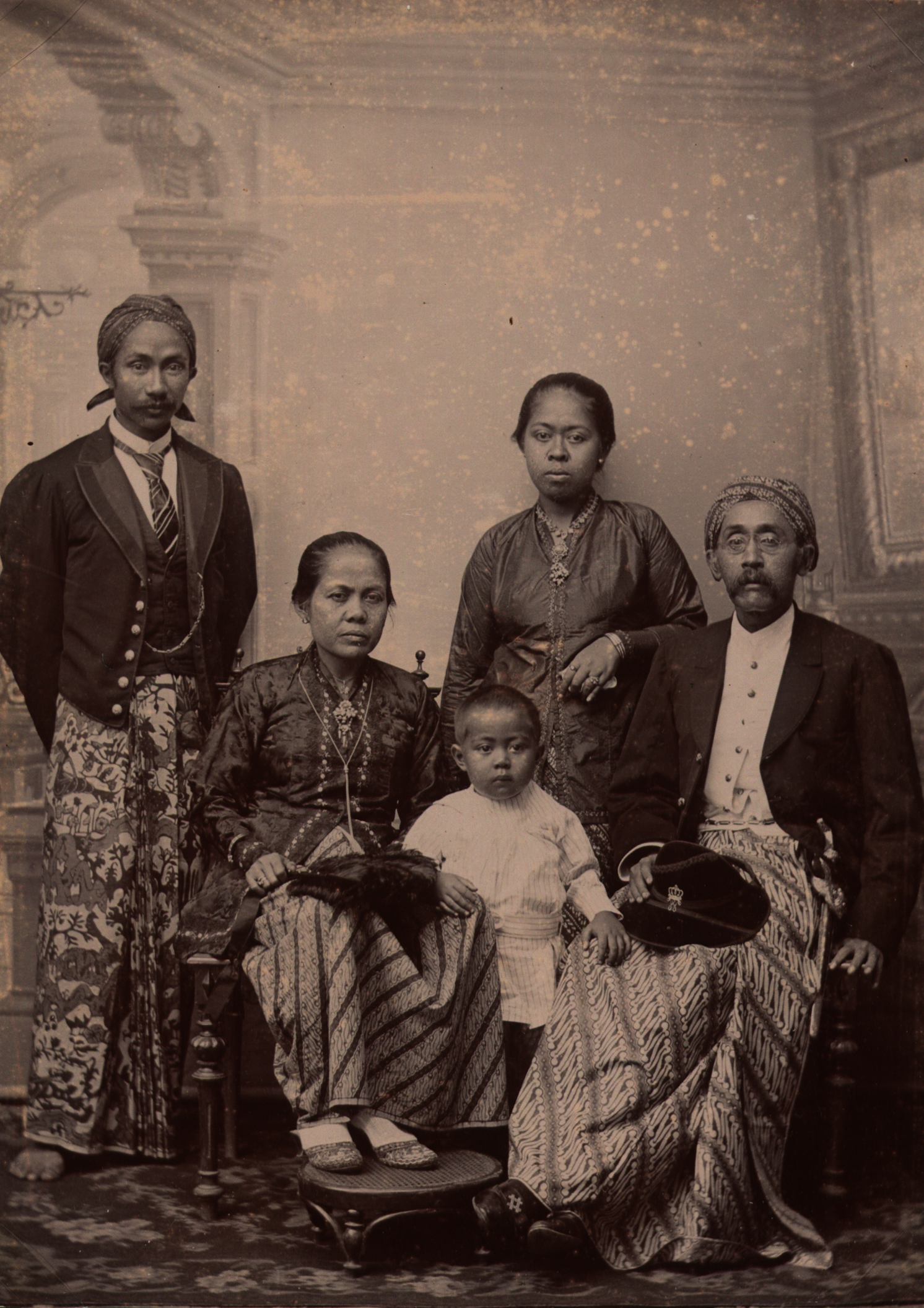
Soeria Atmadja's family

Raden Sadeli was born in Sumedang on 11 January 1851 and was the fourth child of Pangeran Aria Soeria Koesoemah Adinata, who was the Regent of Sumedang, and Raden Ajoe Ratnaningrat. During his childhood, his father taught him about morals. At the age of eight, Soeria studied Islam under a cleric named K.H. Asyrofudin. Then, at the age of 14, he began an apprenticeship, during which he became fluent in foreign languages such as English, French, and Dutch. He was also known to be shy around women. Soeria married Raden Ajoe Radja Ningroem, who was also the granddaughter of Raden Adipati Aria Adiwidjadja. He had one daughter named Raden Ajoe Djogdjainten Djoebaedah.

== Early career ==
After completing his apprenticeship, Sadeli obtained his first job as a kaliwon (Note: Kaliwon is a rural district leader whose position is below of a regent.) in 1869. Two years later, he was appointed as wedana in Ciawi on 7 February 1871 and served for four years. While serving as Wedana of Ciawi, Sadeli changed his name to Soeria Atmadja, which means "The great descendant of Soeria." This name change was intended to demonstrate his readiness to take on responsibilities as a government bureaucrat and to affirm his legitimacy as a descendant of the distinguished and respected regents of Sumedang.

On 29 November 1875, Soeria assumed the position of patih of the Sukapura Regency. During his tenure as patih in Sukapura, he donated his land in Tasikmalaya for the construction of the Great Mosque of Tasikmalaya and the Cigalontang Islamic Boarding School (pesantren). He was bestowed the title Rangga (Note: Rangga is a title given to a bureaucrat whose position is below that of a regent.) on 13 March 1879, in recognition of his dedication to the development of Islam and his outstanding achievements while serving as Patih of Sukapura.

== Regent of Sumedang ==
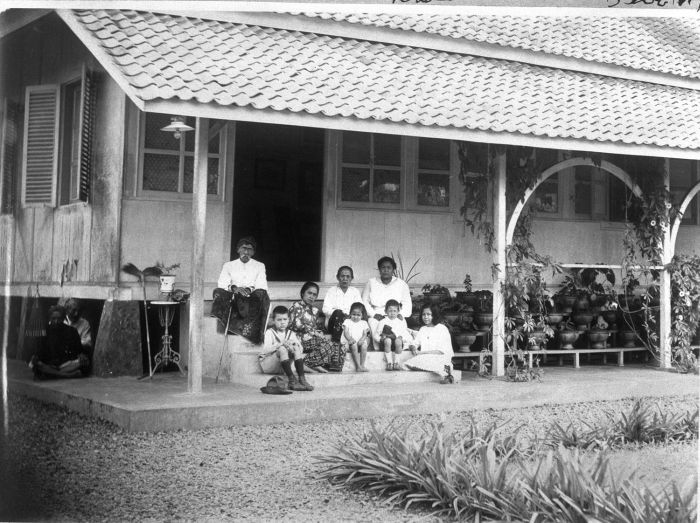
Soeria with his family and servants at his home

After the death of Soeria Koesoemah Adinata, there were two candidates for the position of Regent of Sumedang: Raden Demang Somanagara and Soeria. Among the two, Soeria was chosen as Regent of Sumedang because he met the requirements set by the Dutch East Indies government. He was appointed on 30 December 1882, and was officially inaugurated as Regent of Sumedang on 31 January 1883. Upon becoming regent, he was granted the title tumenggung.

Soeria served as the Regent of Sumedang until 5 May 1919, when he decided to resign due to old age. The position of regent was then passed on to his younger brother, Aria Koesomahdilaga. During his time as regent, Soeria Atmadja was known for his impromptu visit (blusukan) to remote areas to observe the condition of his people firsthand. This practice was inspired by the patrols often carried out by Umar bin Khattab and Muhammad.

On 31 August 1898, Soeria received a title promotion from Tumenggung to Adipati. He later received the songsong kuning (yellow umbrella) (Note: Songsong kuning, also known as the yellow umbrella, is a ceremonial umbrella bestowed by the Dutch East Indies government as a symbol of honor for outstanding regents.) honour on 26 August 1905, in recognition of his achievements in bringing prosperity to the people of Sumedang. By obtaining the yellow umbrella, Soeria was granted an additional official title, Aria, on 29 August 1905. On 26 August 1910, the Dutch East Indies government appointed Soeria as the coordinator of regents in the Parahyangan region, and his noble title was elevated from Raden to Pangeran (Prince). Along with this title promotion, Soeria was once again honored by the Dutch East Indies government—this time with the songsong emas (golden umbrella).

=== Development ===
In 1898, Soeria established the Bank Priyayi in Sumedang to assist the local people affected by loan shark practices. This bank later became the forerunner of Bank Rakyat Indonesia (BRI). The bank's capital was collected by setting aside a percentage of the salaries of civil servants in Sumedang. Three years later, Bank Priyayi changed its name to Afdeeling Bank (Regional Bank). In its operations, the Regional Bank provided credit to its members to protect them from falling into debt traps with moneylenders. In 1915, he also founded a village bank to support small farmers.

In 1908, he built the lower part of the Cadas Pangeran road connecting Bandung and Sumedang, as well as a telephone office to facilitate communication. Additionally, he constructed assistant wedana residences in each kawedanan (district) using his funds. At the beginning of the 20th century, the people of Sumedang showed an interest in horse racing. He imported horses from Sumba to Sumedang for transportation and horse racing purposes, which was participated in by the menak (Sundanese nobles), prompting him to build a horse racing track. In the early 20th century, Sumedang frequently held horse racing events.

To improve security and order, security posts were built from the village level up to the kawedanan level. Each security post was required to be equipped with bamboo containers filled with water, sand, and other equipment as a precautionary measure against fires. Every week, the guards of the security posts were required to report the activities of their posts at weekly meetings supervised by Soeria. Around 138 security posts were built at the village level.

=== Government ===
During his tenure, schools began to be established in Sumedang, and in 1907, village schools with a three-year study period became available. Seven years later, secondary schools were established in Sumedang for outstanding village school students, with the same length of study. In 1915, the first Hollandsch-Inlandsche School was founded in Sumedang, and eventually, such schools were established in every district in Sumedang, totaling up to 20 schools. Additionally, he liked to give awards to outstanding students and to teachers to support their welfare.

To prevent the spread of the plague that was occurring in Indonesia at the time, he carried out rat extermination efforts. He also participated in weekly meetings (rapat minggon) at the sub-district level to synchronize data he had, such as birth, death, and infectious disease records. Additionally, he implemented smallpox immunization programs in villages for children and infants, carried out by Javanese doctors—doctors who had graduated from medical schools during the Dutch East Indies period. Furthermore, he established a public health clinic in Cipanas Conggeang.

=== Agriculture and the environment ===
Due to Sumedang’s hilly geography, landslides posed a threat to its residents. To address this issue, Soeria carried out reforestation on barren lands and implemented policies to protect forbidden or closed forests to ensure their preservation. Additionally, he encouraged the people of Sumedang living along roadsides to plant trees whose wood could be used for building bridges and structures, and whose roots were expected to help retain water, which could prevent erosion. The steep mountain slopes and hills in Sumedang made the area less suitable for farming. To overcome this problem, Soeria initiated the construction of terraced rice fields in the hilly regions. Terraced fields were built throughout Sumedang, and this initiative increased agricultural yields. The terracing method was also expected to reduce erosion. Besides plant conservation efforts, he urged the people to protect Asian palm civet (luwak) to help increase the production of sugar palm. Soeria also established regulations regarding the size of fishing nets to prevent catching small fish, banned the use of poison, and regulated the timing and locations for fishing to ensure the sustainability of freshwater fish production.

In addition, he distributed the book Mitra Nu Tani to village chiefs and transformed areas that were previously covered with cogongrass into potato and vegetable fields. Soeria also imported plant seedlings from Indramayu and coconut seedlings from Central Java and Bali to improve agricultural yields. He undertook irrigation development, particularly in the Ujungjaya, and built rice barns. To prevent crop failure, a rat extermination program was carried out. Moreover, he provided land for gardening and rice fields to people from Indramayu who had migrated to Sumedang due to famine. In 1886, Soeria lobbied the Dutch East Indies government to exempt several poor villages from the obligation to plant coffee, and this request was granted.

To support agricultural development, Soeria established an agricultural school Landbouwschool Bojongseungit in 1913 on a 4.3-hectare land that he donated. After the school was inaugurated, Soeria donated 3,000 guilders as the school’s initial capital. He also instructed the agricultural students to plant crops whose yields he would purchase. After buying the produce, he distributed the seeds to the people. This agricultural school is now known as Winaya Mukti University.

Because cow manure fertilizer was considered quite effective, he imported cattle from Madura and Bengal to Sumedang. As a result of this effort, livestock farming in Sumedang experienced the second-fastest growth in the Priangan after Bandung Regency, leading farmers to prefer cows over buffaloes as their working animals. Additionally, he imported Ongole cattle from Sumba to improve the livestock sector. The Ongole cattle were distributed to selected villagers and were used not only as livestock but also for plowing rice fields. Due to this import policy, the number of livestock in Sumedang increased from 1,000 animals in 1883 to 5,400 in 1918. He became one of the founders of an organization called the Association for the Development of Livestock in the Dutch East Indies on 28 May 1906. The Dutch East Indies government also appointed Soeria and Raden Mas Tumenggung Ario Koesoemodipoetro, the Regent of Panarukan, as members of a committee in November 1902 to investigate the causes of declining prosperity on Java and Madura.

=== Other activities ===
Soeria paid attention to tayub dance, gamelan degung, and vocal arts. As a reflection of his interest in music, Soeria composed a song titled Lagu Sonteng. This song was not allowed to be played by just anyone, and it was believed that anyone who dared to play it would become possessed. During his leadership, the gamelan degung buhun was performed every Sunday at 8 a.m. Soeria also contributed to the development of Tahu sumedang (Sumedang tofu). During a work visit to Tegalkalong, he smelled a delicious aroma coming from Ong Boen Keng's small shop. He immediately approached the shop and found that the aroma came from tofu being fried by Ong. Soeria tasted the tofu and said it would sell well because it was delicious. Since his visit, Sumedang tofu, known as "Tahu Bungkeng," experienced increased sales and became more popular.

In 1906, the Dutch East Indies government exiled Cut Nyak Dhien to Sumedang. During her exile in Sumedang, Soeria entrusted Ahmad Sanusi to take care of Cut Nyak Dhien, who lived with Sanusi for one year. Additionally, Soeria covered all of Cut Nyak Dhien’s necessities because she refused to accept assistance from the government.

== Retirement and death ==
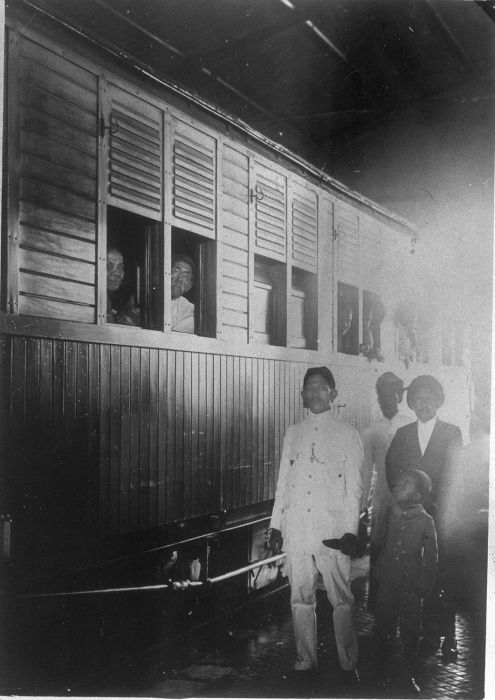
Prince Soeria Atmadja in the carriage to perform hajj pilgrimage

After no longer serving as regent, Soeria chose to spend his retirement in Sindang Taman and received an annual pension of 5,400 guilders from the government. In March 1920, De Preangerbode reported that Soeria had established a rice cooperative aimed at improving the welfare of the people of Sumedang. He also sent a letter to Johan Paul van Limburg Stirum expressing his displeasure with the Sarekat Islam, which he believed had behaved beyond limits and used the name of Islam to deceive others. He also criticized the Dutch East Indies government for allowing H.O.S. Tjokroaminoto to become a member of the Volksraad. In 1921, Soeria published a book titled Ditiung Memeh Hujan. In his book, he advised the Dutch East Indies government to provide weapons training to the people so they could be involved in efforts to defend the country from foreign attacks.

In February 1921, it was reported that Soeria and his wife would perform the Hajj. They departed from Tanjung Priok Port on 7 April. He arrived in Jeddah in deteriorating health and stayed at the Dutch Consulate for three days. After that, he traveled by car to Mecca, arriving at night with his health worsening further. He died on 1 June. News of Soeria’s death was only received by the Dutch East Indies government on 7 June 1921. The government then informed his family of his death. His body was buried in Ma’la. Soeria’s death in Mecca earned him the nickname “Prince of Mecca.”

== Awards ==
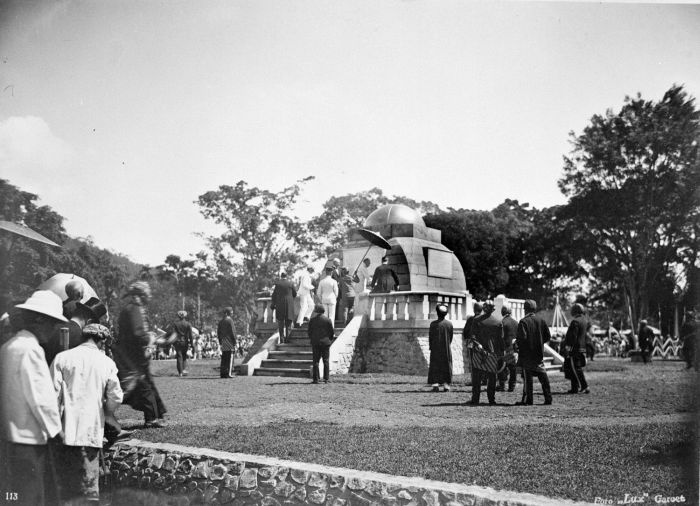
Dirck Fock inaugurated the monument commemorating Prince Soeria Atmadja.

Soeria received several awards during his tenure as regent, such as the De Groote Gouden Ster (The Great Golden Star) awarded on 21 August 1891, the Order of Oranje-Nassau (Officer) on 27 August 1903, and the Order of the Netherlands Lion (Knight) on 17 September 1918. The people of Sumedang also nicknamed Soeria the "Perfect Prince."

To commemorate Soeria’s services, the Dutch East Indies Government erected a lingga-shaped monument in the center of Sumedang town. The monument was inaugurated on 25 April 1922 by the Governor-General of the Dutch East Indies, Dirk Fock. The Bandung city government also renamed a street located in the southern part of the city, originally called Grooten Tegallegaweg, to Jalan Pangeran Sumedangweg on 23 August 1922. This street name change sparked protests from the ISDV and Sarekat Islam. They viewed the renaming as an insult since South Bandung was a stronghold of the SI movement, and Soeria opposed that movement. Nevertheless, the name Jalan Pangeran Sumedangweg was retained until 1950, when the city government decided to change it to Jalan Telaga.

In 2024, a haul (death commemoration) was held to mark the 105th anniversary of Prince Soeria Atmadja’s death. A hybrid orchid resulting from a cross between Dendrobium bigibbum and Dendrobium Jaq-Hawaii was named after Soeria Atmadja, Dendrobium Aria Soeria Atmadja. This orchid was officially registered with the RHS on 23 June 2025.

== Works ==
- Ditioeng Méméh Hoejan (Prepare an umbrella before the rain). 1921 - a book containing Soeria Atmadja's views and opinions, Including support for arming and training local inhabitants to help the Dutch East Indies defend against foreign attacks. His book later contributed to discussions of the Indië Weerbaar movement, particularly regarding the military training of local inhabitants.

== Bibliographies ==
=== Book ===
- Lubis, Nina Herlina (1998). Kehidupan kaum ménak Priangan, 1800-1942. Bandung: Sundanese Cultural Information Center.
- Lubis, Nina Herlina (2008). Sejarah Sumedang dari masa ke masa (PDF). Sumedang: Department of Tourism and Culture of Sumedang Regency.

=== Journals ===
- Handayani, Rahmi; Wiyanarti, Erlina; Yulifar, Leli (2019). "Rekam Jejak Pangeran Aria Soeria Atmadja (Bupati Sumedang Tahun 1883-1919)". Factum. 8 (1): 85–96. doi:10.17509/factum.v8i1.20120. Archived from the original on 24 August 2020.
- Lasmiyati, Lasmiyati (2014). "Ditioeng Memeh Hoedjan: Pemikiran Pangeran Aria Suria Atmadja dalam Memajukan Pemuda Pribumi di Sumedang (1800-1921)". Patanjala. 6 (2): 223. doi:10.30959/ptj.v6i2.196.
- Nugraha, Awaludin (2018). "Pembangunan Berkelanjutan Berbasis Moral: Pemikiran Pembangunan P.A.A. Soeria Atmadja dalam "Di Tioeng Memeh Hoedjan"". Jurnal Sejarah Citra Lekha. 3 (2): 108. doi:10.14710/jscl.v3i2.19313.
