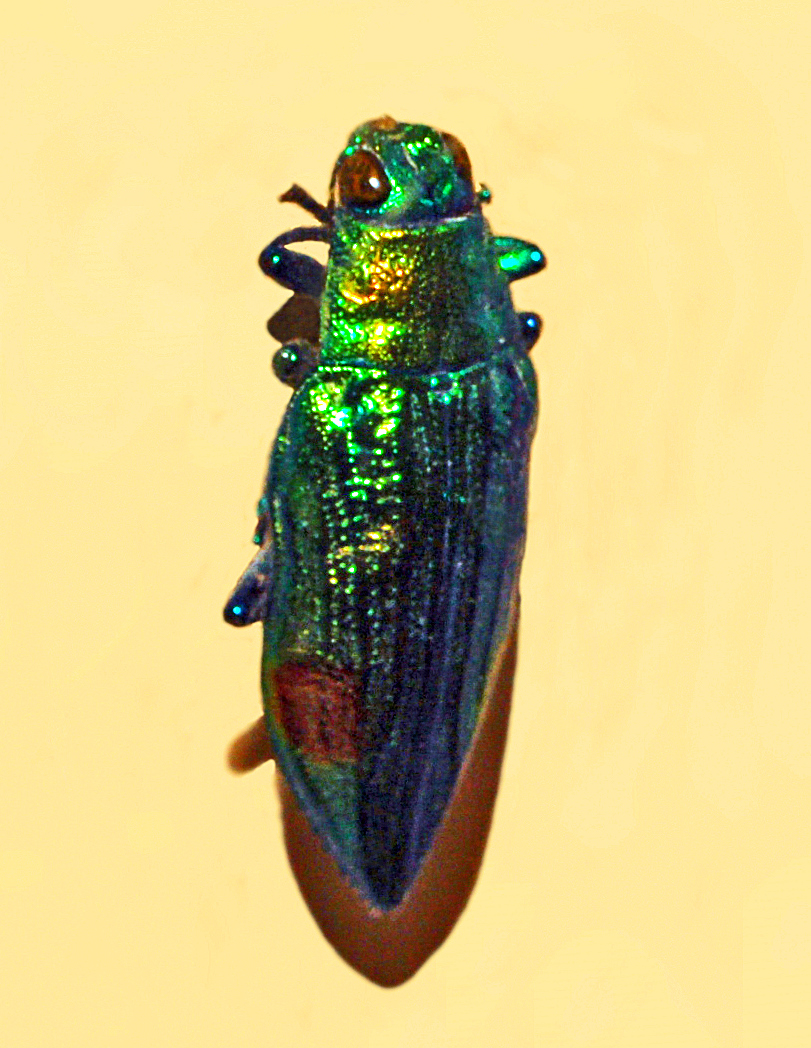
- Chrysodema swierstrae from Nias Island

Scientific classification
- Kingdom: Animalia
- Phylum: Arthropoda
- Clade: Pancrustacea
- Class: Insecta
- Order: Coleoptera
- Suborder: Polyphaga
- Infraorder: Elateriformia
- Family: Buprestidae
- Genus: Chrysodema
- Species: C. swierstrae

Binomial name
- Chrysodema swierstrae Lansberge, 1883

= Chrysodema swierstrae =

Species of beetle

Chrysodema swierstrae is a species of beetle of the Buprestidae family.

== Description ==
These beetles have a glossy surface with metallic green color.

== Distribution ==
Chrysodema swierstrae can be found in a large part of South Eastern Asia, from Malaysia and Indonesia up to Philippines.
