= Van Lansberge =

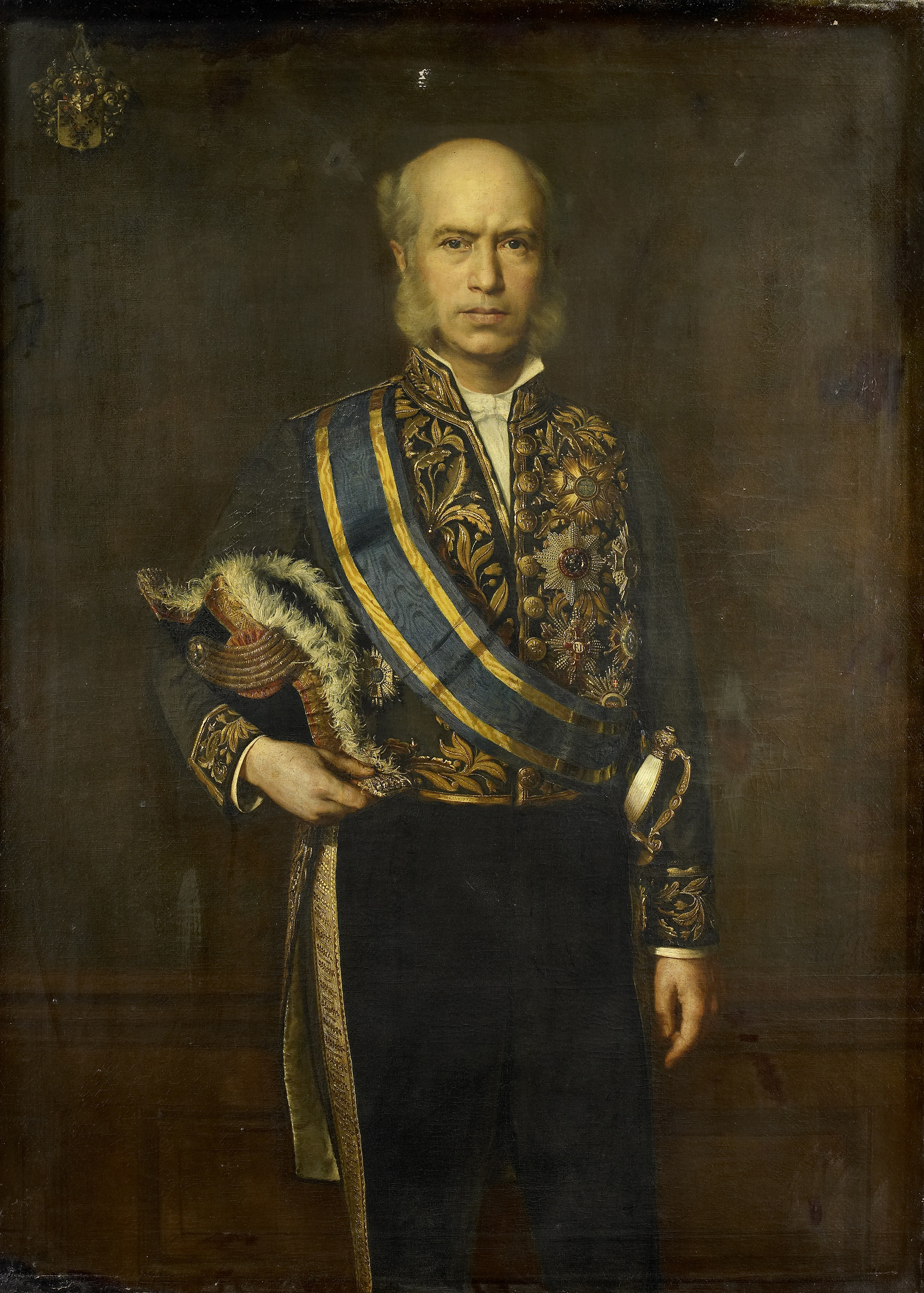
Portrait of Johan Wilhelm van Lansberge

van Lansberge is a surname. Notable people with this surname include:

- Johan Wilhelm van Lansberge (1830–1903), Dutch diplomat and entomologist
- Philippe van Lansberge (1561–1632), Flemish scientist
