= Neoserica verticalis =

Scientific classification
- Kingdom: Animalia
- Phylum: Arthropoda
- Class: Insecta
- Order: Coleoptera
- Suborder: Polyphaga
- Infraorder: Scarabaeiformia
- Family: Scarabaeidae
- Genus: Neoserica
- Species: N. verticalis

Binomial name
- Neoserica verticalis (Lansberge, 1886)

Synonyms
- Serica verticalis Lansberge, 1886; Lepiserica verticalis; Autoserica verticalis

Species of beetle

Neoserica verticalis is a species of beetle of the family Scarabaeidae. It is found in Angola.

== Description ==
Adults reach a length of about 7 mm. They have a short-oval, brown body, with faintly darkened ribs. They are densely tomentose. The legs are somewhat lighter and shinier, and the frons and pronotum are faintly darker with a greenish-blue sheen.
