= ChevoBeatz =

Surinamese-Dutch Producer (born 1992)

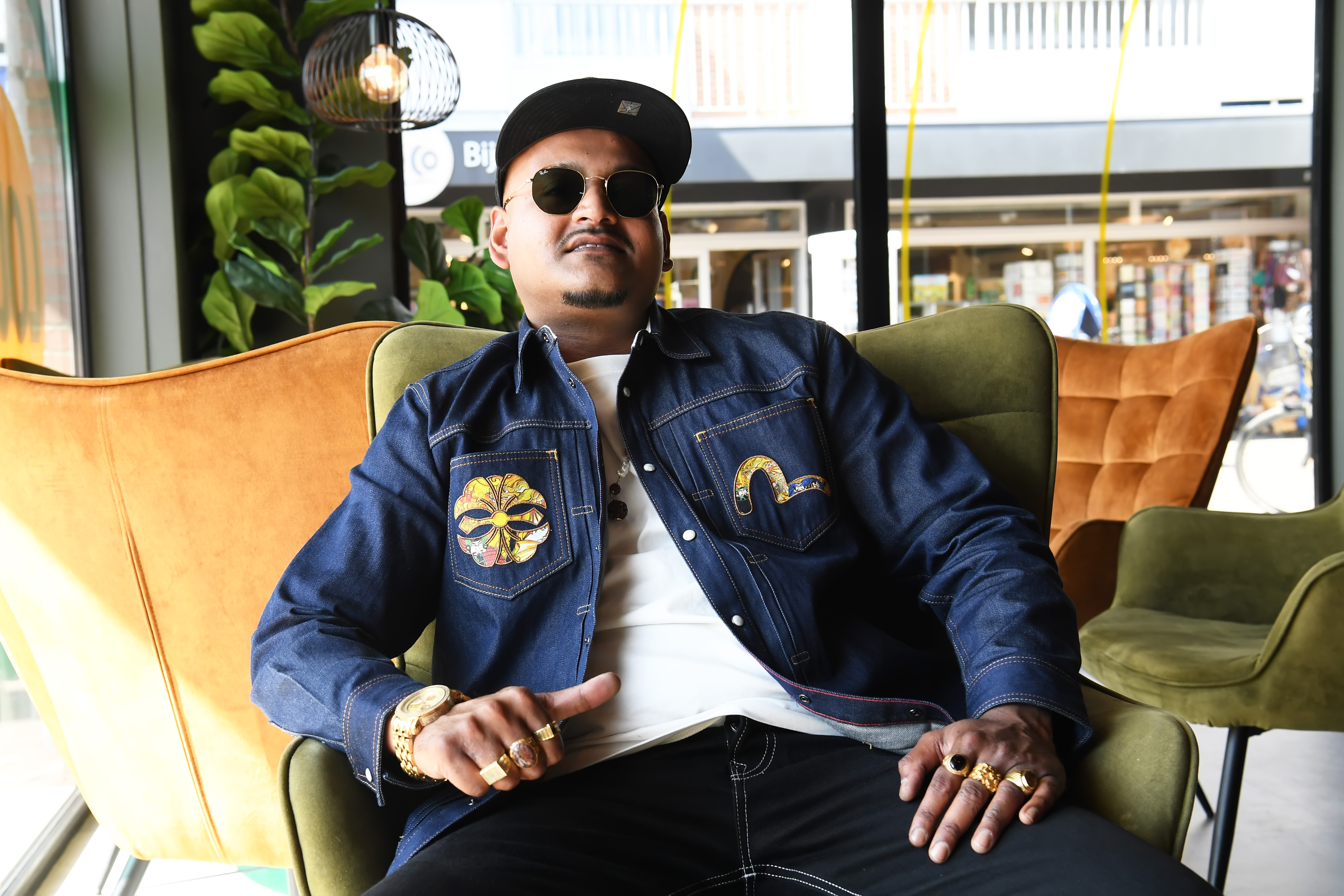
- Born: Cheville Samoedj; May 8, 1992 (age 34); Velp, Gelderland
- Other name: ChevoBeatz
- Citizenship: Dutch
- Occupations: musician; songwriter; record producer
- Years active: 2003–present
- Works: Shatta Gyal, Time's Dread
- Children: 1
- Awards: Full list
- Musical career
- Genres: Dancehall; Reggaeton; Reggae; Afrobeat; Moombahton
- Instruments: Keyboard player, Drum player, Guitar player, Bass player
- Label: ChevoProductions
- Formerly of: Shine Arnhem
- Website: chevobeatz.com

ChevoBeatz (/ʃɛvoʊbiːts/ born Cheville Samoedj May 8, 1992) is Surinamese-Dutch producer known for his song "Shatta Gyal", with Jamaican deejay FyaVerse which charted on Billboard Argentina.

== Early life ==
Samoedj was born in Velp, Netherlands, to Surinamese-Indian parents. His father, Sudesh K. Samoedj, known as Bonniac SK, was a musician, and from an early age, ChevoBeatz was exposed to music. At 11, he began playing bass guitar in his father's band, Shine, performing at various events across the Netherlands.

== Career ==
ChevoBeatz established himself as a producer in the dancehall and reggae genres. His production style blends Caribbean, African, and South American influences. He gained widespread recognition when his song "Shatta Gyal" (with FyaVerse) entered the Billboard Argentina Hot 100 chart.

In addiction to his Billboard success, "Shatta Gyal" topped the Hype TV Jamaica charts and gained further international attention when it was shared by producer Scott Storch on Instagram. His follow-up production, "Times Dread", reached #1 on the FIWI Choice Top 10.

In 2025, "Time's Dread" was nominated for Best Reggae Act at the HDP Music Awards.

== Chart singles ==
Year	Title	Peak Chart Positions		Album
Year	Title	HypeTv Jamaica	Fiwi Choice Top 10	Album
2025	Shatta Gyal (featuring FyaVerse)	1	-	
2025	Time's Dread (featuring FyaVerse)	-	1	Freedom Street Riddim

== Award and nominations ==
Year	Nominated work	Award	Result
2025	Time's Dread (featuring FyaVerse)	Best Reggae Act	Nominated

== Discography ==
Title	Year
Give Me the Herbs	2023
Shatta Gyal	2023
Harmony of Hearts	2024
Reggae on the Hills	2023
Rise Up	2023
Time's Dread	2025
Bamba	2023
Love Up	2023
Naiwe	2024
Raha Jipe	2023
Leke	
Ganja Forest feat. FyaVerse	2025
Margarita feat. FyaVerse & JahPlaka	2025
