= Aarnout Loudon =

Dutch corporate executive and politician (1936–2021)

Jonkheer Aarnout Loudon
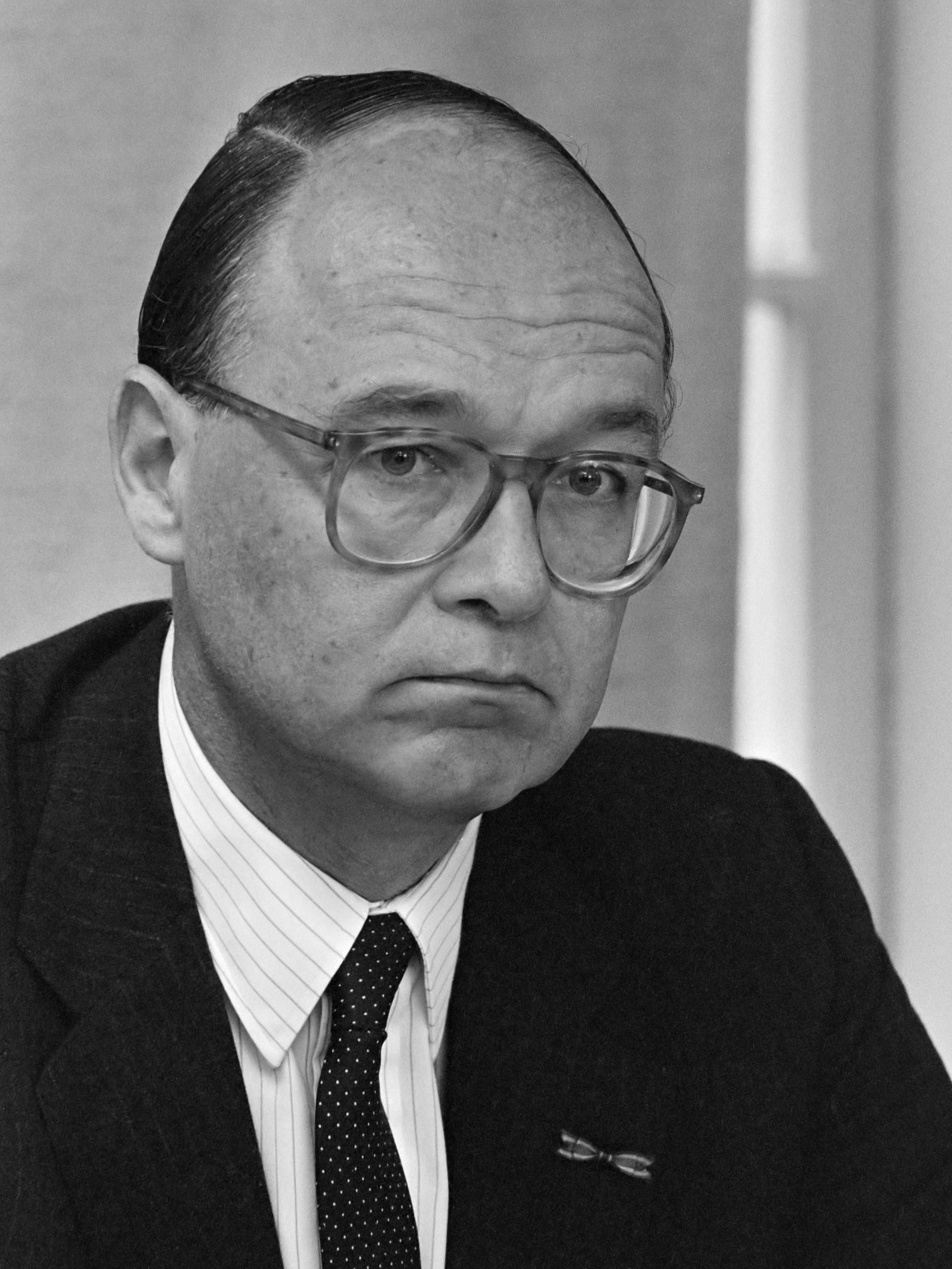
- Loudon in 1987

Member of the Senate
- In office 13 June 1995 – 7 June 1999

Personal details
- Born: Aarnout Alexander Loudon; 10 December 1936 The Hague, Netherlands
- Died: 9 September 2021 (aged 84) The Hague, Netherlands
- Party: People's Party for Freedom and Democracy
- Spouse: Thalita Boon (m. 1962)
- Children: 2
- Relatives: James Loudon (great-grandfather)
- Education: Utrecht University

Jonkheer Aarnout Alexander Loudon (Note: Dutch: [ˈaːrnʌut ˈlʌudɔn]; also spelled Aernout Loudon) (10 December 1936 – 9 September 2021) was a Dutch corporate executive and politician of the conservative-liberal People's Party for Freedom and Democracy (VVD).

Born in The Hague, he spent several years of his childhood in Japanese internment camps in the Dutch East Indies during World War II. He studied Dutch law at Utrecht University, and he began his career at Mees & Hope bank after his military service. In 1969, Loudon started working for the chemical conglomerate Akzo. He was its chief executive officer (CEO) from 1982 until 1994, when the company merged with Nobel. He served one term in the Senate between 1995 and 1999, and he sat on several supervisory boards, including those of AkzoNobel, ABN AMRO, and Royal Dutch Shell.

== Early life and education ==
Loudon was born in 1936 in The Hague into a prominent family of diplomats and entrepreneurs. He bore the predicate "jonkheer", as his family had been ennobled because of his great-grandfather James Loudon's tenure as Governor-General of the Dutch East Indies. Loudon's parents were Hugo Loudon and Henriëtte Snouck Hurgronje, and he had a younger brother called Francis.

Loudon grew up in the Dutch East Indies, where his father worked as a civil servant in the governor-general's office in Batavia. The colony was occupied by the Japanese during World War II, and his family was sent to an internment camp around Batavia in 1942. His father was split from the family later in 1942, and his mother tasked Loudon with carrying a bronze horse belonging to his father when they switched camps. His father died in September 1944 when the hell ship Jun'yō Maru was accidentally sunk by a British torpedo. Loudon has credited his mother with reducing trauma from that period, and he held on to his father's bronze horse after the war.

He attended elementary school in The Hague, and he received secondary education at the Vrijzinnig-Christelijk Lyceum starting in 1949, graduating with a gymnasium diploma. Loudon went on to study Dutch law at Utrecht University until December 1961, and he was a member of the Utrechtsch Studenten Corps. He was subsequently conscripted into the army, and he remained a reserve first lieutenant of the horse artillery until 1964.

== Career ==
=== Akzo ===
Loudon started his career in 1964 at Mees & Hope bank. He wanted to switch to a larger bank after a while, but he told that banks would not hire each other's personnel at the time. In February 1969, he switched to the finance department of Royal Salt-Organon (KZO), which merged into the chemical conglomerate Akzo that same year. He later was finance director for Astral, Akzo's coatings business in France, and he became president of Akzo Brazil in 1975. Loudon was vice chair of Akzo's board of directors starting in May 1978.

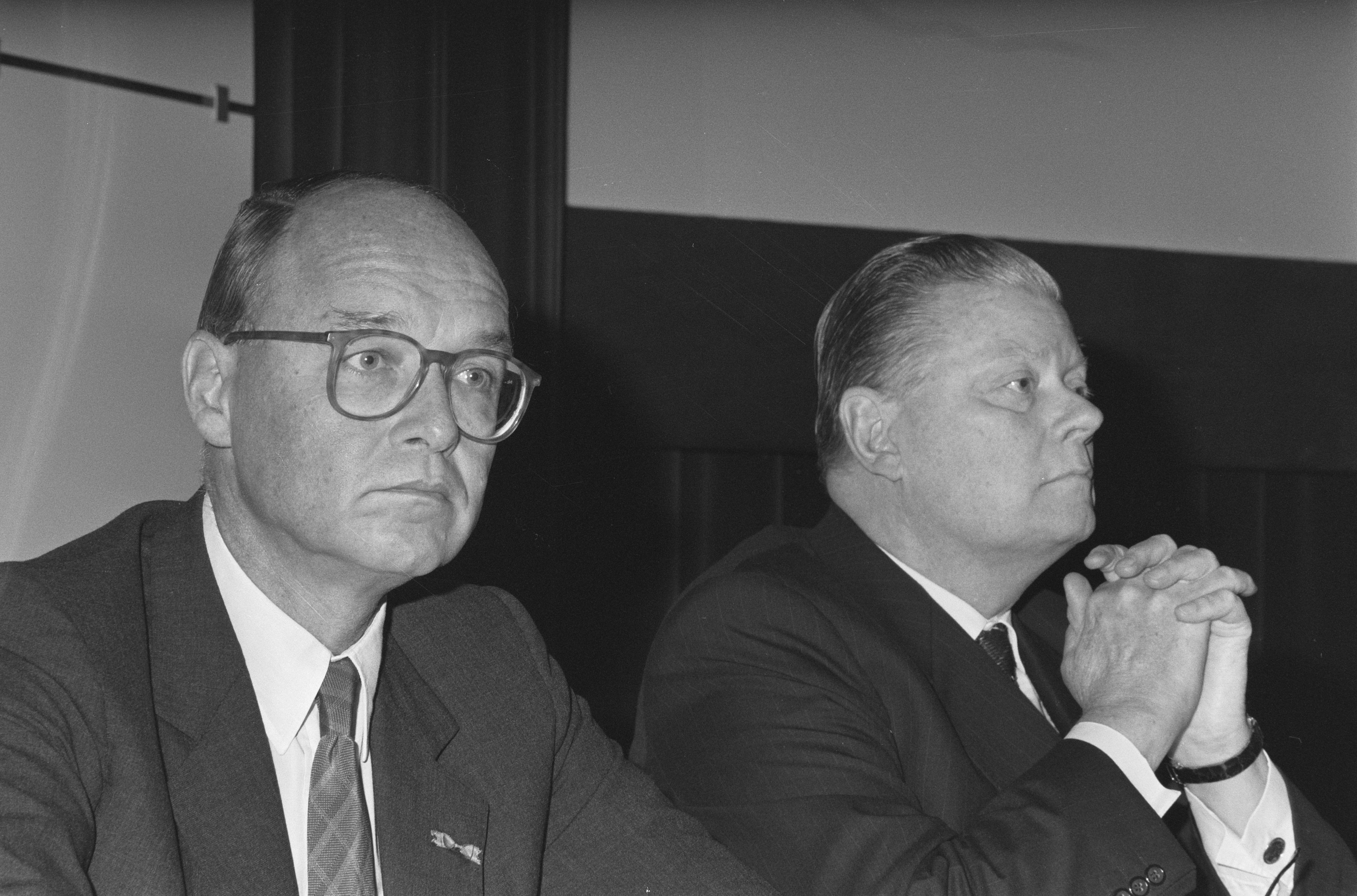
Loudon as Akzo chairman next to Anton Dreesmann in 1987

He became chairman in May 1982, when the company had 80,000 employees and was among the largest industrial companies of the Netherlands. During his tenure, Akzo grew into a major player in the international chemical sector, and its profit reached ƒ954 million in 1989, up from ƒ165 million when the took over. The company spent several billion guilders on acquisitions, and it sold off other parts including its consumer products. Its fibres business unit faced persistent issues, generating little profit despite significant investments. Loudon called the unit one of Akzo's crown jewels, and he refused to divest. He stayed on as CEO until April 1994, shortly after the company merged with the Swedish company Nobel. He hoped that the merger would unify the organisation, describing Akzo's fragmented structure—shaped by mergers and acquisitions—as its greatest weakness. His earlier attempts to create a shared company culture led to him being called "Mister Akzo", and they were sometimes discarded as "centralist". Under his leadership, a new company logo depicting a man with his arms spread was introduced in 1988.

While CEO, Loudon sat on the executive board of the Confederation of Netherlands Industry, the board of directors of IBM Europe, the supervisory boards of De Nederlandsche Bank and the Royal Netherlands Blast Furnaces and Steelworks (1992–2002), and the international councils of J.P. Morgan & Co. and Allianz. Following his tenure, he stayed on as chair of AkzoNobel's supervisory board until 2005. Along with his successor as CEO, Kees van Lede, he publicly criticised the company's leadership in 2021, saying that it should bolster the finances of its pension fund.

=== Politics and supervisory committees ===
Loudon had become a member of the People's Party for Freedom and Democracy (VVD) in July 1977. When asked in 1994 by Frits Bolkestein to join the first Kok cabinet as Minister of Finance, he declined. He was elected to the Senate in May 1995, and he was sworn in on 13 June. He was his party's spokesperson for economic affairs and the environment, and his term ended on 7 June 1999. In a 2007 interview, Loudon called Henk Kamp his favourite VVD politician, and he rejected the more populist discourse of party members Rita Verdonk and Geert Wilders.

Following his retirement from AkzoNobel, he received the nickname "emperor of supervisors" for his membership of the supervisory boards of ABN AMRO (chair; 1994–2006), Royal Dutch Shell (1997–2007), Hollandsche Beton Groep (chair; 1995–2002), Heidemij (1994–1999), and NYSE Euronext. He was also on the advisory boards of Cinven and Lehman Brothers. Loudon was the inaugural chair of the organisation committee of Veterans' Day from 2004 until 2007, and was on the supervisory board of the Royal Concertgebouw and as vice chair of Vereniging Rembrandt.

While he led the supervisory board of Hollandsche Beton Group, the body favoured a merger with Ballast Nedam. A group of activist shareholders preferred a merger with Boskalis, and the Enterprise Chamber subsequently concluded that the supervisory board had mistreated the shareholders. The verdict was reversed by the Supreme Court of the Netherlands. In 2003, the Dutch Corporate Governance Code was released, strengthening the position of shareholders. Loudon criticised the document, arguing that the required transparency regarding management compensation led to an upward spiral in CEO salaries, and he stepped down from several boards in the years following. Loudon gave up his last position in 2008 at the Royal Concertgebouw. Following his tenure at ABN AMRO, the bank was split in 2007 and nationalised during the 2008 financial crisis. He was blamed for not doing enough to mediate conflicts within the board of directors. Loudon later said he was disappointed in the Dutch government and the bank's leadership for letting a proposed merger with ING Group fall through, as he believed it could have prevented both events.

== Personal life and death ==
He married Thalita Boon on 7 September 1962 in Wassenaar, and they had two sons, Hendrik and Hugo. Loudon lived in Velp around 1997, and he was a Reformed Christian. Loudon collected art, and he rode horses, participating in cross-country, concours hippique, and dressage competitions. He headed the organising committee of the 1994 FEI World Equestrian Games in The Hague, which had a budget of ƒ23 million and was the largest sporting event in the Netherlands since the 1928 Summer Olympics. He also enjoyed drag hunting, being chair and honorary member of the Royal Dutch Hunters' Association.

He died in The Hague, his place of residence, on 9 September 2021 at the age of 84 after a short illness. In obituaries in de Volkskrant and Het Financieele Dagblad, Loudon was referred to as a captain of industry and "amongst the most influential directors of the Dutch business community in the past decades."

== Electoral history ==
Electoral history of Aarnout Loudon
Year	Body	Party	Pos.	Votes	Result		Ref.
Year	Body	Party	Pos.	Votes	Party seats	Individual	Ref.
1995	Senate	People's Party for Freedom and Democracy	14		23 / 75	Won	

== Honours ==
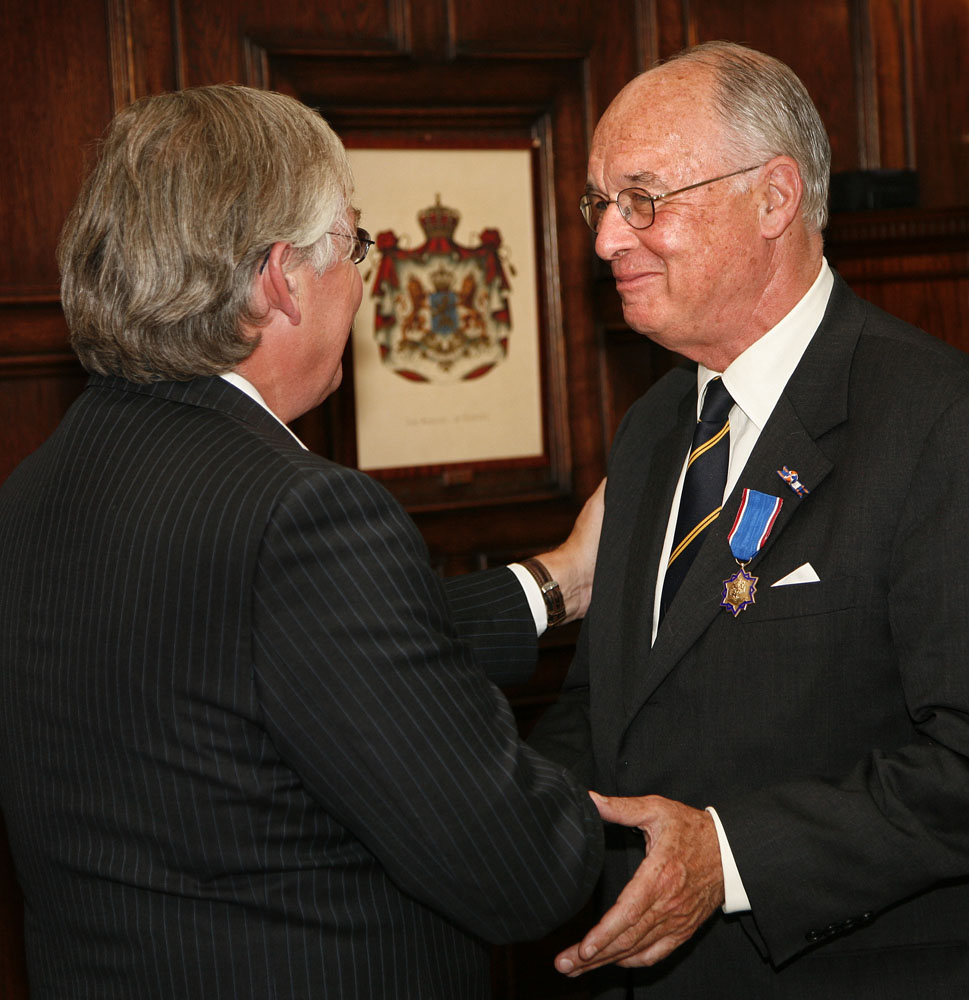
Loudon while receiving the Decoration of Merit from State Secretary Cees van der Knaap in 2007

- Brazil: Commander of the Order of the Southern Cross (1983)
- Netherlands: Knight of the Order of the Netherlands Lion (1985)
- Portugal: Grand Officer of the Order of Merit (1991)
- Netherlands: Commander of the Order of Orange-Nassau (1994)
- Netherlands: Gold Decoration of Merit (2007)
