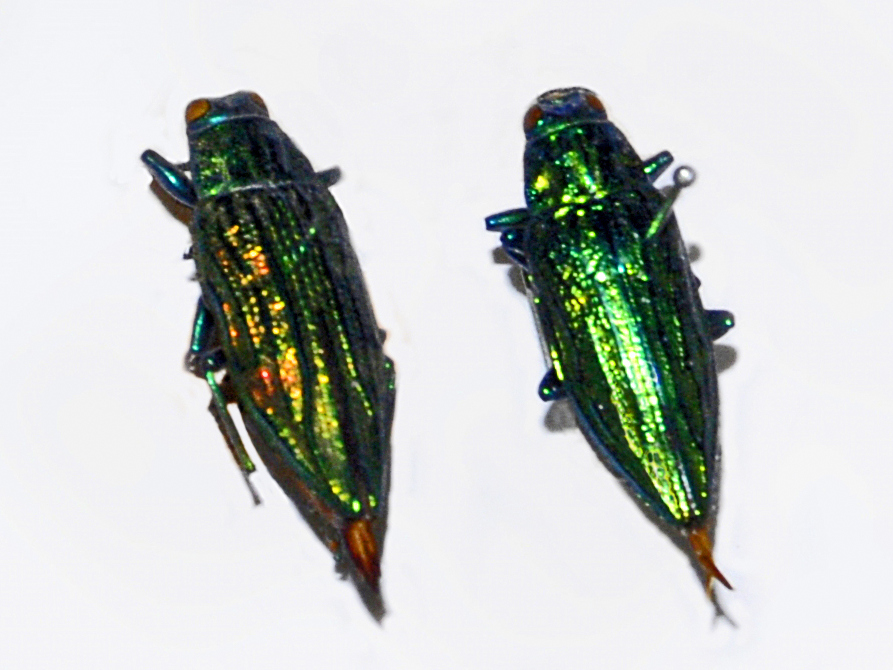
- Chrysodema radians. Mounted specimen

Scientific classification
- Kingdom: Animalia
- Phylum: Arthropoda
- Clade: Pancrustacea
- Class: Insecta
- Order: Coleoptera
- Suborder: Polyphaga
- Infraorder: Elateriformia
- Family: Buprestidae
- Genus: Chrysodema
- Species: C. radians

Binomial name
- Chrysodema radians (Guérin-Ménéville, 1830)

Synonyms
- Chrysodema aurofoveata (Guérin-Ménéville, 1830)

= Chrysodema radians =

Species of beetle

Chrysodema radians is a species of beetle of the family Buprestidae.

== Subspecies ==
- Chrysodema radians nicobarica Thomson, 1879
- Chrysodema radians radians (Guérin-Ménéville, 1830)

== Description ==
Chrysodema radians can reach a length of about 34 millimetres (1.3 in). These beetles have a glossy surface with metallic green color.

== Distribution ==
Chrysodema radians can be found in Indonesia and Northern Australia.
