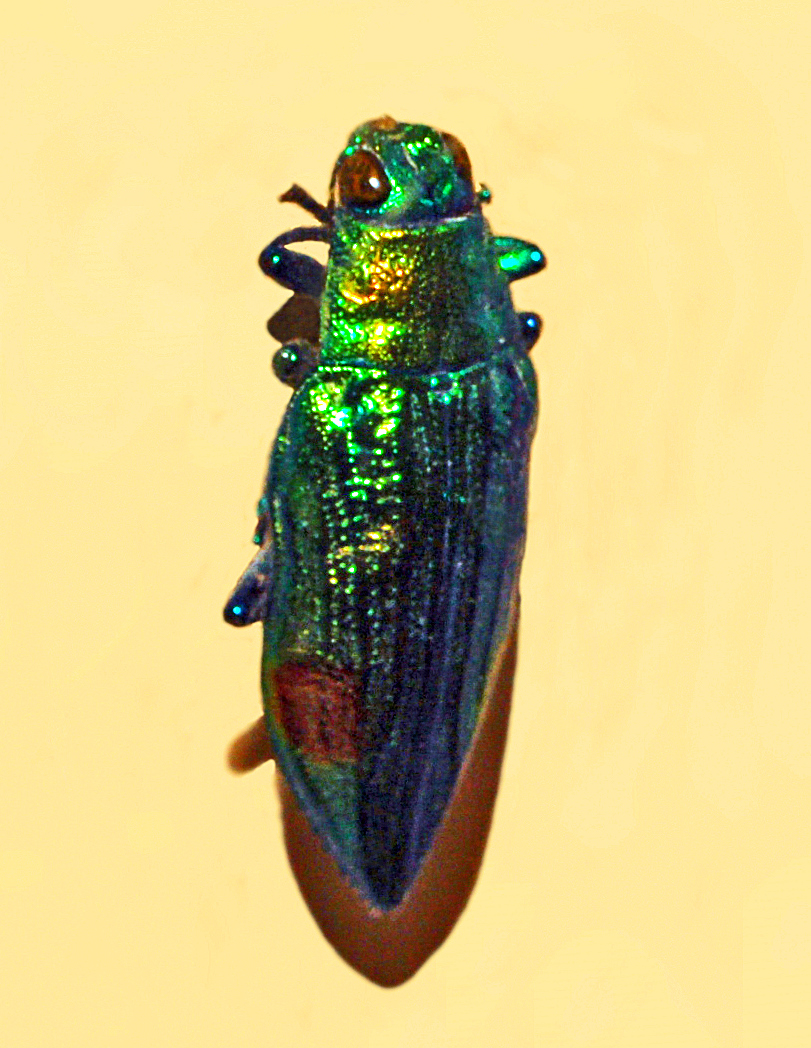
- Chrysodema swierstrae from Nias Island

Scientific classification
- Kingdom: Animalia
- Phylum: Arthropoda
- Class: Insecta
- Order: Coleoptera
- Suborder: Polyphaga
- Infraorder: Elateriformia
- Family: Buprestidae
- Genus: Chrysodema; Laporte & Gory, 1835

= Chrysodema =

Genus of beetles

Chrysodema is a genus of beetles in the family Buprestidae, containing the following species:

- Chrysodema akiyamai Holynski, 1994
- Chrysodema alberti Lander, 2000
- Chrysodema andamana Kerremans, 1895
- Chrysodema antennata Saunders, 1874
- Chrysodema apoensis (Kurosawa, 1979)
- Chrysodema auroplagiata Deyrolle, 1864
- Chrysodema aurostriata Saunders, 1866
- Chrysodema badenii (Saunders, 1874)
- Chrysodema bifoveolata Holynski, 1994
- Chrysodema borneensis Kerremans, 1909
- Chrysodema celebensis Kerremans, 1909
- Chrysodema claudinae Lander, 2000
- Chrysodema continentalis Holynski, 1994
- Chrysodema coolsi Holynski, 1994
- Chrysodema costata Thomson, 1879
- Chrysodema cyanicollis Kerremans, 1900
- Chrysodema dalmanni Eschcholtz in Mannerheim, 1837
- Chrysodema danterina Gigli, 2007
- Chrysodema deyrollei Saunders, 1874
- Chrysodema doriana (Dohrn, 1873)
- Chrysodema elongata Kerremans, 1900
- Chrysodema excellens Théry, 1923
- Chrysodema eximia Laporte & Gory, 1835
- Chrysodema flavicornis Saunders, 1874
- Chrysodema florensis Lansberge, 1880
- Chrysodema foraminifera Lansberge, 1879
- Chrysodema fucata Deyrolle, 1864
- Chrysodema furcata Kerremans, 1919
- Chrysodema impressicollis Laporte & Gory, 1835
- Chrysodema indica Kerremans, 1909
- Chrysodema iris (Kerremans, 1898)
- Chrysodema jucunda Laporte & Gory, 1835
- Chrysodema lethierryi Théry, 1923
- Chrysodema lewisii Saunders, 1873
- Chrysodema lottinii (Boisduval, 1835)
- Chrysodema malacca Deyrolle, 1864
- Chrysodema marinduquensis (Kurosawa, 1979)
- Chrysodema mniszechii Deyrolle, 1864
- Chrysodema moluensis Novak, 2010
- Chrysodema neefi Lander, 2003
- Chrysodema purpureicollis Saunders, 1874
- Chrysodema purpureoimpressa Deyrolle, 1864
- Chrysodema pyrostictica (Snellen van Vollenhoven, 1864)
- Chrysodema pyrothorax (Snellen van Vollenhoven, 1864)
- Chrysodema radians (Guérin-Ménéville, 1830)
- Chrysodema revisa (Gemminger & Harold, 1869)
- Chrysodema robusta Deyrolle, 1864
- Chrysodema rubifrons Deyrolle, 1864
- Chrysodema ruficornis Obenberger, 1928
- Chrysodema sainvali Holynski, 1994
- Chrysodema schmeltzii (Saunders, 1874)
- Chrysodema sibuyanica Fisher, 1924
- Chrysodema simplex Waterhouse, 1887
- Chrysodema smaragdula (Olivier, 1790)
- Chrysodema sonnerati Laporte & Gory, 1835
- Chrysodema subrevisa Thomson, 1879
- Chrysodema swierstrae Lansberge, 1883
- Chrysodema terabayashii Lander, 2003
- Chrysodema ulfi Lander, 2003
- Chrysodema vanderraadi Hulstaert, 1923
- Chrysodema variipennis Saunders, 1874
- Chrysodema ventralis Waterhouse, 1885
- Chrysodema walkeri (Waterhouse, 1892)
- Chrysodema wallaceae Holynski, 1994
- Chrysodema wallacei Deyrolle, 1864
- Chrysodema yasumatsui Kurosawa, 1954
