= Velp, Gelderland =

Velp
- Town
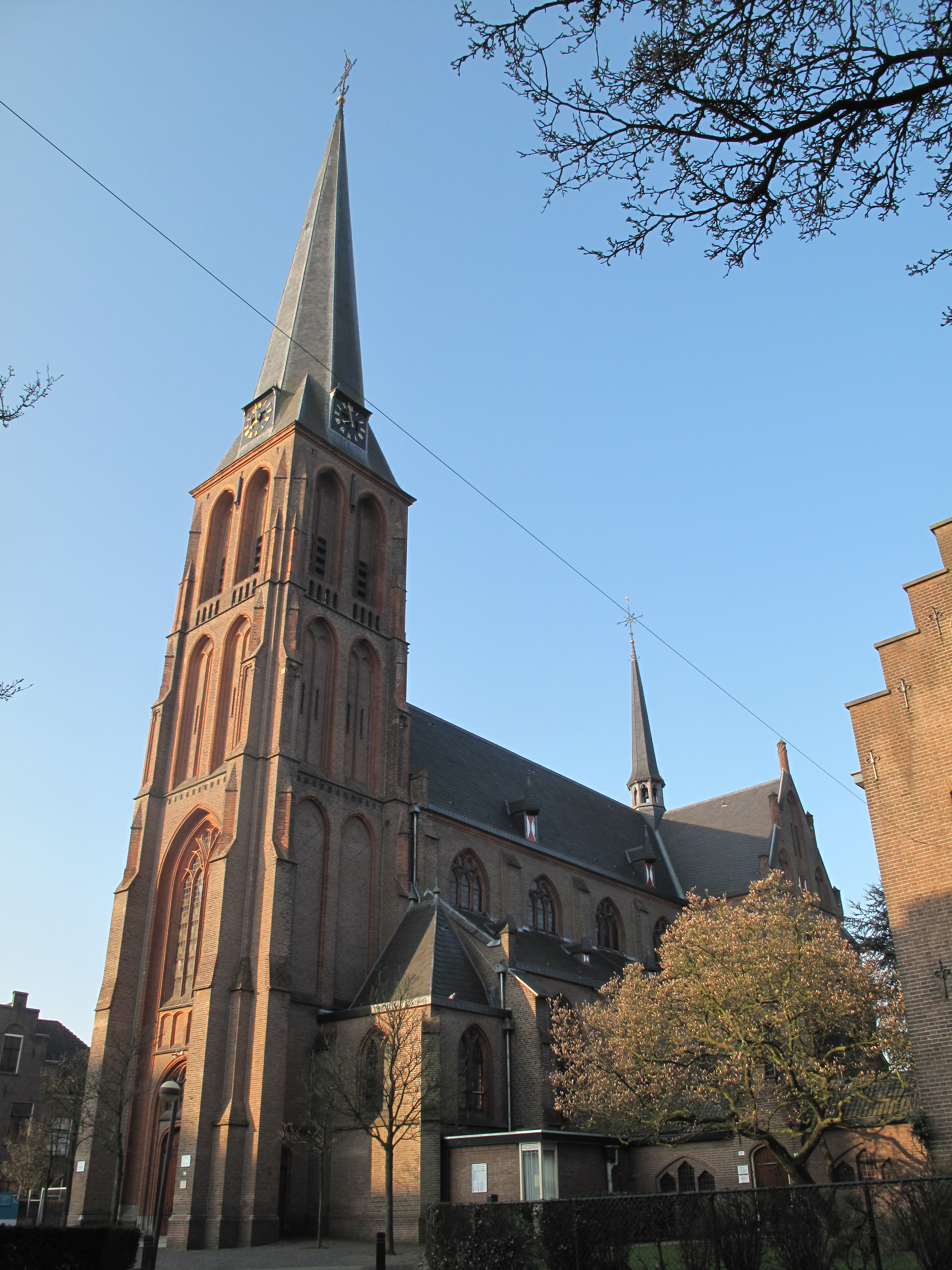
- Onze Lieve Vrouw Visitatiekerk

- Location in the province of Gelderland in the Netherlands Velp (Netherlands)
- Coordinates: 51°59′41″N 5°58′33″E
- Country: Netherlands
- Province: Gelderland
- Municipality: Rheden

Area
  - Total: 11.02 km^{2} (4.25 sq mi)
- Elevation: 18 m (59 ft)

Population (2021)
  - Total: 18,100
  - Density: 1,640/km^{2} (4,250/sq mi)
- Time zone: UTC+1 (CET)
  - Summer (DST): UTC+2 (CEST)
- Postal code: 6881-6883
- Dialing code: 026
- Major roads: A12

Velp is a Dutch village located east of Arnhem within the municipality of Rheden, between Arnhem, Rozendaal, and the town of Rheden.

Velp was a separate municipality from 1812 to 1818, when it was merged with Rheden. The municipality also included the village of Rozendaal.

== Notable residents ==
- ChevoBeatz, recording producer.
- Jan Goossens, former American indoor soccer player.
- Ho-Pin Tung, auto-racing driver
- René Klaassen, former field hockey defender
- Mina Kruseman, 19th-century feminist and author
- Ella van Heemstra, aristocrat and mother of Audrey Hepburn
- Audrey Hepburn, 20th-century actress and humanitarian
- Aarnout Loudon, corporate executive and politician
