= Mochamad Singer =

Indonesian politician

Raden Tumenggung Mochamad Singer

Regent of Sumedang
- In office 5 December 1947 – 1949
- Wali Negara: Wiranatakusumah
- Preceded by: Hasan Soeria Satjakoesoemah
- Succeeded by: Hasan Soeria Satjakoesoemah

Personal details
- Born: 21 September 1903 Cimahi, Dutch East Indies
- Died: 25 September 1998 (aged 95) Sukabumi, Indonesia
- Relations: Soeria Atmadja (uncle)
- Profession: Politician; Bureaucrat

Mochamad Singer (also spelled Moehamad Singer, Mohamad Singer, Muhammad Singer; 21 September 1903 – 25 September 1998) was an Indonesian politician and bureaucrat who served as the Regent of Sumedang (1947–1949).

== Early life and education ==
Singer was born in Cimahi on 21 September 1903. His father was R. Rangga Raksa Mihardja, and he was a nephew of Soeria Atmadja. He was educated at OSVIA. When he was an OSVIA student, he competed in a chess tournament. He graduated from OSVIA in 1923. From 1931 to 1933, he attended courses held at the Administrative School in Batavia.

== Career ==
After graduating from OSVIA, Singer worked as a native administrative official trainee (CIBA) at the Resident’s Office of the Priangan Regency. He later served as a civilian official (mantri) in Sukabumi Regency. In April 1929, the Dutch East Indies government appointed him as Assistant District Chief of Jonggol, replacing Martadiwangsa, who had gone missing in early March.

Singer was appointed as District Chief of Boven Digoel on 23 June 1938, replacing Ateng Soerapradja. In 1943, he stepped down as Wedana of Boven Digoel and moved to Australia. During his time there, he joined SIBAR (Serikat Indonesia Baroe, New Indonesia Association) and served as Director of the Administrative School (Bestuursschool) located at Camp Columbia, Brisbane, from 1944 to April 1945. In May 1945, he was appointed as Acting Assistant Resident of the Tual District. He later worked in Sulawesi and then at the Resident’s Office of East Kalimantan.

On 5 December 1947, the Recomba government appointed Singer as Regent of Sumedang and conferred upon him the title of tumenggung. During his tenure as Regent, he successfully collected and reorganized the scattered assets of Soeria Atmadja, including its inheritance and endowment (waqf) assets. After gathering these assets, he handed them over to Soeria Atmadja’s heirs on 1 December 1949. He resigned as Regent of Sumedang in 1949 and moved to the Netherlands.

Singer later returned to Indonesia in unknown year. Upon his return, he worked at the Ministry of Home Affairs in the agrarian department. In 1952, together with Abas Wilaga Somantri Padmanegara, he was appointed as a representative of the Ministry of Home Affairs to deliver an order for the dissolution of the Depok Municipality to its then president, Johannes Matijs Jonathans. The meeting resulted in an agreement.

== Death and personal life ==
Singer died on 25 September 1998 in Sukabumi and was buried at the Gunung Puyuh Cemetery in Sumedang. In February 2022, his grave was reported to be in an unmaintained condition.

Singer was married and had children. One of his children, Siti Patimah, married an agronomist, Salmon Padmanagara.

== Awards ==
- Cross of Merit - June 1943.
