= James Loudon (politician) =

Dutch East Indies statesman (1824–1900)

Jonkheer James Loudon
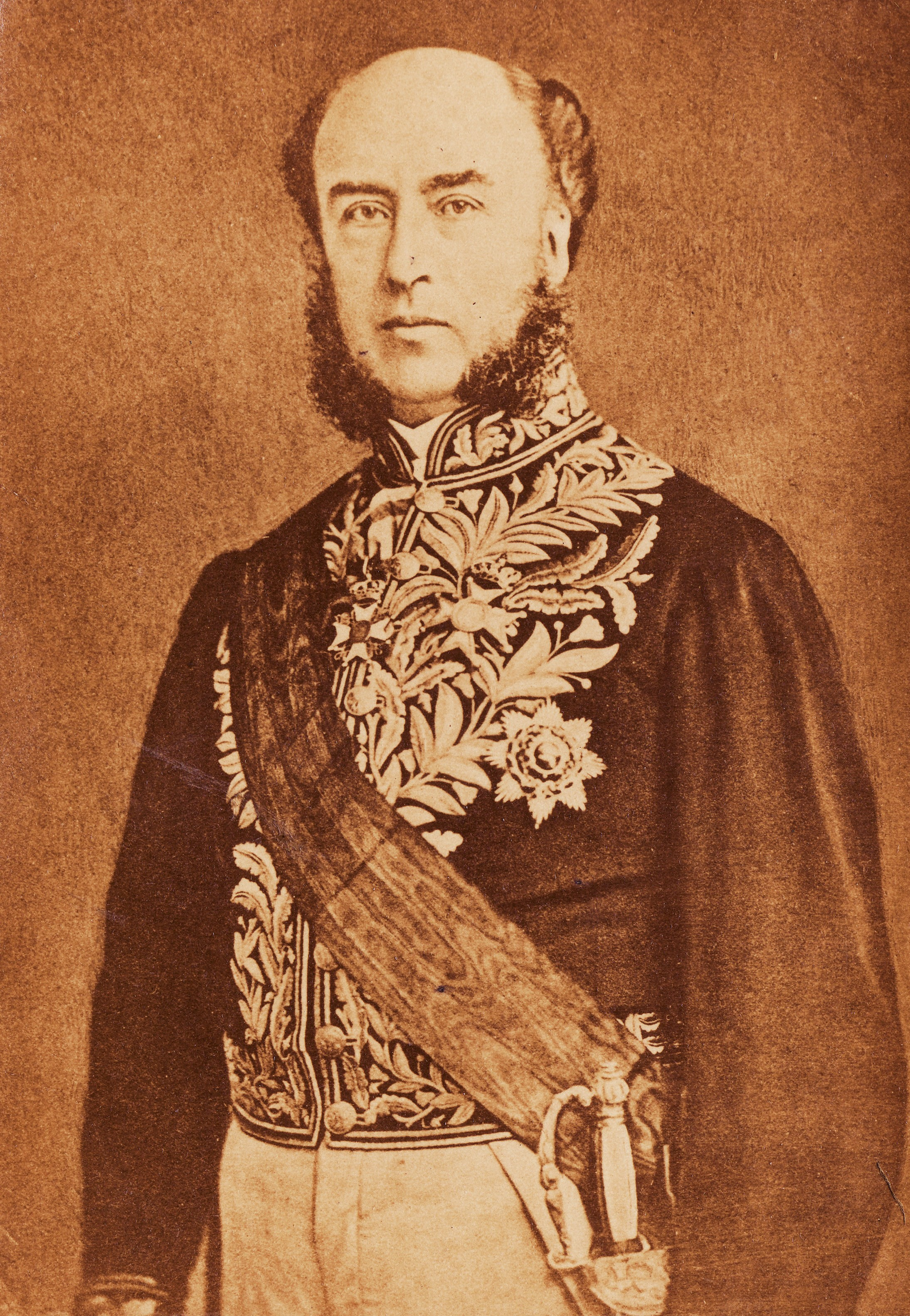
- James Loudon in 1875

Governor-General of the Dutch East Indies
- In office 1 January 1872 – 26 March 1875
- Monarch: William III
- Preceded by: Pieter Mijer
- Succeeded by: Johan Wilhelm van Lansberge

Minister of Colonial Affairs
- In office 14 March 1861 – 31 January 1862
- Prime Minister: Jacob van Zuylen van Nijevelt; Schelto van Heemstra
- Preceded by: Jean Pierre Cornets de Groot van Kraaijenburg
- Succeeded by: Gerhard Hendrik Uhlenbeck

Personal details
- Born: 8 June 1824 The Hague, United Kingdom of the Netherlands
- Died: 31 May 1900 (aged 75) The Hague, Netherlands

Jonkheer James Loudon (8 June 1824 – 31 May 1900) was a Dutch politician. He was Minister of Colonial Affairs in the Van Zuylen van Nijevelt-Van Heemstra cabinet (1861–1862), King's Commissioner in South Holland (1862–1871), and Governor-General of the Dutch East Indies (1872–1875). He was the father of politician John Loudon.

The ship Gouverneur Generaal Loudon (1875) was named after him.

He was made a Jonkheer in 1884.

== Honors ==
- Knight in the Order of the Netherlands Lion (1860)
- Commander in the Order of the Netherlands Lion (1862)
- Grand Officer in the Order of the Oak Crown (1868)
- Grand Cross in the Order of the Oak Crown (1871)
- Knight First Class in the Order of the Gold Lion of the House of Nassau (1879)

Political offices
Preceded by Pieter Mijer	Governor-General of the Dutch East Indies; 1872–1875	Succeeded by Johan Wilhelm van Lansberge
