= Frederik s'Jacob =

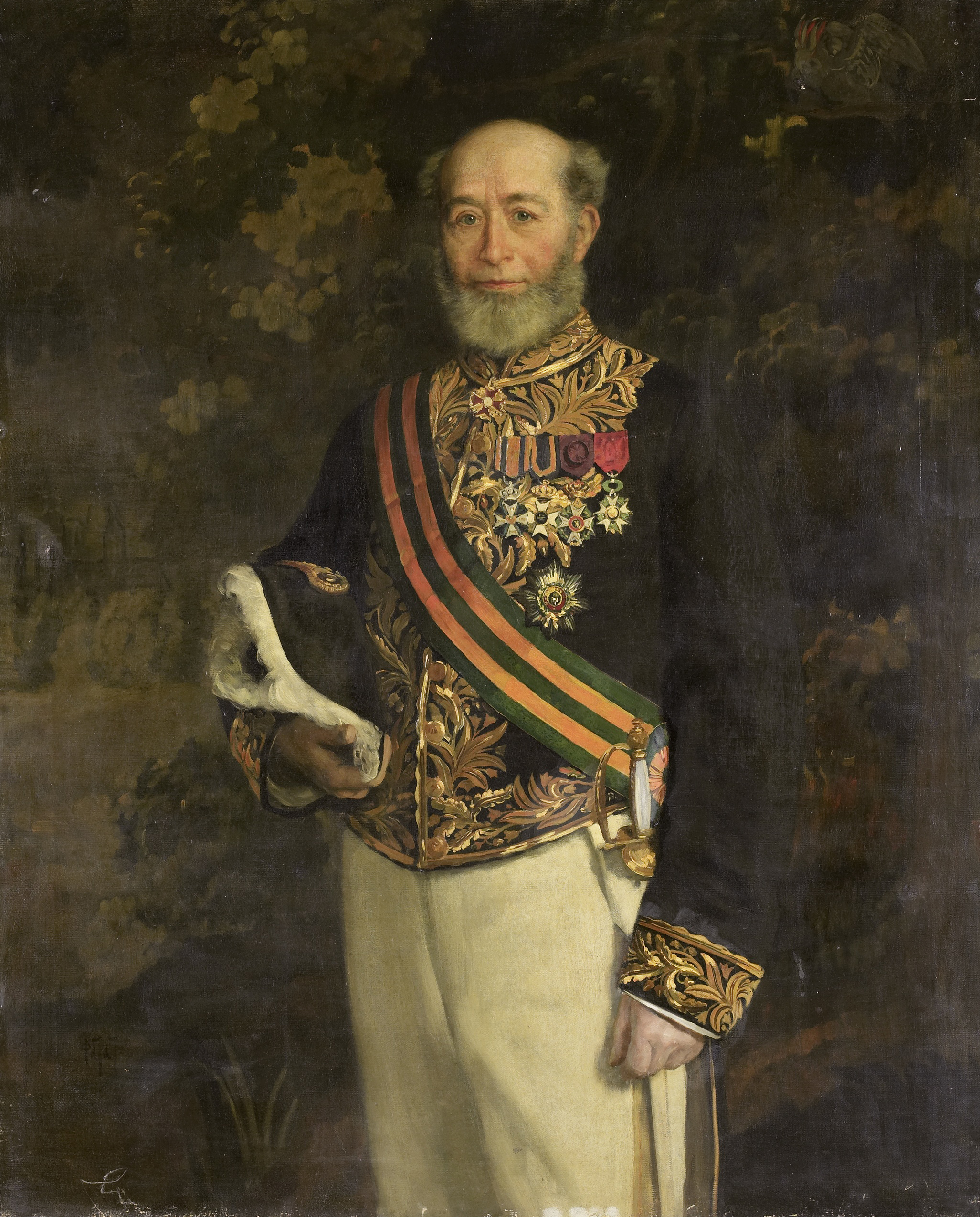

Governor-General of the Dutch East Indies
- In office 12 April 1881 – 20 January 1884
- Monarch: William III
- Preceded by: Johan Wilhelm van Lansberge
- Succeeded by: Otto van Rees

Personal details
- Born: 25 February 1822 The Hague, United Kingdom of the Netherlands
- Died: 3 April 1901 (aged 79) Utrecht, Netherlands
- Spouse: Leonie Susanne Charlotte van Hogendorp
- Children: 1

Frederik Albert s'Jacob (25 February 1822 – 3 April 1901) was the Governor-General of the Dutch East Indies from 12 April 1881 to 20 January 1884.

== Early biography and family ==
Frederik s'Jacob was born in The Hague on February 25, 1822 to Maria and Frederic Bernard. He was connected to the patrician s'Jacob family through his paternal side, and his mother was the sister of Jan Jacob Rochussen, who also served as governor-general.

s'Jacob educated at the Royal Naval Institute in Medemblik, and was later appointed as midshipman first class. He then served for various positions in the Navy, including participating to fight in the Dutch intervention in Bali, for which he was awarded the Military Order of William.

He only had one surviving son, Frederik Bernard 's Jacob, who later became mayor of Rotterdam in 1893.

== Career ==
s'Jacob started his career in the wealthy business of sugar manufacturing in the Dutch East Indies, around the same time his uncle Jan Jacob was serving his term. He became an active figure during Rochussen's tenure, guiding him on the state of the sugar refineries in the colony. However, s'Jacob was typically absent, having more interest in the Dutch aristocracy.

== Tenure ==
On November 1880, King William III made a surprise appointment; then 58-year-old former sailor, businessman, and sugar manufacturer s'Jacob was to be governor-general of the Dutch East Indies. Nevertheless, s'Jacob took his appointment with pride, being known for his lavish sailor-decorated wearing, impressing both natives and naval officers alike.

In 1883, the English steamship Nisero ran aground off the west coast of Aceh, and the crew was captured and kidnapped. Only after a failed attempt to free them by force did this succeed after difficult negotiations. An interpellation was held in the Lower House about this affair.

s'Jacob, at the recommendation of his director of finance, authorized the creation of an opium anti-smuggling task force near Rempang, completed around June 1883. This was largely influenced by "opium czar" Charles TeMechelen, who lambasted the lack of crackdown on illegal opium of black markets around the East Indies. s'Jacob allotted government funds to purchase fourteen jukungs, pay their crews, and additionally add seven police mantri to work exclusively in anti-smuggling.

=== Krakatoa eruption ===
During the summer of 1883, the volcanic island of Krakatoa began long volcanic eruptions, including one in August, which became one of the most devastating and destructive volcanic eruptions in history.

The eruption caused disarray on nearby Java, and s'Jacob responded by beginning a silent investigation for research on Krakatoa's eruption. s'Jacob appointed A.L. Schuurmann to make the journey across Krakatoa, due to the absence of inspector Rogier Verbeek. s'Jacob traveled by yacht to review special damage around the area.

=== Billiton affair ===
In 1883, s'Jacob extended the Billiton Maatschappij's (now known as BHP) concession for tin and oil mining by 75 years; the original concession was for 40 years. This decision - and the approval granted by minister De Brauw - was severely criticized in the Lower House, which led to the De Brauw's resignation. s'Jacob resigned his duties shortly thereafter. A report found further economic ties with King William III and Princess Sophie, and the Dutch government forced the former to end his shares.

Political offices
Preceded by Johan Wilhelm van Lansberge	Governor-General of the Dutch East Indies; 1881–1884	Succeeded by Otto van Rees
