= Otto van Rees =

Dutch politician

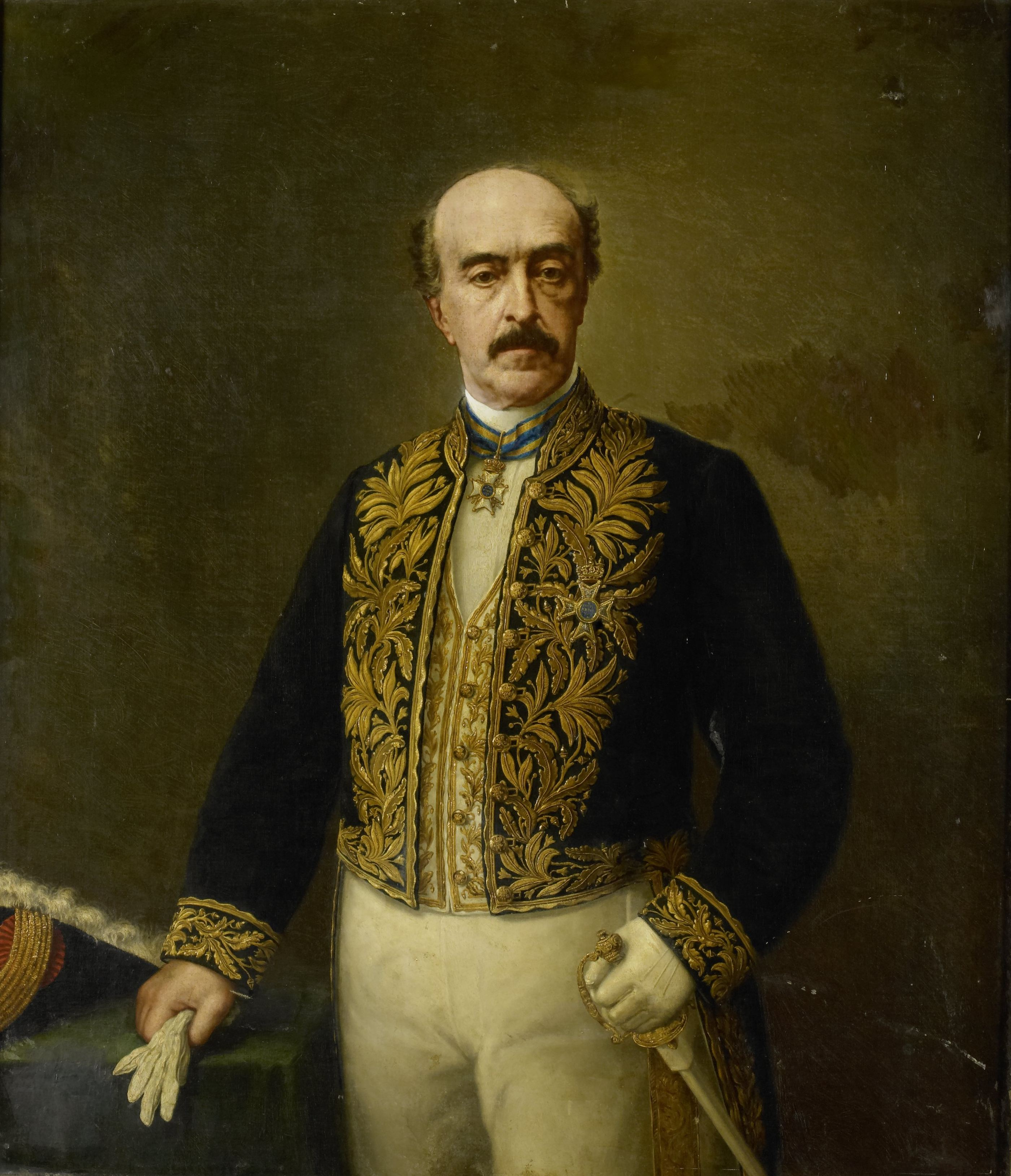

Governor-General of the Dutch East Indies
- In office 11 April 1884 – 29 September 1888
- Monarch: William III
- Preceded by: Frederik s'Jacob
- Succeeded by: Cornelis Pijnacker Hordijk

Personal details
- Born: 4 January 1823 Culemborg, United Kingdom of the Netherlands
- Died: 10 March 1892 (aged 69) Arnhem, Netherlands

Otto van Rees (4 January 1823 – 10 March 1892) was a Dutch liberal politician and the Colonial Governor of the Dutch East Indies.

Van Rees was Minister of Colonial Affairs of the Netherlands in 1879. He was president of the House of Representatives of the Netherlands from 22 September 1881 to 19 January 1884 and Governor-General of the Dutch East Indies between 1884 and 1888.

Otto van Rees had the nickname ‘King Otto’ during the time he was the Colonial Governor in the Dutch East Indies.

Political offices
Preceded by Hendrikus Octavius Wichers (interim)	Minister of Colonial Affairs; 1879	Succeeded by Willem van Goltstein van Oldenaller
Preceded by Charles Jean François Mirandolle	Speaker of the House of Representatives; 1881–1884	Succeeded by Eppo Cremers
Preceded by Frederik s'Jacob	Governor-General of the Dutch East Indies; 1884–1888	Succeeded by Cornelis Pijnacker Hordijk
