= Hype TV =

HYPE! TV
- Broadcast area: International
- Headquarters: Kingston, Jamaica

History
- Launched: 1999

Links
- Website: hypetvjam.com

Hype TV (commonly stylized as HYPE! TV) is an entertainment TV channel headquartered in Kingston, Jamaica.

The channel broadcasts performances of various upcoming and established musicians, as well as programmes about lifestyle, events, and popular culture in the Caribbean and worldwide.
