= Willem Rooseboom =

Dutch politician

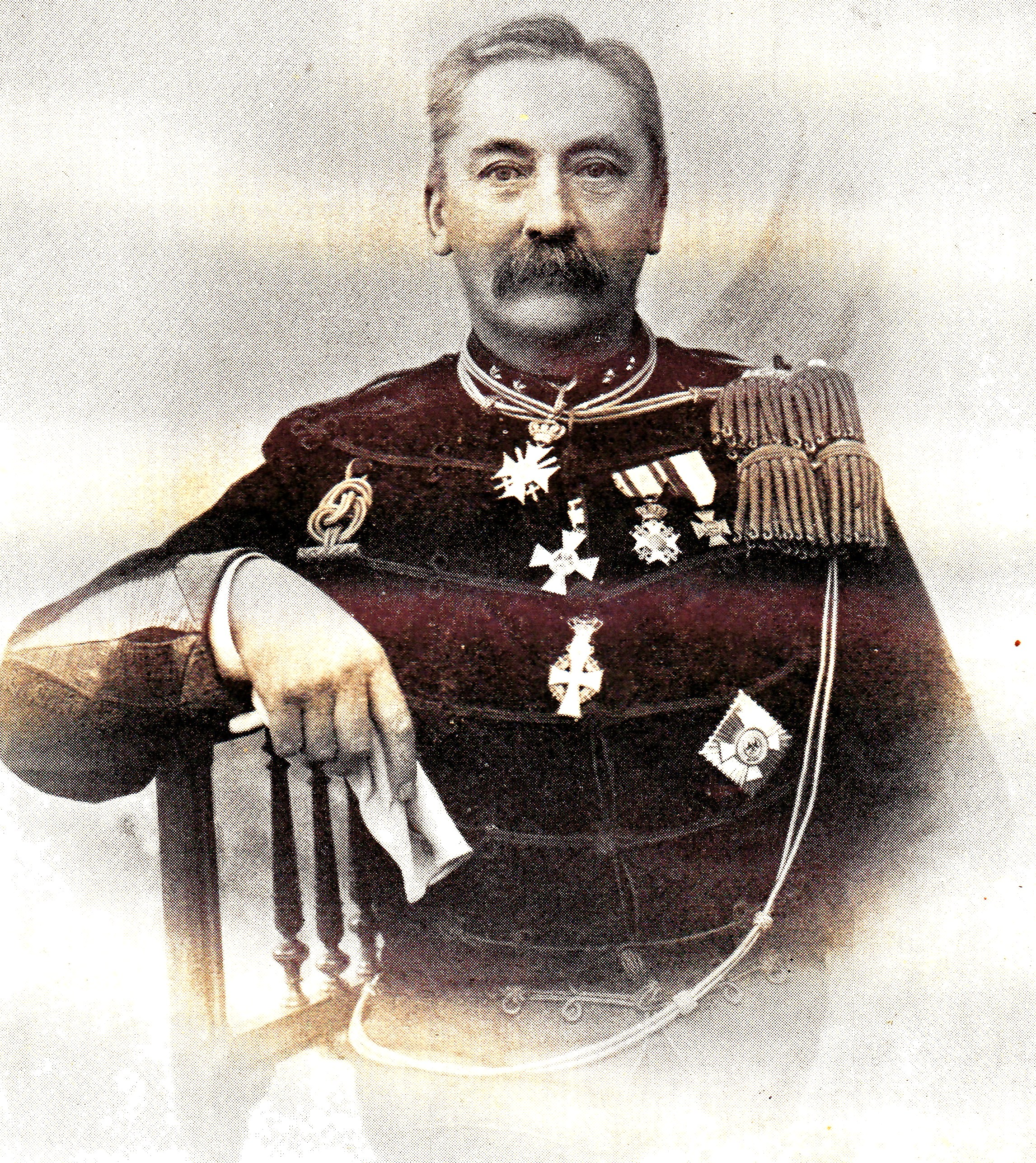
- Willem Rooseboom in 1899

Governor-General of the Dutch East Indies
- In office 1899–1904
- Monarch: Wilhelmina
- Preceded by: Carel Herman Aart van der Wijck
- Succeeded by: Joannes Benedictus van Heutsz

Personal details
- Born: 9 March 1843 Amsterdam, Netherlands
- Died: 6 March 1920 (aged 76) The Hague, Netherlands

Willem Rooseboom (9 March 1843 – 6 March 1920) was a Dutch Major General and politician. He was Governor-General of the Dutch East Indies from 1899 until 1904.

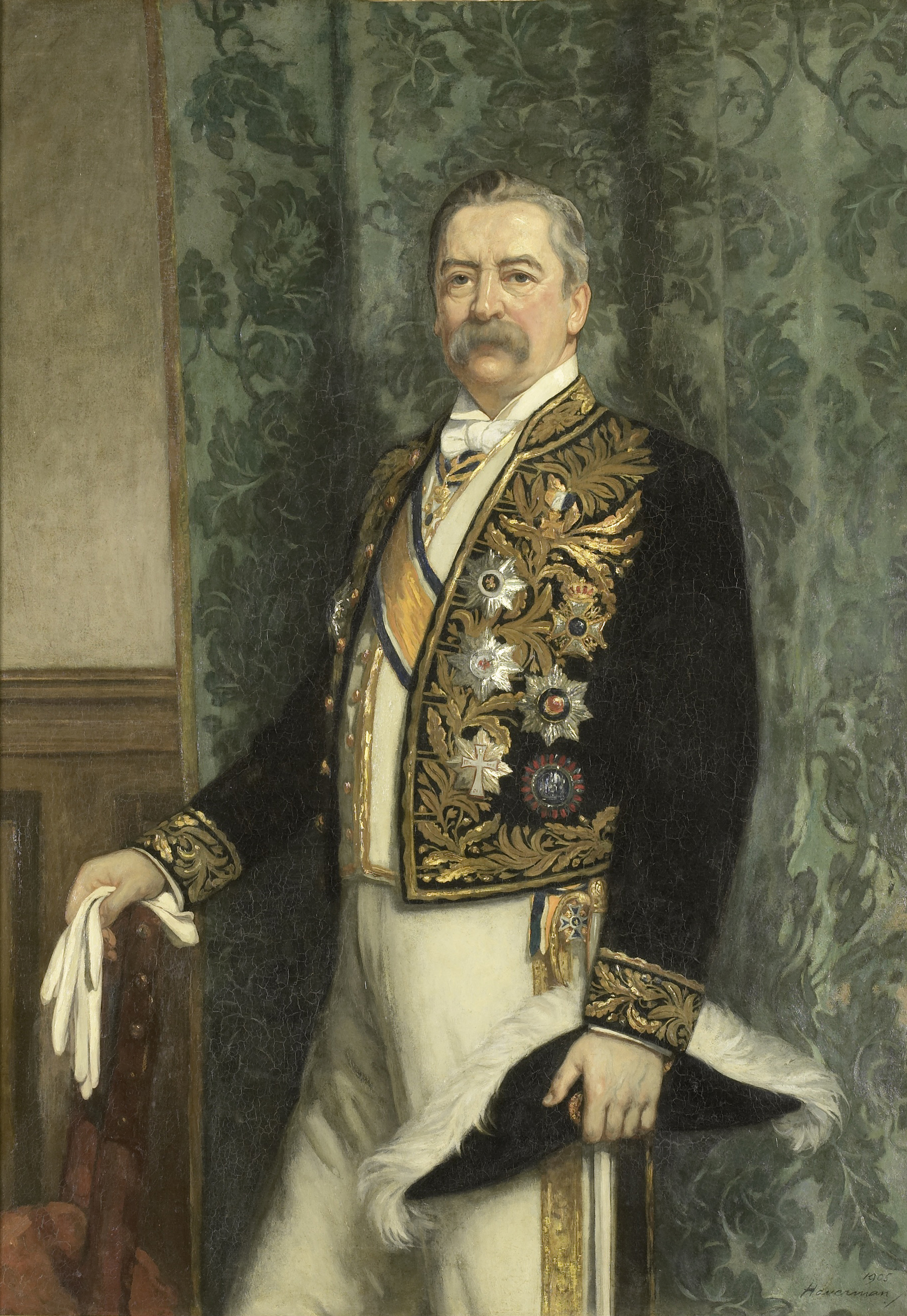
Portrait of Willem Rooseboom (1905)

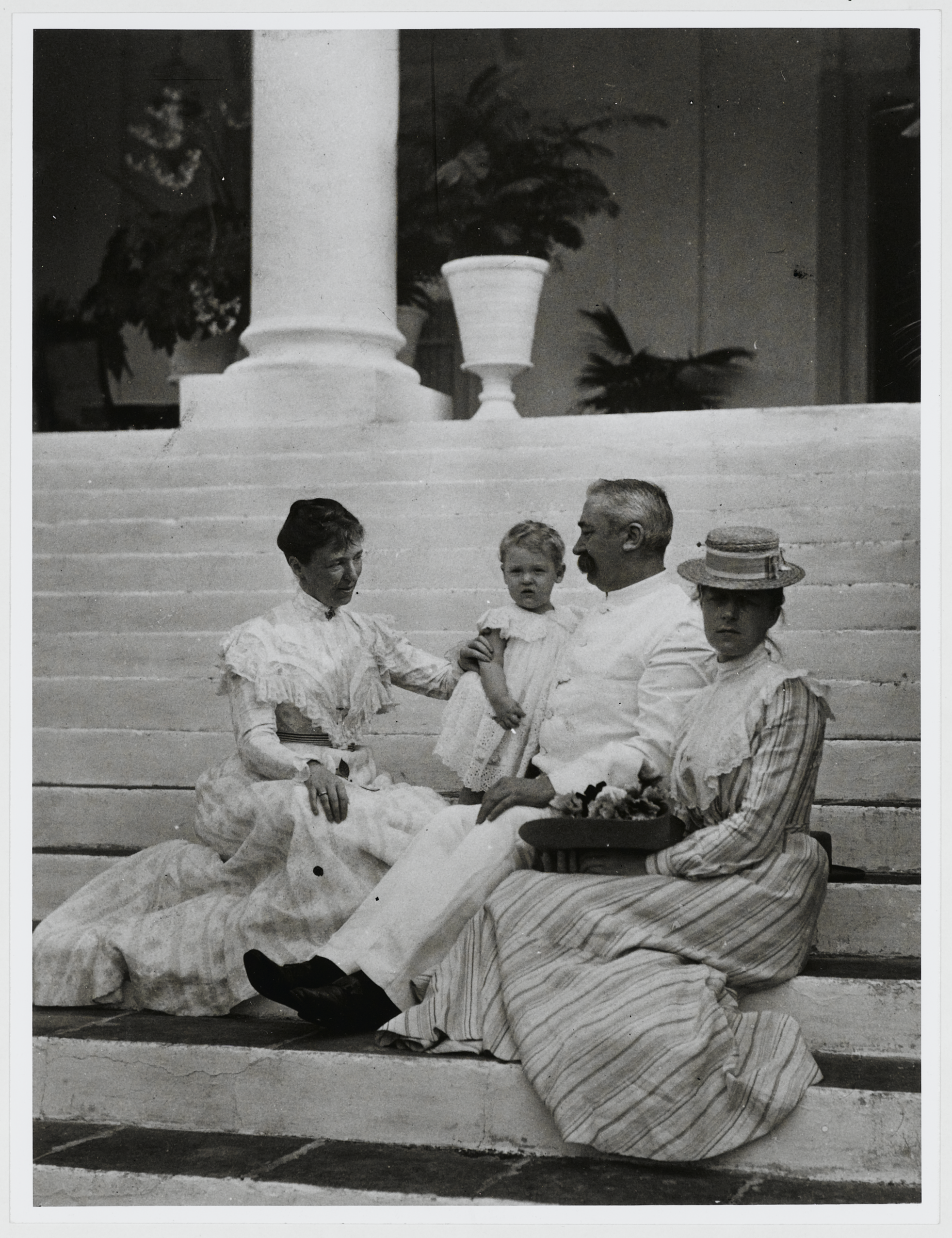
Mrs Rooseboom, H.Th. de Booij, Governor-General W. Rooseboom and Mrs. de Booij on the steps of the Governor-General's country residence in Cipanas on the road from Cianjur to Buitenzorg (Bogor)

Political offices
Preceded by Carel Herman Aart van der Wijck	Governor-General of the Dutch East Indies; 1899–1904	Succeeded by Joannes Benedictus van Heutsz
