= Cornelis Pijnacker Hordijk =

Dutch jurist and politician

His Excellency Cornelis Pijnacker Hordijk
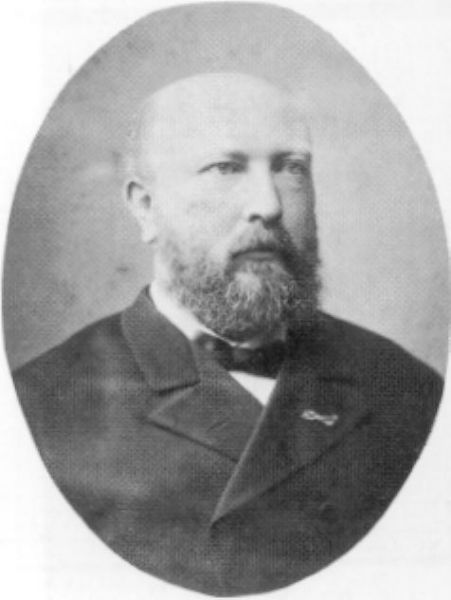

Governor-General of the Dutch East Indies
- In office 1 September 1888 – 17 October 1893
- Monarchs: William III; Wilhelmina (Emma as regent)
- Preceded by: Otto van Rees
- Succeeded by: Carel Herman Aart van der Wijck

Minister of the Interior
- In office 10 February 1882 – 22 April 1883
- Monarch: William III
- Prime Minister: Theo van Lynden van Sandenburg
- Preceded by: Willem Six
- Succeeded by: Jan Heemskerk

Personal details
- Born: 13 April 1847 Drumpt (Wadenoijen), Netherlands
- Died: 3 September 1908 (aged 61) Haarlem, Netherlands

Cornelis Pijnacker Hordijk (13 April 1847 – 3 September 1908) was a Dutch jurist and politician. He was Governor-General of the Dutch East Indies from 1888 until 1893.

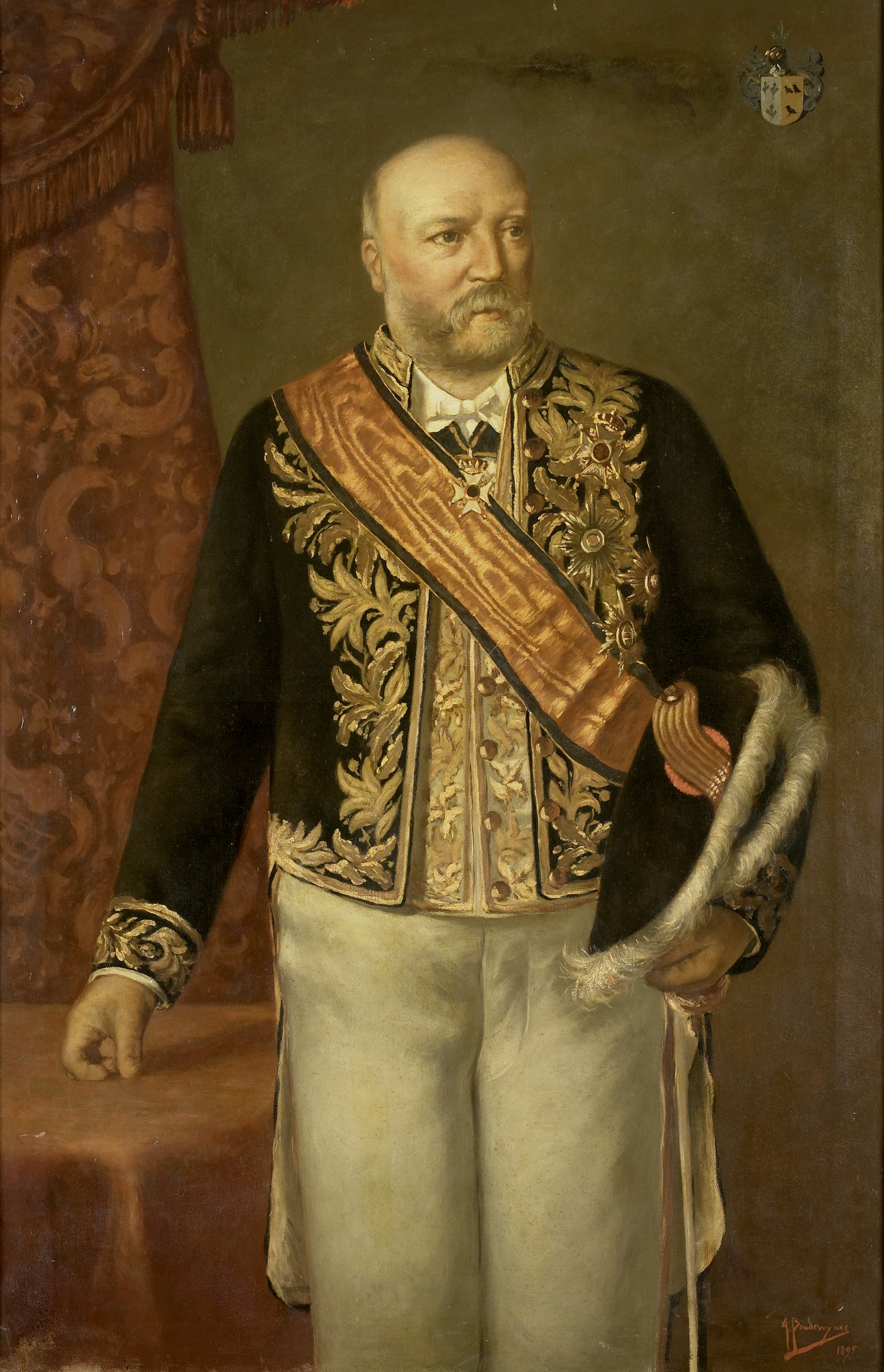
Cornelis Pijnacker Hordijk

Political offices
| Preceded by Otto van Rees | Governor-General of the Dutch East Indies; 1888–1893 | Succeeded by Carel Herman Aart van der Wijck |
