= Aart van der Wijck =

Dutch politician (1840–1914)

Jonkheer Aart van der Wijck
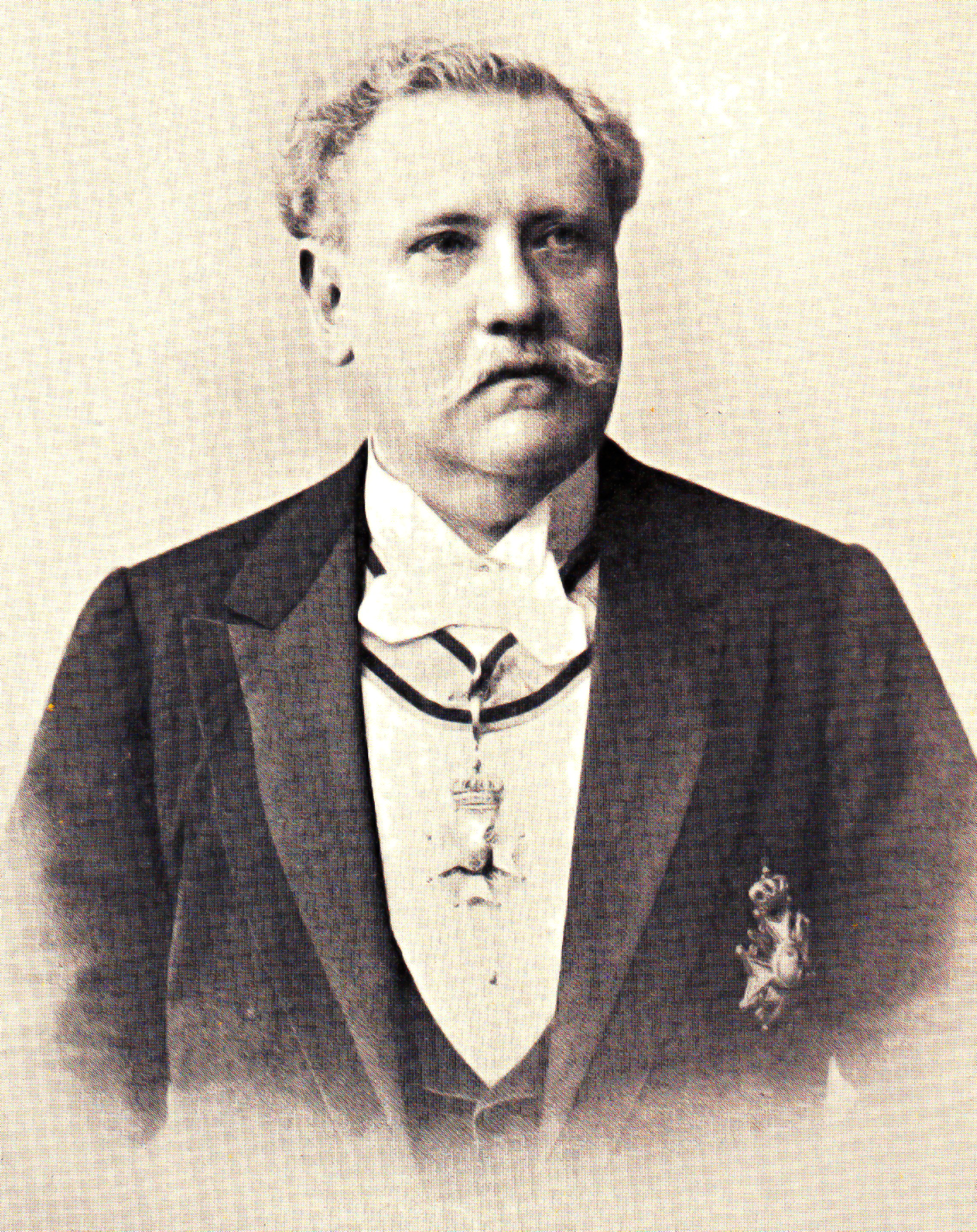

Governor-General of the Dutch East Indies
- In office 17 October 1893 – 3 October 1899
- Monarch: Wilhelmina
- Preceded by: Cornelis Pijnacker Hordijk
- Succeeded by: Willem Rooseboom

Personal details
- Born: Carel Herman Aart van der Wijck; 29 March 1840 Amboina, Dutch East Indies
- Died: 8 July 1914 (aged 74) Baarn, Netherlands

Jonkheer Carel Herman Aart van der Wijck (29 March 1840 – 8 July 1914) was Governor-General of the Dutch East Indies in 1893–1899.

== Career ==
Van der Wijck was born a descendant of the influential Van der Wijck family. He was the son of Herman Constantijn van der Wijck (1815–1889), member of the Council of the Indies, and Marianne Susanna Lucia de Kock van Leeuwen (1821–1912).

He spent the first part of his childhood in the Dutch East Indies and was sent to the Netherlands for further education, where he studied at the gymnasium in Zutphen and then the Royal Academy for the training of Indian civil servants in the Dutch East Indies. He returned to the Dutch East Indies, to Batavia, where he was appointed as second commission in 1864 to the General Secretariat and in 1865 promoted to first commission. In 1866 he was transferred in his position as main committee to the newly established Department of Internal Administration. In 1868 he entered the ranks of the actual Interior Administration by his appointment as secretary of the Batavia residence.

In 1873, he was appointed as an assistant resident in Surakarta and in 1876 he transferred in the same rank to Buitenzorg. Van der Wijck obtained a acknowledgement from the government for his decisive action to curb the disturbances in 1878 on the private country of Tjitrap (at the home of inspector Captain Von Balluseck).

He was appointed resident of Tegal in 1880; in this region, where the population was burdened by the burden of the sugar industry, with the administrative constraints attached to it until 1890, he was able to settle the conflicts about the use of irrigation water, which was indispensable for both the manufacturers (water power for the machines) and the population. In 1884 his appointment as a resident of Surabaya followed, where he was involved in, among other things, plans to improve the water management of the Solo Valley. A note from him dated 29 October 1887 on this issue was later published in the Journal of the Royal Institute of Engineers (1890–1891).

Van der Wijck was appointed as a member of the Council of India in 1888 and was appointed vice president of this council the following year. He received – at his request – an honorable discharge from Dutch East Indies service in 1891. Back in The Netherlands he became a commissioner of the Royal Paketvaart Maatschappij (KPM). On June 15, 1893, he was appointed on the recommendation of the Minister of Colonies Van Dedem to succeed Pijnacker Hordijk as Governor General of the Dutch East Indies. At his own specific request he left while still employed by the KPM for the Dutch East Indies. Upon arrival, he first appointed a new KPM agent for the Dutch East Indies, local KPM harbor masters, and implemented austerity measures at the KPM office in Batavia before being sworn in as Governor General on October 17 that year.

== Governor General of the Dutch East Indies ==
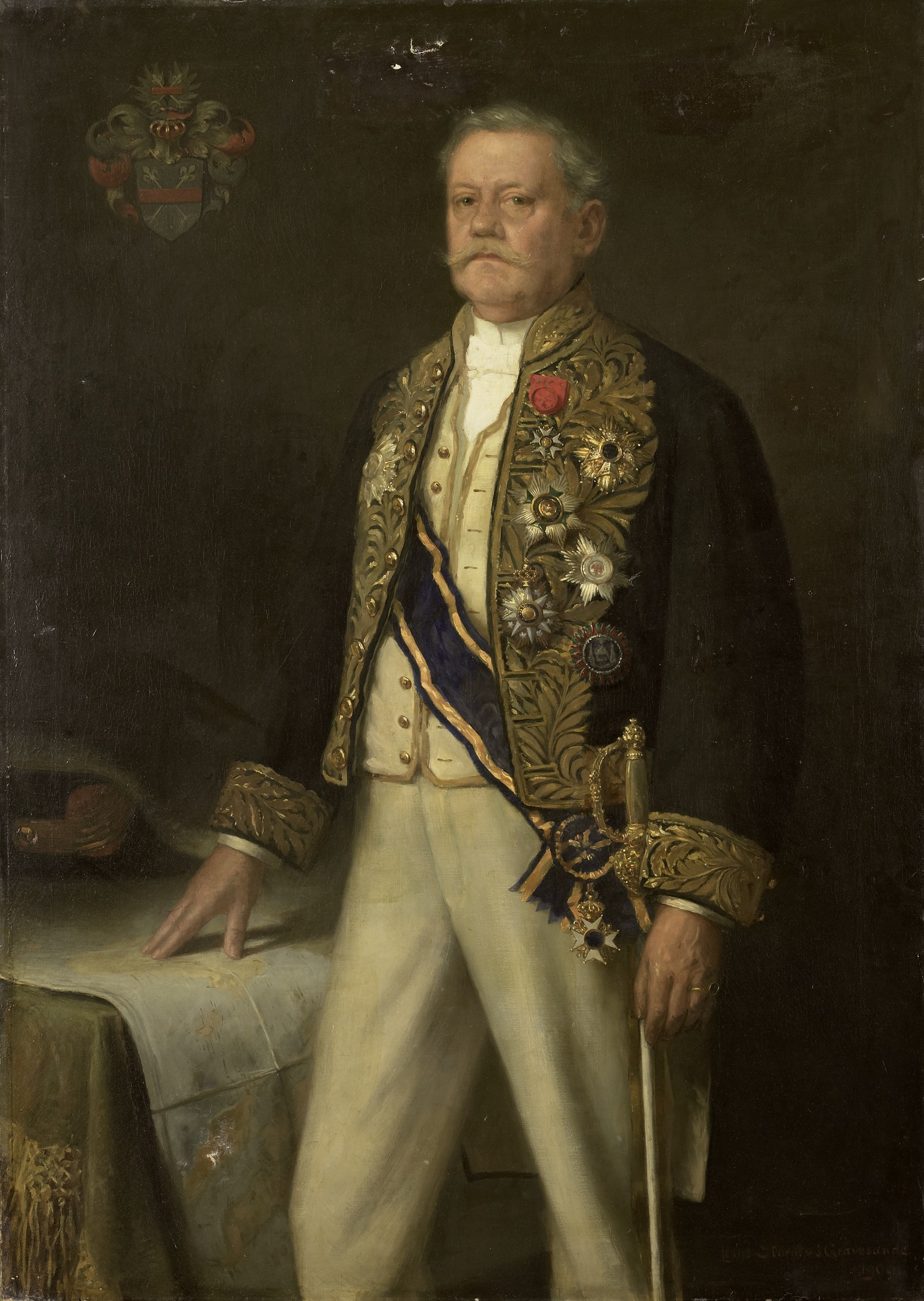
Portrait of Carel Herman Aart van der Wijck (1900)

=== Lombok ===
In 1894, at the initiative of Van der Wijck, the Dutch government intervened on Lombok, where there was a bloody battle between the Balinese rulers and the rest of the population. The expeditionary power of about 2,500 men, led by Commander-in-Chief Major Vetter, was unexpectedly taken by surprise in the evening of August 25, 1894, and had to retreat to the coast with heavy losses. About one-sixth of the expedition army was killed, wounded or imprisoned. The following morning Van der Wijck received a telegram with the messages about it, offered by the station manager on arrival at Weltevreden; in it General Vetter mentioned the Lombok debacle: the raid of the bivouacs at Tjakra Negara and Mataram, the hasty retreat to Ampenan, the killing of Major General Van Ham and of many officers and numerous soldiers, and the wounded and missing of many other soldiers.

The same morning at 10 a.m., the vice-president of the council, W.P. Groeneveld, and shortly thereafter the army commander, General Gey van Pittius, were urgently summoned to the palace and already at noon Van der Wijck presided there over an extraordinary meeting of the Council of the Indies, which was also attended by the commanders of land and naval power. At that meeting, provisional measures were adopted to supplement and reinforce the expedition and to resume operations at Lombok so that the then-lieutenant colonels De Moulin and Scheuer with others to replace or supplement them as early as the morning of 30 August could leave for the scene of the battle, soon followed by more troops and supplies.

The subsequent success of the Lombok Expedition had been of the highest importance for the maintenance of Dutch authority in the Dutch East Indies. The Netherlands certainly owed that to the army and fleet, but in the first place it was thanks to Van der Wijck, who took a decision in this matter so quickly and persevered and accepted full responsibility for it. At Van der Wijck's initiative, military reinforcements were thus sent on a large scale to Lombok; the robbery was avenged, the ruling Balinese royal family was deposed and the island placed under direct Dutch-Indian rule.

== Aceh and other Government functions ==
In Aceh, things had also gotten out of hand in Aceh; Van der Wijck intervened forcefully, dismissed responsible General Deykerhoff and sent a force to Aceh under the leadership of General Vetter, who restored order. Van der Wijck received criticism from the States General for his involvement in the lease of land by the Javanese population to the sugar manufacturers; it was believed that he took too much of the side of the manufacturers who would have turned the private sugar industry into a disguised coercive system. Van der Wijck was able to reconcile himself with the bill drafted by Minister van Dedem in 1893 for the reorganization and decentralization of the Indian administration, although he was of the opinion that it ran a little too fast on some points. He did, however, want the Indian budget to be established in India itself, as a result of which the Netherlands would hand over the budget. A further start was made under the management of Van der Wijck with the introduction of opium control, the monopolization of the production and sale of opium in the Dutch East Indies by the Dutch government.

== In The Netherlands ==
After returning to the Netherlands, Van der Wijck held a number of positions and supervisory directorships in business; the most important was that of president-commissioner of the Royal Dutch Society for the Exploitation of Petroleum Resources in the Dutch East Indies from 1903 to 1913; he was also chairman of the Mining Council established in 1902 and a member of the Senate of the States General (1904, succeeding Tak van Poortvliet). In his spare time, Van der Wijck was busy with genealogy and made the publication of the book The Münsterse Lineage of Van der Wijck (The Hague, 1911) possible. The Van der Wijck brothers were also influential statesmen: Mr. Herman Marinus van der Wijck was Minister of Marines, Mr. Herman van der Wijck was a member of the Council of State and Mr. Otto van der Wijck was vice-president of the Council of India. His son-in-law, Jhr. Mr. A.C.D. de Graeff was also governor-general of the Dutch East Indies. Van der Wijck died on July 9, 1914, in his house Thor Wieck in Baarn.

Political offices
Preceded by Cornelis Pijnacker Hordijk	Governor-General of the Dutch East Indies; 1893–1899	Succeeded by Willem Rooseboom
