= Johan Wilhelm van Lansberge =

Dutch diplomat and entomologist

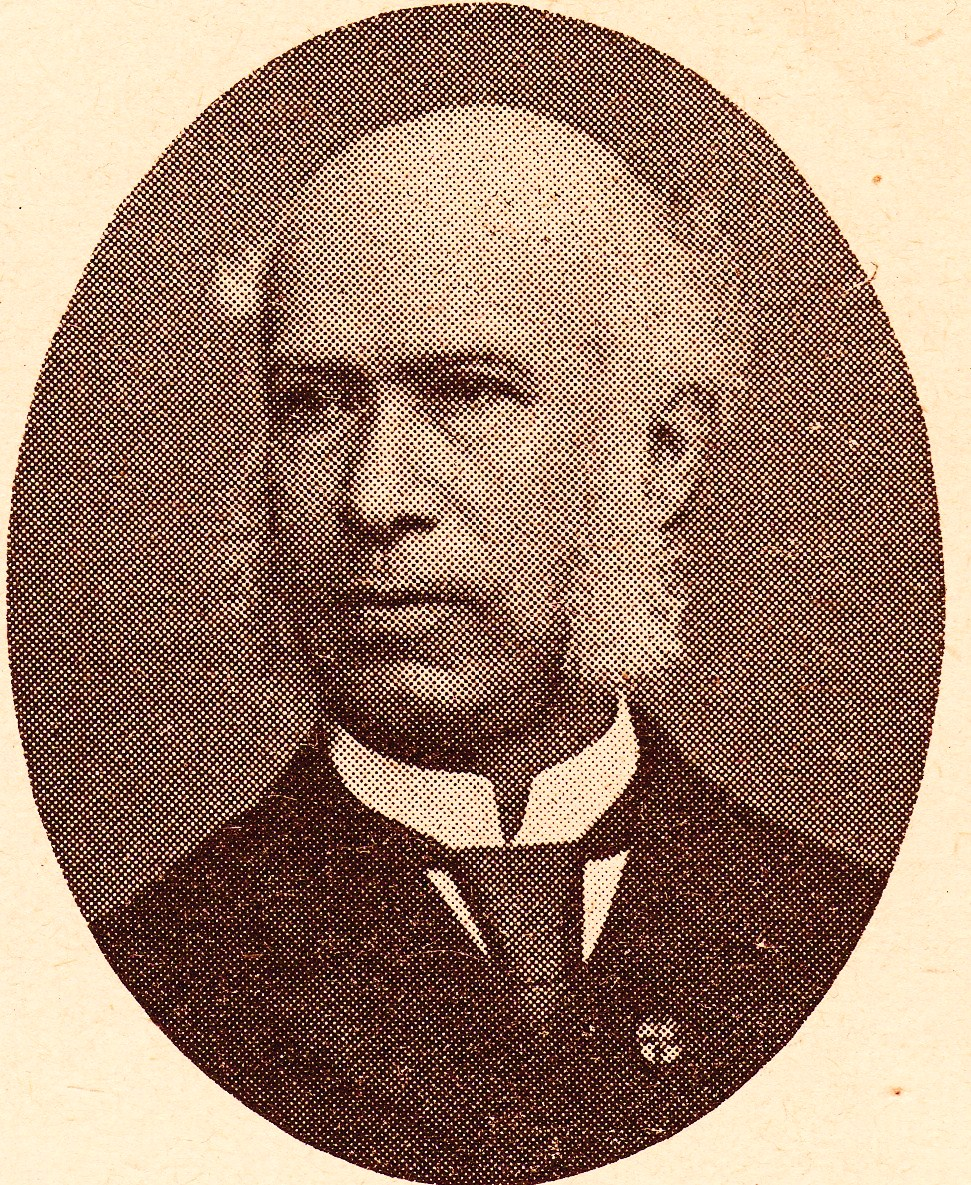

Governor-General of the Dutch East Indies
- In office 1875–1881
- Preceded by: James Loudon
- Succeeded by: Frederik s'Jacob

Personal details
- Born: 16 November 1830 Santa Fé de Bogota, Colombia
- Died: 17 December 1903 (aged 73) Menton, France

Johan Wilhelm van Lansberge (16 November 1830 – 17 December 1903) was a Dutch diplomat and entomologist.

Lansberge studied at the gymnasium in Zutphen and then, from 1848–1854, at the University of Leiden. He held various diplomatic posts in Paris, Madrid, Saint Petersburg, and Brussels.

From 1875 to 1881 he was Governor-general of the Dutch East Indies. He was the first to reside in the Palace of the Governor General building, the present Merdeka Palace of Indonesia.

Johan van Lansberge was a keen naturalist especially interested in entomology.

== Publication list (partial) ==
- 1883. Révision des Onthophagus de l’Archipel Indo-Néerlandais, avec descriptions des espèces nouvelles. Notes from the Leyden Museum. 5 (1): 41-82
- 1884. Catalogue des prionides de l’Archipel Indo-Néerlandais, avec descriptions des espèces nouvelles. Notes from the Leyden Museum. 6:135–160.
- 1886. Scarabaeides, Buprestides et Cérambycides de l'Afrique occidentale, envoyés au Musée de Leyde par MM. Veth et Van der Kellen. Notes from the Leyden Museum 8: 69–120 .
- 1886. Description d’un Cérambycide de Sumatra, appartenant à un genre nouveau de la tribu des Disténides. Notes from the Leyden Museum. 8:35–36.

Political offices
Preceded by James Loudon	Governor-General of the Dutch East Indies; 1875–1881	Succeeded by Frederik s'Jacob
