= Cort van der Linden cabinet =

Cabinet of Netherlands 1913 -1918

- Cabinet of the Netherlands

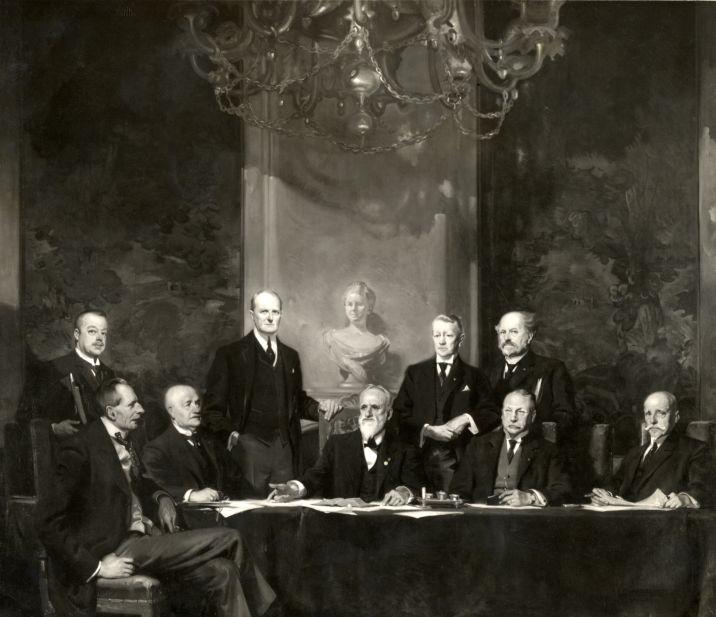
- Meeting of the Cort van der Linden cabinet
- Date formed: 29 August 1913
- Date dissolved: 9 September 1918 (Demissionary from 2 July 1918)

People and organisations
- Head of state: Queen Wilhelmina
- Head of government: Pieter Cort van der Linden
- No. of ministers: 12
- Ministers removed: 5
- Total no. of members: 10
- Member party: Independent Liberals (I) Free-thinking; Democratic League (VDB); Christian Historical Union (CHU); Liberal Union (LU); Economic League (EL) (Confidence and supply)
- Status in legislature: Centre Minority government

History
- Elections: 1913 election 1917 election
- Outgoing election: 1918 election
- Legislature terms: 1913–1917; 1917–1918
- Predecessor: T. Heemskerk cabinet
- Successor: First Ruijs de Beerenbrouck cabinet

The Cort van der Linden cabinet was the cabinet of the Netherlands from 29 August 1913 until 9 September 1918. The cabinet was formed by Independent Liberal Pieter Cort van der Linden after the election of 1913 and received confidence and supply in the House of Representatives from other Independent Liberals and several members of the Free-thinking Democratic League (VDB), Christian Historical Union (CHU) and the Liberal Union (LU) and from 15 December 1917 also the Economic League (EL). The centre cabinet was officially a minority government in the House of Representatives but was also supported by additional members of the Anti-Revolutionary Party (ARP) for a majority. It was the last cabinet with a Liberal Prime Minister until Mark Rutte became Prime Minister 92 years later on 14 October 2010.

== Cabinet members ==
Members of the Cort van der Linden cabinet
Ministers		Title/Ministry		Begin	End	Party
Pieter Cort van der Linden	Pieter Cort van der Linden	Prime Minister		29 August 1913	9 September 1918	Independent; Liberal (Classical Liberal)
Pieter Cort van der Linden	Pieter Cort van der Linden	Minister	Interior	29 August 1913	9 September 1918	Independent; Liberal (Classical Liberal)
Pieter Cort van der Linden	Pieter Cort van der Linden	Minister	Foreign Affairs	29 August 1913	27 September 1913^{[Ad interim]}	Independent; Liberal (Classical Liberal)
John Loudon	John Loudon	Minister	Foreign Affairs	27 September 1913	9 September 1918	Independent; Liberal (Classical Liberal)
Anthonij Bertling	Anthonij Bertling	Minister	Finance	29 August 1913	24 October 1914^{[Res]}	Independent; Liberal (Social Liberal)
Willem Treub	Willem Treub	Minister	Finance	24 October 1914	8 February 1916^{[Res]}	Free-thinking; Democratic League
Anton van Gijn	Anton van Gijn	Minister	Finance	8 February 1916	22 February 1917^{[Res]}	Independent; Liberal (Classical Liberal)
Willem Treub	Willem Treub	Minister	Finance	22 February 1917	9 September 1918	Independent; Liberal (Social Liberal)
Willem Treub	Willem Treub	Minister	Finance	22 February 1917	9 September 1918	Economic League
Bastiaan Ort	Bastiaan Ort	Minister	Justice	29 August 1913	9 September 1918	Independent; Liberal (Classical Liberal)
Willem Treub	Willem Treub	Minister	Agriculture, Industry and Commerce	29 August 1913	19 November 1914	Free-thinking; Democratic League
Folkert Posthuma	Folkert Posthuma	Minister	Agriculture, Industry and Commerce	19 November 1914	9 September 1918	Independent; Liberal (Conservative Liberal)
Nicolaas Bosboom	Nicolaas Bosboom	Minister	War	29 August 1913	15 May 1917^{[Res]}	Independent; Liberal (Conservative Liberal)
Jean Jacques Rambonnet	Jean Jacques Rambonnet	Minister	War	15 May 1917	15 June 1917^{[Ad interim]}	Independent; Liberal (Classical Liberal)
Bonifacius Cornelis de Jonge	Bonifacius Cornelis de Jonge	Minister	War	15 June 1917	9 September 1918	Christian Historical Union
Jean Jacques Rambonnet	Jean Jacques Rambonnet	Minister	Navy	29 August 1913	28 June 1918^{[Res]}	Independent; Liberal (Classical Liberal)
Bonifacius Cornelis de Jonge	Bonifacius Cornelis de Jonge	Minister	Navy	28 June 1918	9 September 1918^{[Ad interim]}	Christian Historical Union
Cornelis Lely	Cornelis Lely	Minister	Water Management	29 August 1913	9 September 1918	Liberal Union
Thomas Bastiaan Pleyte	Thomas Bastiaan Pleyte	Minister	Colonial Affairs	29 August 1913	8 December 1915^{[Note]}	Free-thinking; Democratic League
Jean Jacques Rambonnet	Jean Jacques Rambonnet	Minister	Colonial Affairs	8 December 1915	17 January 1916^{[Ad interim]}	Independent; Liberal (Classical Liberal)
Thomas Bastiaan Pleyte	Thomas Bastiaan Pleyte	Minister	Colonial Affairs	17 January 1916	9 September 1918	Free-thinking; Democratic League

^{Res} Resigned.
^{Ad interim} Served ad interim.
^{Note} Medical leave of absence.
