= Jean Jacques Rambonnet =

Vice Admiral Jean Jacques Rambonnet
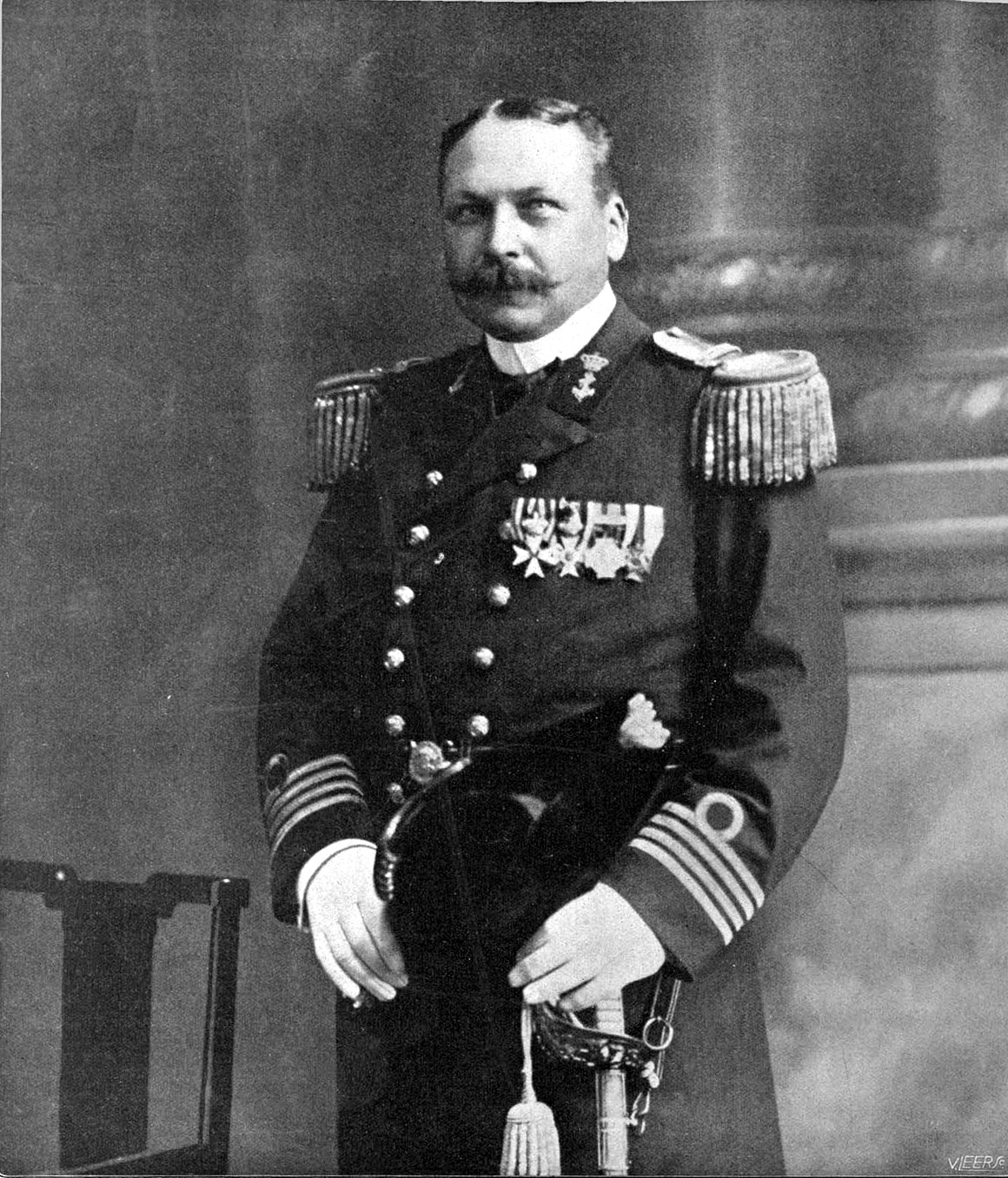
- Rambonnet as a kapitein ter zee in 1911

Minister of State
- In office 13 January 1920 – 3 August 1943
- Monarch: Queen Wilhelmina

Minister of the Navy
- In office 29 August 1913 – 28 June 1918
- Monarch: Queen Wilhelmina
- Prime Minister: Cort van der Linden
- Preceded by: Hendrikus Colijn
- Succeeded by: Bonifacius Cornelis de Jonge

Minister of the Colonies (acting)
- In office 8 December 1915 – 17 January 1916
- Monarch: Queen Wilhelmina
- Prime Minister: Cort van der Linden
- Preceded by: Thomas Bastiaan Pleyte
- Succeeded by: Thomas Bastiaan Pleyte

Minister of War (acting)
- In office 15 May 1917 – 15 June 1917
- Monarch: Queen Wilhelmina
- Prime Minister: Cort van der Linden
- Preceded by: Nicolaas Bosboom
- Succeeded by: Bonifacius Cornelis de Jonge

Personal details
- Born: 8 March 1864 Wijhe, Netherlands
- Died: 3 August 1943 (aged 79) Rotterdam, Netherlands
- Resting place: General Cemetery, The Hague, Netherlands
- Party: Independent Liberal
- Spouses: Marie Jeanne Arnoldine Antoinette Uhlenbeck (1873–1940); Anna Christina ten Bosch (1843–1921)
- Education: Royal Naval Institute, Willemsoord
- Profession: Naval officer

Military service
- Allegiance: Netherlands
- Branch/service: Royal Netherlands Navy
- Years of service: 1883–1913
- Rank: Vice admiral
- Commands: HNLMS Geep; HNLMS Koetei; HNLMS Mataram; HNLMS Evertsen
- Battles/wars: Flores Expedition 1904
- Awards: Knight 4th Class of the Military Order of William; Knight of the Order of the Netherlands Lion; Commander in the Order of Orange-Nassau, with swords; Grand Cross of the Order of the Dannebrog; Cross of Merit of the Netherlands Red Cross; Silver Wolf Award

Chief Scout of the Netherlands
- In office 1928–1937

Jean Jacques Rambonnet (8 March 1864 – 3 August 1943) was a Dutch naval officer and politician. Reaching the rank of vice admiral, he served as Minister of the Navy, Acting Minister of Colonies, and Acting Minister of War. He was also a member of the Council of State and, among other things, a knight in the Military Order of William. He also played an important role in Scouting in the Netherlands and served as the only Chief Scout of the Netherlands prior to 2021.

== Family ==
Rambonnet's great-great-great-grandfather Frédéric Louis Rambonnet (1684–1755) was a member of the Geheimrat of the King of Prussia, stadtholder of Maastricht and the County of Groedenhove, and envoy of the King of Prussia to the Bishop of Liège. His great-great-grandfather, also named Jean Jacques Rambonnet (1713–1768) and the son of Frédéric Louis Rambonnet, was a Walloon minister. Rambonnet's great-grandfather, F. L. Rambonnet (1751–1811), was a member of the legislative body for the Overijssel department.

Rambonnet's paternal grandfather, also named Jean Jacques Rambonnet (1793–1873), was a Dutch Reformed Church minister. His maternal grandfather was Jonkheer Simon Pierre François Meijer, Royal Netherlands Army officer and a knight of the Military Order of William.

Rambonnet's father, Frédéric Louis Rambonnet (1827–1900), was mayor of Wijhe. His mother was Jonkvrouw Sara Maria Cornelia Meijer (1837–1921).

Rambonnet's brother, also named Frédéric Louis Rambonnet (1867–1949), was a vice admiral, and another brother, Henri Gerard Rambonnet (1873–1961), was a major general of artillery. Rambonnet's brother-in-law Henri Marchant (1869–1956) was a minister.

Rambonnet married Marie Jeanne Arnoldine Antoinette Uhlenbeck (1873–1940), daughter of Vice Admiral Christian Elisa Uhlenbeck (1840–1897), and Anna Christina ten Bosch (1843–1921) — sister of, among others, Vice-Admiral and member of the Council of State Pieter ten Bosch (1836–1922) — with whom he had three children. One of those children was Frédéric Louis Rambonnet (1899–1945), who during World War II was active in the service of the Reichskommissariat Niederlande during the German occupation of the Netherlands as commander of the Spoorwacht and district commander of the Landwacht in Overijssel.

The Rambonnet family has been included in the Nederland's Patriciaat since 1939.

== Naval career ==
=== 1883–1903 ===
Rambonnet was educated at the Royal Naval Institute in Willemsoord in Den Helder, and in September 1883 began his Royal Netherlands Navy career as a midshipman first class with an assignment to the first-class screw steamer HNLMS Leeuwarden under the command of Captain-commandant Hendrik Dyserinck. The ship was ordered to steam to the Netherlands East Indies via the Cape of Good Hope and departed the Texel roadstead on 22 October 1883. He then was assigned to the steam frigate HNLMS Bonaire. He temporarily left active Royal Netherlands Navy service in September 1884 to await reassignment, and in November 1884 he, together with eight other midshipmen, left the Netherlands for the Netherlands East Indies on private travel, departing Amsterdam aboard the Dutch steamship Conrad and arriving at Batavia, Java, on 26 January 1885. There he resumed active naval service, assigned first to the armed paddle steamer HNLMS Gedeh and then to the ram turret ship HNLMS Koning der Nederlanden. By royal decree of 16 September 1885, he was promoted to luitenant ter zee second class, effective 16 October 1885.

In October 1886, Rambonnet was transferred to the ram turret ship HNLMS Prins Hendrik der Nederlanden. In 1887 he was reassigned first to the steam screw gunvessel HNLMS Pontianak and then to a second stint aboard Koning der Nederlanden. He later transferred to the ram monitor HNLMS Stier. On 1 July 1889 he was reassigned to the gunnery training ship HNLMS Aruba. In 1892 he was posted first to the second-class screw steamer HNLMS Sambas and then to the receiving ship HNLMS Melvill van Carnbee. He was promoted to luitenant ter zee first class and became commanding officer of the ironclad gunboat HNLMS Geep, then relinquished command of her on 16 October 1896 to begin a military hydrography assignment at The Hague.

On 1 September 1897, Rambonnet was appointed officer-instructor at the Royal Naval Institute at Willemsoord. On 11 October 1902 he departed Genoa, Italy, aboard the steamship SS Koning Willem III bound for Batavia. After his arrival in the Netherlands East Indies, he served aboard the protected cruiser HNLMS Utrecht. He transferred to the protected cruiser HNLMS Zeeland in July 1903, then became commanding officer of the gunboat HNLMS Koetei.

=== Expedition to Flores and Adonara ===
Rambonnet was the commanding officer of the flotilla vessel HNLMS Mataram in 1904 when a Dutch punitive expedition to Flores took place. The protected cruiser HNLMS Gelderland and Mataram received orders to steam to the south coast of Flores. Mataram left first, bound for Laboean Hadji on the east coast of Lombok to show the flag and make a show of force, and she briefly sent a 30-man landing detachment ashore. Subsequently, Rambonnet placed himself and his ship under the orders of the commander of Gelderland, Kapitein ter zee Jonkheer J. F. Coertzen de Kock, and the two ships steamed together to Ende on the south coast of Flores to restore order there in consultation with the resident of Timor and dependencies.

At Ende, Mataram's landing detachment went ashore, as did a 120-man landing detachment from Gelderland, with both detachments under Rambonnet's overall command. As the expedition marched toward Adonara, it came under heavy fire, including dozens of shots from lelas. The ships also came under fire, and aboard them one sailor was killed and three others wounded. With 10 men needed to cover and transport casualties, only 15 men remained available for combat, but they stormed the upper kampong and forced the enemy to flee. Rambonnet was appointed Knight in the Military William Order by Royal Decree No. 13 of 17 March 1905 for his performance at Flores and Adonara. He lectured on the expedition and about the burning of kampongs at Flores by the native troops at a meeting of the members of the Naval Association on 8 November 1906, and his lecture later was incorporated into the Association's records.

=== 1905–1913 ===
On 17 June 1905, Rambonnet returned to the Netherlands aboard Utrecht. He was temporarily inactivated there on 24 October 1905 while awaiting his next assignment. He returned to active duty in 1906 when he was seconded to the Department of the Navy in the Netherlands East Indies. He departed the Netherlands as a passenger aboard the steamship Koning Willem III and took up his new duties in the Netherlands East Indies on 16 July 1906, working in the Second Department (the materiel department). He became the chief of the department in October 1906, and by royal decree was promoted to Kapitein-luitenant ter zee on 16 November 1906.

In July 1910, Rambonnet returned to the Netherlands via private travel, and was inactivated there pending a new assignment. In August 1910 he was promoted to Officer in the Order of Orange-Nassau. Returning to active duty, he took command of the coastal defense ship HNLMS Evertsen in 1911. Under his command, Evertsen departed Nieuwediep on 17 July 1911 for a training cruise in the North Sea. She arrived in Aberdeen, Scotland, on 29 July 1911. During another cruise, Evertsen called at Bergen, Norway, on 3 June 1912 and reached Ulvik, Norway, on 30 June 1912 before returning to Nieuwediep.

Meanwhile, a debate had begun over the construction of Dutch capital ships. The Minister of the Navy, Vice Admiral Jan Wentholt, favored a design called Pantsership 1912 (English: Armored Ship 1912), a 7,600-ton vessel built to a predreadnought battleship design with a maximum speed of 16 knots (30 km/h; 18 mph) and armed with four 280-millimetre (11 in) guns in two twin turrets, ten 105-millimetre (4.1 in) guns in single turrets, and three 53-centimetre (20.9 in) torpedo tubes. After a review of the design which found it to be too poorly armed and armored, Wentholt agreed to modify it by increasing its displacement to around 8,600 tons, mounting 120-millimetre (4.7 in) guns behind thicker armor, and adding a fourth torpedo tube, but the modified design still was criticized as too weak, and the proposed ships' increased size meant that they would be too large to build in Dutch shipyards. At the general meeting of the Marine Association on 29 February 1912, Rambonnet — who led a group of naval officers who vigorously opposed the Pantsership 1912 design and advocated the construction of dreadnought battleships of similar design to the Spanish Navy′s Espana-class battleships, 15,700-ton ships which mounted eight 305-millimetre (12 in) guns and could make 22 knots (41 km/h; 25 mph) — gave a lecture entitled "A Core of Heavy Ships for Our Naval Forces," in which he questioned the minimum requirements for capital ships for the Royal Netherlands Navy and wondered whether Dutch ships met those requirements. The issue became a matter of national debate, and repeated rejections of his Pantsership 1912 proposal finally led Wenholt to leave office in May 1912. Minister of War Hendrikus Colijn, who became acting Minister of the Navy upon Wentholt's departure, was a proponent of expansion of the Royal Netherlands Navy, and in June 1912 he established a State Committee of naval experts charged with studying various issues concerning Dutch naval policy, especially the defense of the Netherlands East Indies against Japan. He appointed Rambonnet to the committee, which by July 1912 reached the conclusion — based on erroneous reporting that Japan soon would have a fleet of nine dreadnought battleships and battlecruisers — that the Netherlands needed a fleet of nine dreadnought battleships for the defense of the Netherlands East Indies, the vessels to displace 27,000 tons, mount eight 345-millimetre (13.6 in) guns, and have a maximum speed of 27 knots (50 km/h; 31 mph).

In 1912 and 1913 Rambonnet made several cruises in command of Evertsen. He relinquished command of her on 29 August 1913. He subsequently received a promotion to kapitein ter zee.

== Political career ==
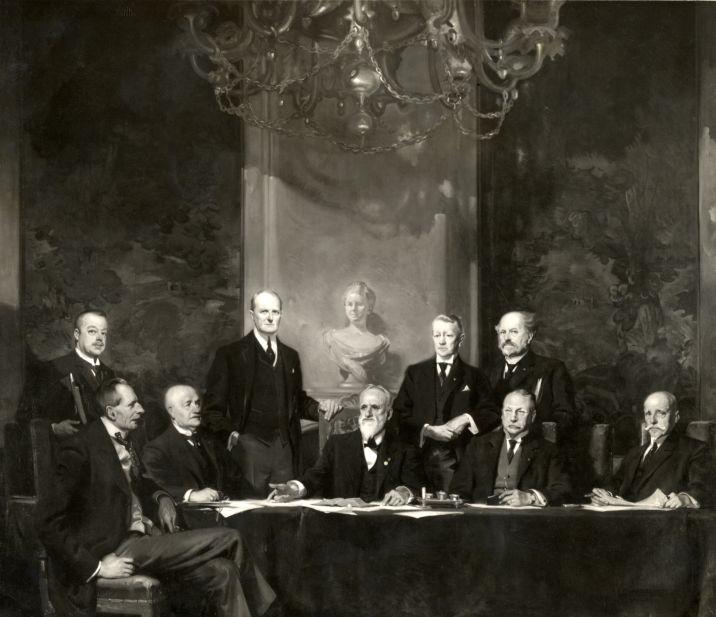
The Cort van der Linden cabinet. Rambonnet is seated second from right.

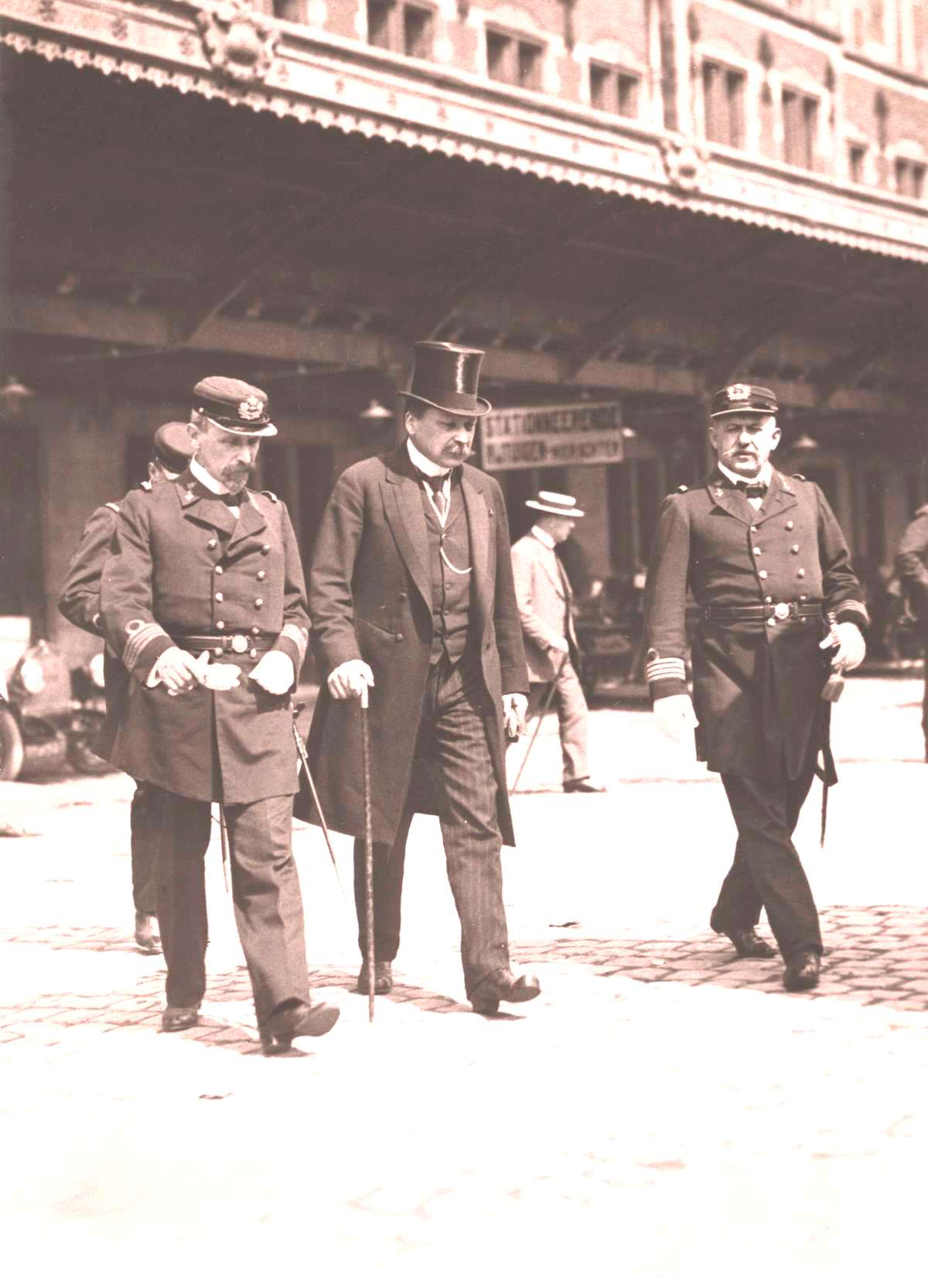
Rambonnet (center) at Amsterdam Centraal station in Amsterdam in 1914.

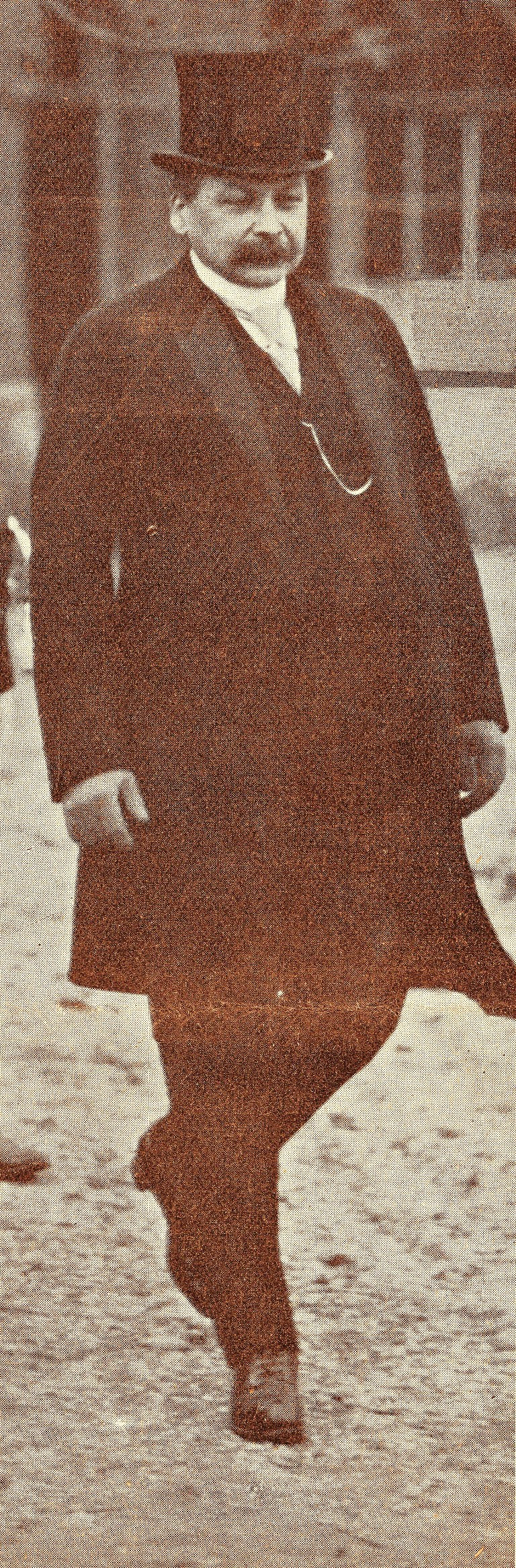
Rambonnet in 1920.

Rambonnet was appointed Minister of the Navy on 29 August 1913, succeeding Colijn. As the minister of the navy in the cabinet of the Independent Liberal Prime Minister Pieter Cort van der Linden, Rambonnet visited the Rijkswerf and the institutions belonging to the management of Amsterdam in November 1913. A steam launch brought him to the dockyard, where its director and commander, Vice Admiral G. F. Tydeman, received him.

Concerned by the potential threat the Imperial Japanese Navy posed to Dutch interests in East Asia, Rambonnet advocated that the Royal Netherlands Navy adopt a version of the "risk theory" developed by Admiral Alfred von Tirpitz for the Imperial German Navy. Rambonnet's version called for the maintenance of a Dutch fleet in the Netherlands East Indies large enough that it would outnumber the Japanese fleet when operating with the forces of a friendly power — which the Dutch hoped would be the United Kingdom or the United States — and be sufficient to deter or block any Japanese invasion. Accordingly, he reconvened the State Committee on 13 November 1913 to begin planning the design and construction of a fleet adequate for a "risk theory"-based defense of the Netherlands East Indies. At its initial meeting, the committee proposed 22,000-ton ships armed with eight 343-millimetre (13.5 in) guns, During Rambonnet's first several months in office, the committee further modified the requirement, by March 1914 settling on 25,000-ton ships armed with 350-millimetre (13.8 in) guns. The committee submitted the requirements to 11 shipyards for design proposals, received seven responses, and made its final choice from among three of them. By July 1914, Rambonnet's ministry had developed a construction plan in which the Netherlands would build five 24,605-ton superdreadnoughts, five 4,000-ton cruisers, and seven submarines. The Netherlands lacked domestic shipyards capable of building warships larger than cruisers, so Rambonnet's plan called for construction of the superdreadnoughts in foreign yards.

By the summer of 1914, Rambonnet believed he had enough political support for the construction plan to be approved in the 1914 Fleet Law, and he prepared to bring it before the House of Representatives, hoping to begin construction of the first of the new battleships in December 1914. Before the House could vote on the plan, however, World War I broke out in late July 1914, and the belligerent powers on whom the Netherlands had to rely for the construction of superdreadnoughts became fully occupied with their own wartime naval construction needs.

Although Dutch shipyards could not build superdreadnoughts, they could construct cruisers, so Rambonnet continued to advocate cruiser construction after the outbreak of the war. Uninterested in following the German doctrine of using cruisers for commerce raiding, he nonetheless was impressed with the capability of Imperial German Navy cruisers to operate independently in remote areas in the early months of the war, outgunning weaker opponents and outrunning stronger ones. With the Netherlands unable to acquire superdreadnoughts until sometime after the war ended, Rambonnet proposed an innovative naval operating concept for the Far East: Rather than using Dutch cruisers to lure an enemy battlefleet into combat with a larger friendly battlefleet on favorable terms, he proposed using cruisers to lure enemy forces into an ambush by Dutch submarines. With this idea, he was able to unite his fellow advocates of "risk theory" and the acquisition of superdreadnoughts with Dutch naval thinkers who preferred that the Royal Netherlands Navy instead pursue a Jeune École strategy with less emphasis on capital ships. He also was able to take advantage of a favorable overall Dutch political disposition toward naval expansion to secure the approval of further naval construction despite the Dutch inability to acquire superdreadnoughts, and his proposal to focus on cruiser and submarine construction until circumstances allowed the acquisition of superdreadnoughts met with widespread approval.

Rambonnet wanted to depart from the standard Dutch practice of building cruisers to match contemporary foreign cruisers and instead acquire new cruisers which exceeded the capabilities of foreign ones. He chose the Japanese Chikuma-class protected cruisers as the standard that the new Dutch cruisers had to surpass. The result was the Java-class light cruisers. For submarines, he supported a plan for the construction of small submarines for operations in Dutch waters and of larger ones for service in the Netherlands East Indies. He secured funding for six coastal submarines — three each of the O 9 and O 12 classes — and 12 larger patrol submarines of the K II, K III, K V, K VIII, and K XI classes.

When the Royal Netherlands Navy budget was discussed in the Dutch Senate in February 1915, Deputy Jan Dirk Baron van Wassenaer van Rosande questioned whether the appointment of flag officers could be carried out in accordance with established rules. Rambonnet responded by calling mistrust in the integrity of the naval authorities unjustified and defending the navy against, among other things, the claims of retired Vice Admiral Frederik Jan Stokhuyzen about the way in which Vice Admiral Gustaaf Paul van Hecking Colenbrander had been treated.

While serving as Minister of the Navy, Rambonnet took on additional duties as acting Minister of the Colonies from 8 December 1915 to 17 January 1916 — between the departure of Thomas Bastiaan Pleyte from the ministry and his return to it — and as acting Minister of War from 15 May to 15 June 1917 as the temporary successor to Minister of War Major General Nicolaas Bosboom until Bonifacius Cornelis de Jonge took up duties as minister of war. As Minister of the Navy during World War I, in which the Netherlands was neutral, he had to deal with attacks on Dutch ships and demands from belligerents with regard to shipping traffic. Minister of Foreign Affairs Dr. Jonkheer John Loudon allowed a British search of a Dutch merchant convoy bound for the Netherlands East Indies, prompting a conflict between Rambonnet — who considered this to be contrary to international law regarding neutral countries — and his colleagues over the extent to which the Netherlands should comply with such demands. The dispute led Rambonnet to resign on 26 June 1918. Queen Wilhelmina emphatically demonstrated her support for him by appointing him as chamberlain in extraordinary service two days after his resignation. He had meanwhile been promoted to rear admiral.

Rambonnet received a lifetime appointment as a member of the Council of State on 13 January 1920 (replacing Vice Admiral Pieter ten Bosch, who had resigned his position) and was sworn in as a Minister of State during the same meeting as another new member, Jan A. Loff.

== Scouting ==
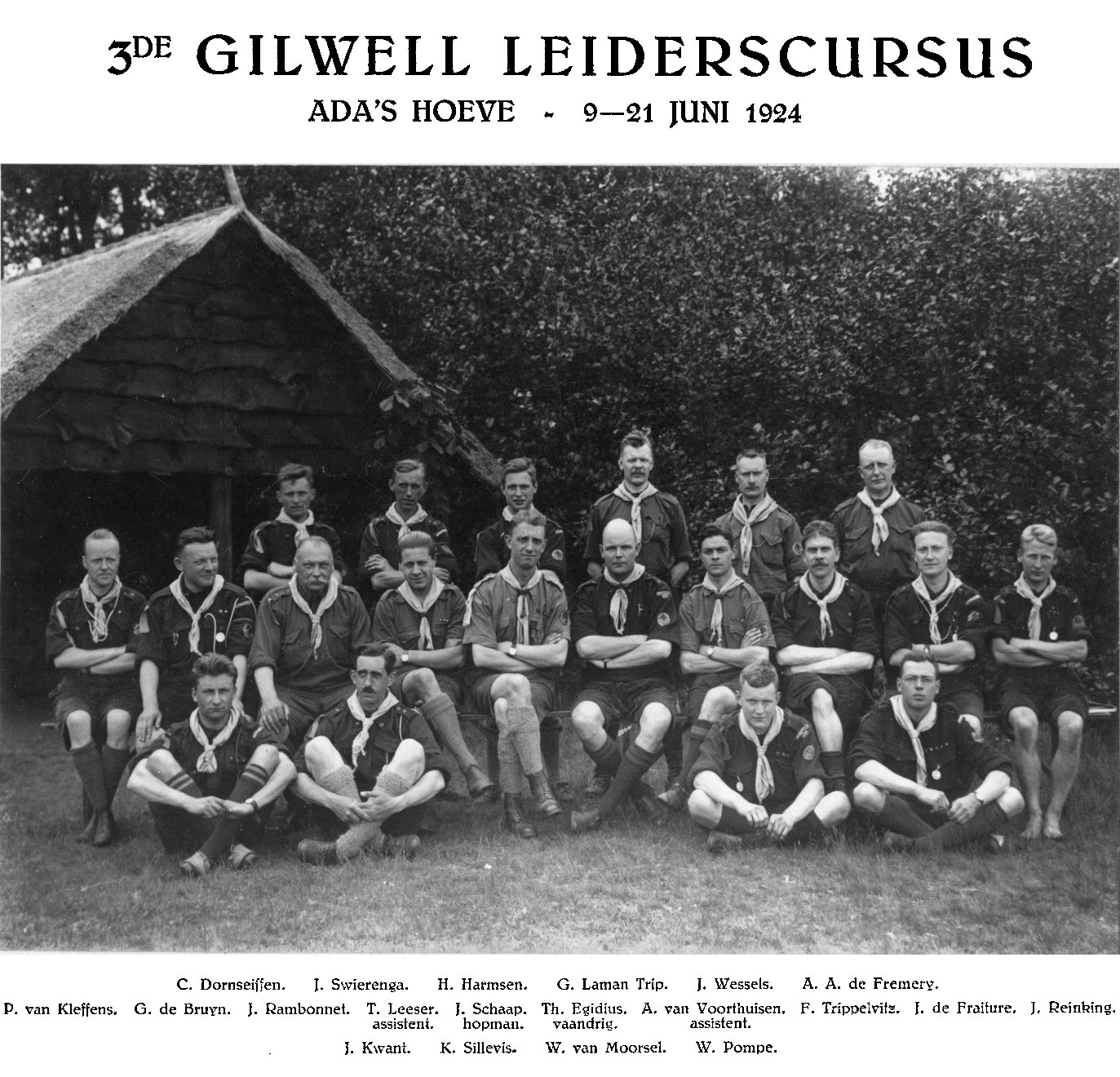
Group picture of the Wood Badge training of Rambonnet

Rambonnet was an important figure in Scouting in the Netherlands in the years before World War II broke out in 1939. His scouting career started in 1920, when the Royal Commissioner, Prince Hendrik, asked Rambonnet to succeed him as chairman of De Nederlandsche Padvinders (NPV, "The Dutch Pathfinders") which was the Scouting organization of the Netherlands. In 1928, the NPV adopted more rules from the United Kingdom, after which Rambonnet was appointed the first Chief Scout of the Netherlands. He continued to hold this position until just after the 5th World Scout Jamboree in 1937. No one served as Chief Scout in the Netherlands again until 24 September 2021, when Freek Vonk was appointed Chief Scout of Scouting Nederland.

Rambonnet received the Silver Wolf Award for his work in Scouting. The Rambonnethuis ("Rambonnet House"), a model for an ideal group house which stood at Gilwell Ada's Hoeve, the Dutch national Scouting campsite in Ommen, from 28 August 1948 to 19 March 1993, was named after Rambonnet. Several scout groups were later named after him, as is Scouting's first mothership for Sea Scouts, the Dutch vessel MS Rambonnet.

== Other work ==
Rambonnet was Vice President of the Royal National Association for Rescue and First Aid in Accidents and received the Grand Cross of Merit of the Netherlands Red Cross for his work. He also was a member of the Honorary Committee for the Naval Monument in 1920.

== Death ==
Rambonnet died on 3 August 1943 and was buried in the General Cemetery in The Hague.

== Honors and awards ==
- Knight 4th class of the Military Order of William (1905)
- Knight of the Order of the Netherlands Lion (1924)
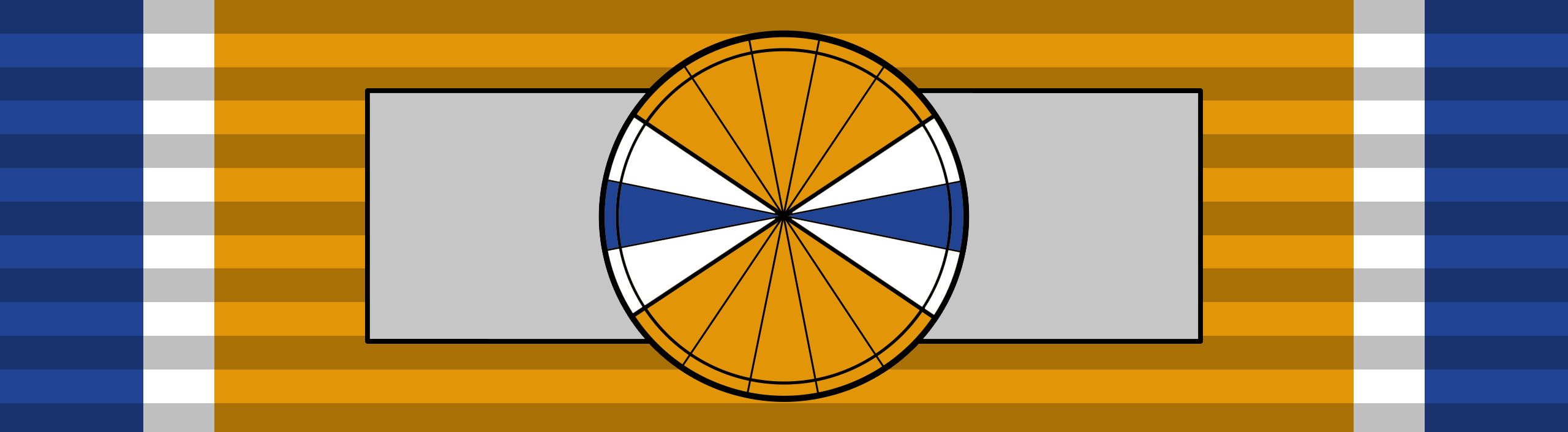
- Commander of the Order of Orange-Nassau with swords (1934)
- Grand Cross of the Order of the Dannebrog (Denmark)
- Officer of the Legion of Honour (France)
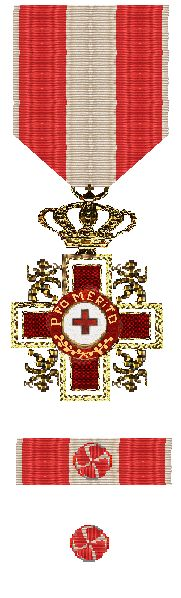
- Cross of Merit of the Netherlands Red Cross
- Silver Wolf Award (The Scout Association)

== See also ==
Political offices
Preceded by Hendrik Colijn	Minister of the Navy; 1913–1918	Succeeded by Bonifacius Cornelis de Jonge
Preceded by Thomas Bastiaan Pleyte	Minister of Colonial Affairs; Acting; 1915–1916	Succeeded by Thomas Bastiaan Pleyte
Preceded by Nicolaas Bosboom	Minister of War; Acting; 1917	Succeeded by Bonifacius Cornelis de Jonge
