= Alidius Tjarda van Starkenborgh Stachouwer =

Dutch politician (1888–1978)

His Excellency, Jonkheer Alidius Tjarda van Starkenborgh Stachouwer
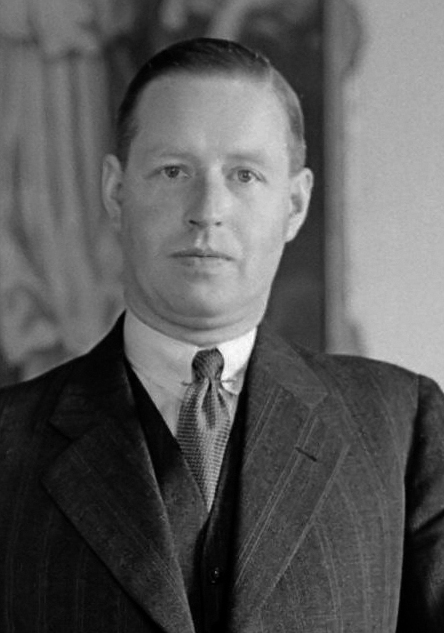
- Alidius Tjarda van Starkenborgh, 1935

Governor-General of the Dutch East Indies
- In office 16 September 1936 – 8 March 1942; De jure until 16 October 1945
- Monarch: Wilhelmina
- Preceded by: Bonifacius Cornelis de Jonge
- Succeeded by: Hubertus van Mook (in exile); Seizaburo Okasaki (as Head of Japanese Military Government)

Queen's Commissioner in Groningen
- In office 1925–1933
- Monarch: Wilhelmina
- Preceded by: Edzard Tjarda van Starkenborgh
- Succeeded by: Joachimus Pieter Fockema Andreae

Personal details
- Born: Alidius Warmoldus Lambertus Tjarda van Starkenborgh Stachouwer; 7 March 1888 Groningen, Netherlands
- Died: 16 August 1978 (aged 90) Wassenaar, Netherlands
- Education: University of Groningen
- Occupation: Politician; diplomat
- Alidius Tjarda van Starkenborgh's voice On the commemoration of the German invasion of the Netherlands; Recorded 10 May 1941

Jonkheer Alidius Warmoldus Lambertus Tjarda van Starkenborgh Stachouwer (7 March 1888 – 16 August 1978) was a Dutch nobleman and statesman, primarily noted for being the last colonial Governor-General of the Dutch East Indies, now Indonesia. He was taken captive after accepting Japan's demands for an unconditional surrender of the islands on 9 March 1942.

Tjarda was the 69th governor-general of the largest Dutch colony in Asia. He served from 1936 to 1942.

He came from an old noble family in Groningen and was the son of Edzard Tjarda van Starkenborgh Stachouwer. His father was mayor of the city of Groningen (1900-1917), member of the Provincial Council of Groningen (1904-1910), member of the Dutch Senate (1910-1917) and Queen's commissioner of the province of Groningen (1917-1925).

Alidius' mother Christine Jacobe Quintus was music teacher and opera soprano. His personal name was Alidius Warmoldus Lambertus, while Tjarda van Starkenborgh Stachouwer was his noble and peerage title. However, historical sources often refer to him as simply Tjarda.

== Early life ==
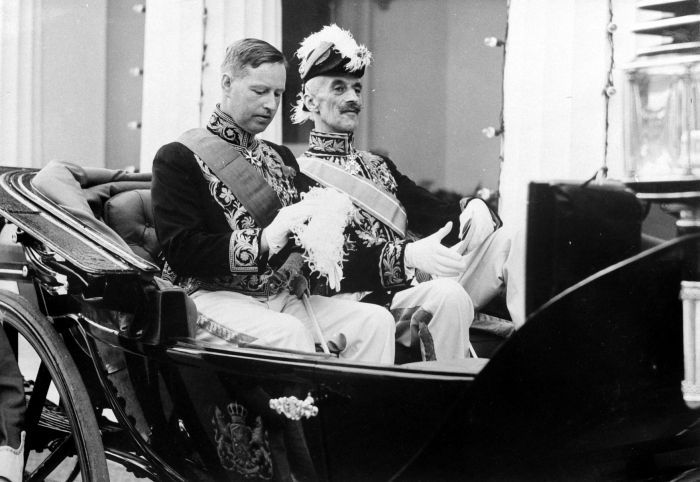
Tjarda van Starkenborgh Stachouwer inspecting his feathered hat after his inauguration as governor-general. Next to him was his predecessor, Cornelis de Jonge.

Tjarda received his primary and secondary education at Praedinius Gymnasium in the city of Groningen and continued his higher education in law at the University of Groningen from 25 September 1906 to 11 April 1911. There he joined the student corps Vindicat atque Polit. After completing his studies, he interned at several law firms from 1911 to 1913 and provided professional assistance to the then Dutch Minister of Foreign Affairs Reneke de Marees van Swinderen before deciding to prepare for the diplomatic service. From 1913 to 1915, after having won a competition for legation secretary, he was appointed deputy to the Dutch Foreign Office.

After his domestic duties, he was sent on his first overseas assignment as general attaché at the Royal Netherlands Embassy in Washington. It was during this period that he met his future wife, Christine Marburg, daughter of Theodore Marburg, the US ambassador to Belgium. They were married in November 1915 in Baltimore, Maryland. He joined the Dutch diplomatic service in 1915.

In 1921, Tjarda was contacted by Foreign Minister Herman Adriaan van Karnebeek to accompany the Dutch delegation to the Washington Naval Conference. It was at this point that Tjarda first came into contact with colonial affairs. In 1922 he joined the office of the International Conference on Russian Trade in The Hague. In this post he campaigned hard for the water connection with the Zuiderzee, organized the provincial school doctor service, the academic hospital and the university, of which he was curator from 1928. After an international career, in 1924/25, he was at the Dutch Legation in Berlin and.he was appointed Queen's Commissioner (royal governor) for the Province of Groningen (1925-1933), succeeding his father, and Ambassador of the Kingdom of the Netherlands in Brussels (1933-1936). He was secretary and then legation counselor at the Dutch embassies in Copenhagen, Stockholm and Berlin from 1915 to 1933. In September 1933, van Starkenborgh was appointed Extraordinary Ambassador and Minister Plenipotentiary to the Belgian and Luxembourg courts.

On 4 June 1936, a royal decree was issued appointing him Governor-General of the Dutch East Indies. He boarded the Johan van Oldenbarnevelt for the Dutch East Indies after saying goodbye to Queen Wilhelmina at a meeting on 24 August 1936. The official handover ceremony was held on 16 September 1936 in Batavia.

== Second World War ==
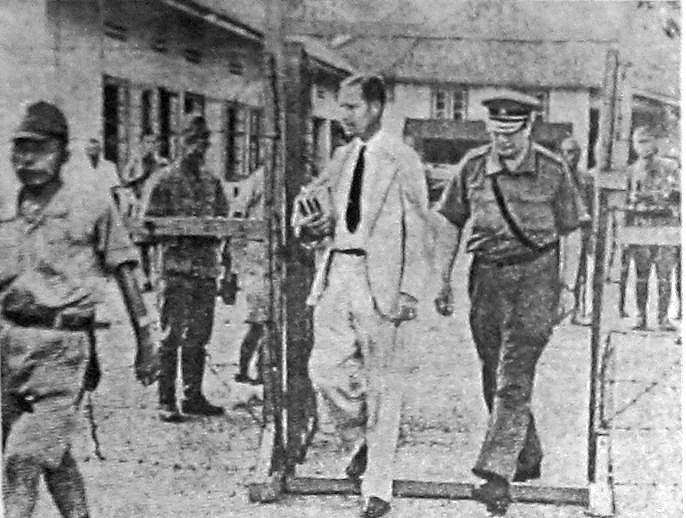
Governor General Tjarda van Starkenborgh Stachouwer, bringing his books, and Lt. Gen. Hein ter Poorten arriving at the encampment of the 10th battalion in Batavia for their internment

When the Netherlands surrendered to Germany on 14 May 1940, Jhr. van Starkenborgh declared martial law in the Dutch East Indies, ordering 19 German cargo ships to be seized and all German nationals to be interned pending the liberation of the Netherlands. In December 1941, when Japan began operations in the Pacific, there were 93,000 Dutch troops and 5,000 American, British, and Australian soldiers to defend against an invasion of the Dutch East Indies.

By 15 February, Japanese bombers were attacking the capital at Batavia (now Jakarta) and government operations were forced to move the capital to Bandoeng, specifically to the Savoy Homann Hotel and Preanger Hotel. The Governor-General and several important officials then decided to stay elsewhere, at Vila Mei Ling. Starkenborgh, recognizing the absolute impossibility of the allied troops and the local population to defend themselves as they were short of ammunition and exhausted by disease, negotiated the surrender. From here, Tjarda's entourage went to meet Lieutenant General Hitoshi Imamura of the Imperial Japanese Army's 16th Army, which led the Dutch East Indies Campaign, on 8 March 1942. At the first meeting, they set a deadline for the unconditional surrender of the Dutch East Indies. Jhr. van Starkenborgh ordered the Dutch and Allied troops to cease fire in a broadcast the next day, and the Allied forces surrendered at 1:00 p.m. By the time of the signing of the capitulation by General Hein ter Poorten, Tjarda had left the negotiating room in dismay. Earlier, on 5 March 1942, Tjarda had separated civilian and military power and transferred military power to Ter Poorten. He then did not surrender civilian power over the Dutch East Indies at the Capitulation of Kalijati. This action was used as a basis for the Dutch to transfer civilian power to Lieutenant Governor-General Hubertus van Mook who had exiled himself to Australia. Thanks to his initiative, this legitimisation was used to form the Netherlands Indies Civil Administration (NICA) in exile in Australia. He entered Japanese custody after the unconditional surrender of the entire Royal Netherlands East Indies Army in the Capitulation of Kalijati on 8 or 9 March 1942.

Tjarda van Starkenborgh, his family, and other Dutch East Indies military and government personnel were then taken prisoner. While the Japanese offered him to let him stay at his home under house arrest and receive special treatment he refused, wanting to stay together. He was then separated from his wife, Christine, and his two daughters, who were interned in a different POW camp in Bandoeng. Tjarda was initially held captive in Bandoeng, before being transferred to Batavia, and finally to Manchuria, specifically in Hsi'en County (now Liaoyuan, China), where he was held along with other notable prisoners, such as US General Jonathan M. Wainwright, until the camp was liberated by the Soviets on 16 August 1945.

== Post-war life ==
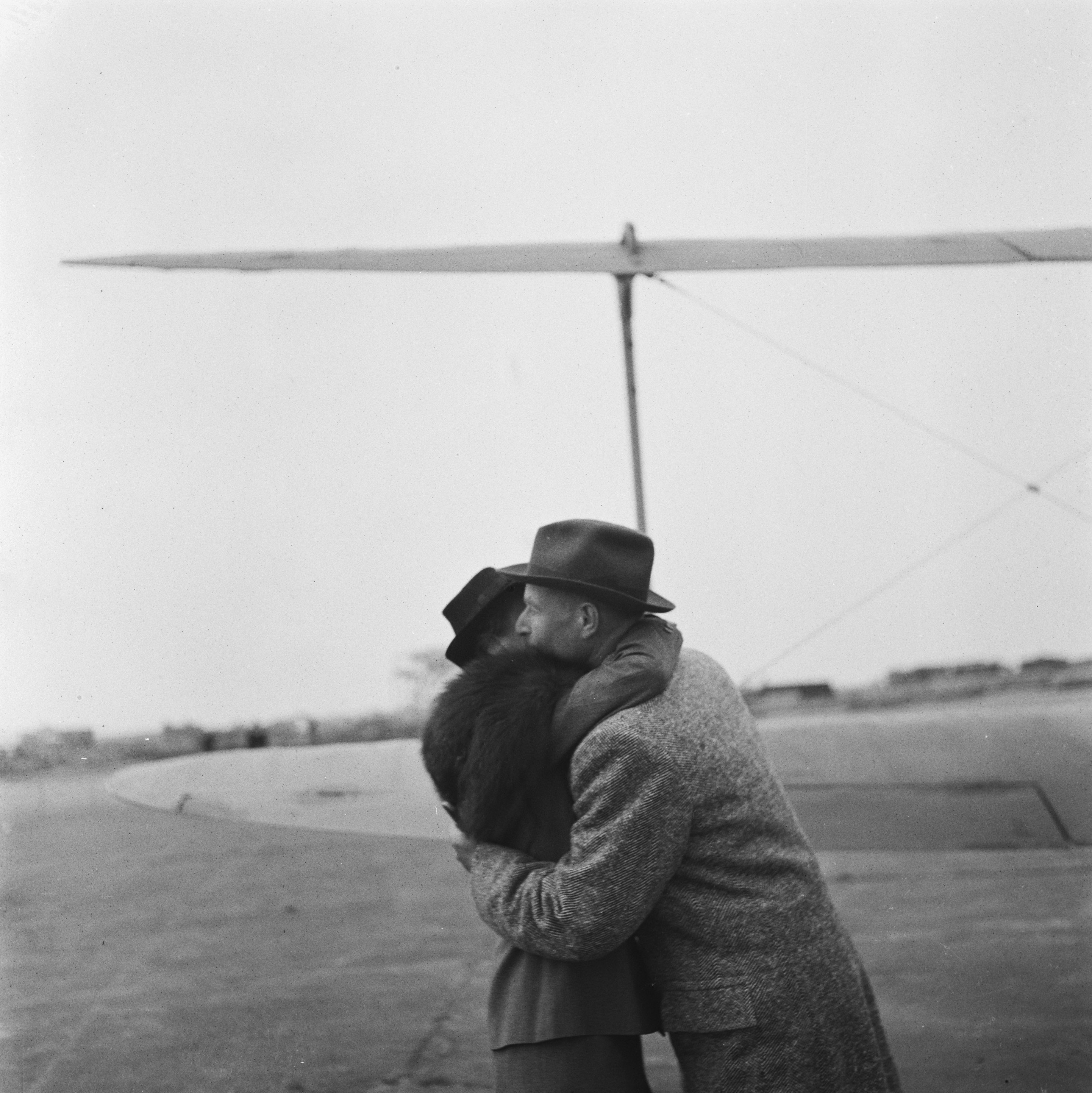
Tjarda van Starkenborg Stachouwer reuniting with his beloved (9 September 1945)

Jhr. van Starkenborgh returned to the Netherlands with his family. Initially, he was offered a direct request from Queen Wilhelmina to return as governor-general (or an equivalent successor post) but refused to have anything to do with Indonesia or the East Indies and its decolonisation process, in that the Queen had pledged self-government to Indonesia in 1942. He returned his mandate as governor-general in mid-October 1945 due to a difference of opinion with the Minister of Overseas Territories (formerly Minister of Colonies) Johann Heinrich Adolf Logemann, with expressions of gratitude for the "important services he had rendered to his country under incomparably difficult circumstances." He resigned effective 16 October 1945, thus the position of Governor-General of the Dutch East Indies ceased to exist. Instead, at the beginning of 1946 he was appointed ambassador to France in Paris, but after only two years he asked for his release, which he was granted on 1 December 1948. In 1950 he returned to the country's service and became the Netherlands' permanent representative to the North Atlantic Council in London. From March 1952 to mid-1956 he headed the first permanent Dutch representation to NATO in Paris. During this time he played a key role in the preparations for the establishment of a European Political Community. On 28 June 1956 he was appointed Minister of State.

He then retired from the diplomatic service, settled in Wassenaar and continued to serve as chairman of the Carnegie Foundation. After his retirement as a diplomat, he accepted a new appointment by the government as Minister of State from 28 June 1956 to 16 August 1978 and became a member of the Beel committee. He later took over the leadership of the delegation for the negotiations on a long-standing argument over canal connections with Belgium, which had been dormant since the Second World War, especially the connection of the Scheldt with the Rhine, which Belgium had demanded. The negotiations were successfully concluded with a treaty on 13 May 1963. With Gerbrandy and Beel, he formed an advisory committee on the Greet Hofmans affair.

He died in the Netherlands on 16 August 1978 and was buried in Wassenaar.

== Honors ==
- Grand Cross of the Order of Orange-Nassau
- Knight Grand Cross of the Order of the Netherlands Lion
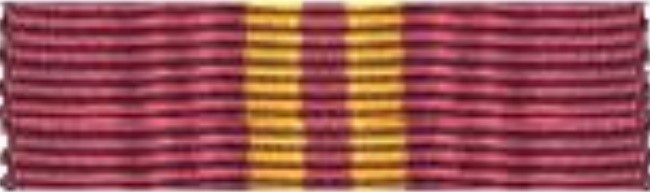
- Resistance Star of East Asia 1942–1945 (10 May 1950)
- Honorary Doctor of Philology and Philosophy from the University of Groningen (20 March 1957)
- Honorary Doctor of Literature and Philosophy from the University of Paris

Political offices
Preceded by Bonifacius Cornelis de Jonge	Governor-General of the Dutch East Indies; 1936–1942	Succeeded by Hubertus van Mook
