= Bonifacius Cornelis de Jonge =

Dutch politician and aristocrat (1875–1958)

Jonkheer Bonifacius Cornelis de Jonge
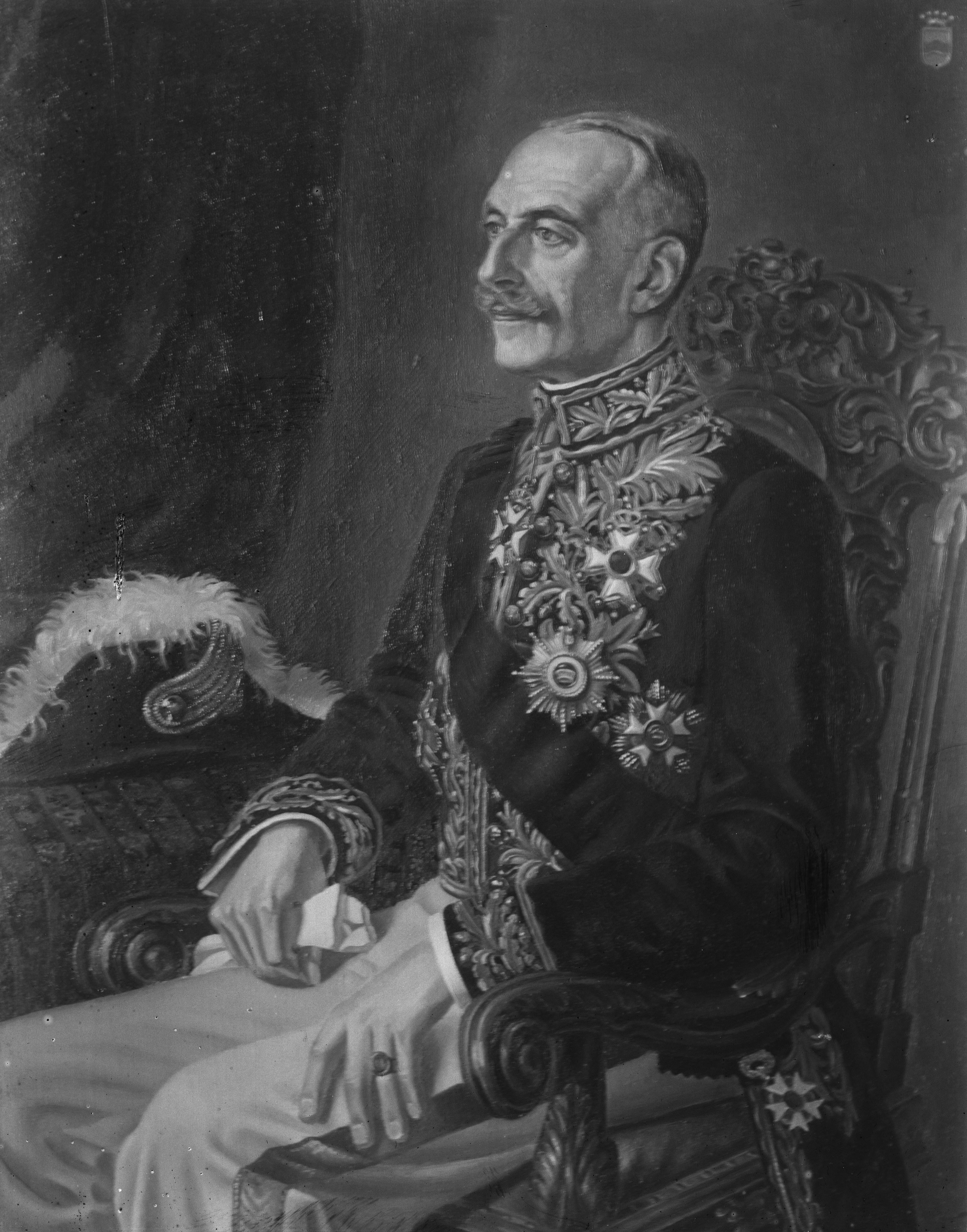
- Portrait by Jan Frank, c. 1935

Governor-General of the Dutch East Indies
- In office 12 September 1931 – 16 September 1936
- Monarch: Wilhelmina
- Preceded by: Andries Cornelis Dirk de Graeff
- Succeeded by: Alidius Tjarda van Starkenborgh

Minister of War
- In office 15 June 1917 – 9 September 1918
- Prime Minister: Pieter Cort van der Linden
- Preceded by: Nicolaas Bosboom
- Succeeded by: George Alting von Geusau

Personal details
- Born: 22 January 1875 The Hague, Netherlands
- Died: 24 June 1958 (aged 83) Zeist, Netherlands
- Party: Christian Historical Union

Bonifacius Cornelis de Jonge (22 January 1875 – 24 June 1958) was a Dutch politician and aristocrat who served as governor-general of the Dutch East Indies from 1931 to 1936. A member of the Christian Historical Union (CHU), he previously served as Minister of War from 1917 to 1918.

== Early life ==
Bonifacius Cornelis de Jonge was born on 22 January 1875, in The Hague, Netherlands. He was the son of Mr. Bonifacius Cornelis de Jonge (1834–1907), president of the District Court of The Hague and then a judge in the Supreme Court of the Netherlands, and Elisabeth Henrietta Maria Philipse (1839–1927). On 5 July 1904, de Jonge married Anna Cornelia Baroness of Wassenaer (1883–1959), founder and chairman of the General Support Fund for Indigenous Persons. Together, had four children.

== Political career ==
=== Early career ===
De Jonge began his career as a civil servant. In 1917, he joined the Christian Historical Union (CHU) and was appointed Minister of War in the Cort van der Linden cabinet. Responsible for maintaining Dutch neutrality in World War I, de Jonge was further appointed interim Minister of the Navy on 28 June 1918. He remained Minister in both portfolios until the fall of the government at the 1918 general election.

Following the end of the war, de Jonge briefly serve as an attaché to the viceroy of the Dutch colony of Surinam. He was later appointed by the government of Hendrikus Colijn to serve on the board of the Bataafse Petroleum Maatschappij. He also refused appointments as Minister for War, Minister of War and Navy (1922), Queen's Commissioner in Utrecht (1924), and mayor of Rotterdam (1928).

=== Governor-general ===
In 1931, de Jonge became governor-general of the Dutch East Indies. As governor-general, he was opposed to any form of Indonesian nationalism and unwilling to see the Volksraad, the semi-legislative body of the colony, play any significant role. Under his rule, the repressiveness of the colonial government increased, with political meetings being frequently broken up by the police and speakers arrested. He reversed the plan of his predecessor to gradually close the Boven-Digoel concentration camp, and continued to use it as a place of exile for nationalist figures. A year into his tenure, the colonial administration announced the Wild School Ordinance which required permission from the authorities before any private school without a government subsidy could be established. (Note: A government subsidy meant that a school was put under government supervision.) Organized nationalist opposition ultimately resulted in de Jonge suspending the ordinance in 1933.

He left the position on 16 September 1936. He was replaced by Alidius Tjarda van Starkenborgh Stachouwer. He died on 24 June 1958, in Zeist, Netherlands.

== Footnotes ==
Political offices
Preceded by Andries Cornelis Dirk de Graeff	Governor-General of the Dutch East Indies; 1931–1936	Succeeded by Alidius Tjarda van Starkenborgh
Preceded by Jean Jacques Rambonnet	Minister of War; 1917–1918	Succeeded by George Alting von Geusau
Preceded by Jean Jacques Rambonnet	Acting Minister of the Navy; 1918	Succeeded by George Alting von Geusau
