= Dutch East Indies campaign =

Conquest of Indonesia by Japan, 1941–1942

- Part of the Pacific Theatre of World War II
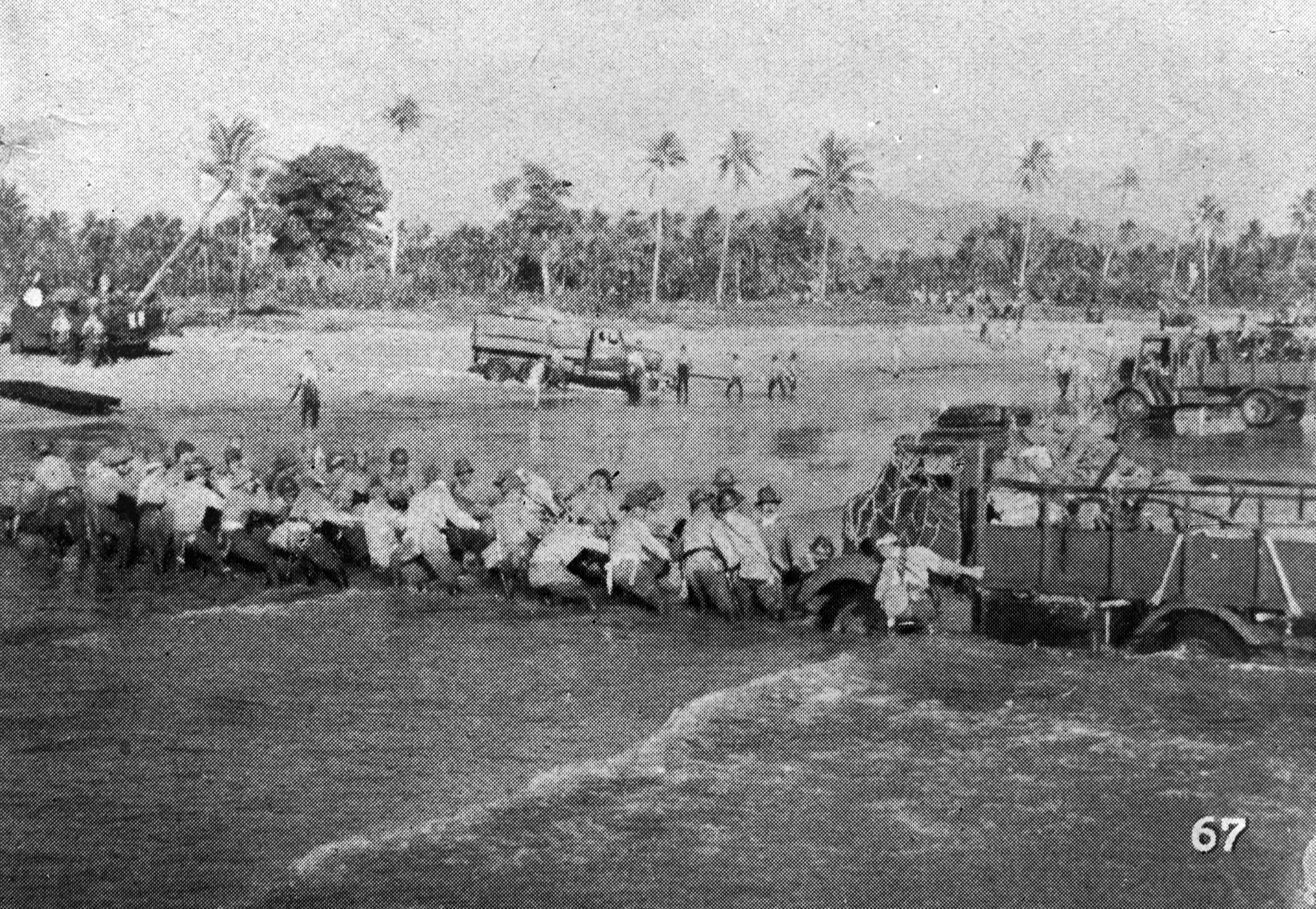
- Japanese forces land on Java.
Date	January 11 – March 9, 1942 (1 month, 3 weeks and 5 days)
Location	Dutch East Indies
Result	Japanese victory
Territorial changes	Japanese occupation of the Dutch East Indies

Belligerents
ABDA Command: Netherlands: Dutch East Indies; United Kingdom; United States; Australia; New Zealand	Japan

Commanders and leaders
(United Kingdom) Archibald Wavell (Netherlands) A. T. van Starkenborgh (surrendered) (Netherlands) Hein ter Poorten (surrendered) (United States) Thomas C. Hart (Netherlands) Conrad Helfrich (Netherlands) Karel Doorman † (United Kingdom) Richard Peirse (United States) George Brett	(Empire of Japan) Hisaichi Terauchi (Empire of Japan) Kiyotake Kawaguchi (Empire of Japan) Ibō Takahashi (Empire of Japan) Hitoshi Imamura (Empire of Japan) Shōji Nishimura (Empire of Japan) Jisaburō Ozawa (Empire of Japan) Takeo Takagi (Empire of Japan) Nobutake Kondō

Strength
148,000: 100,000 local forces; 40,000 Dutch regulars; 8,000 Anglo-American regulars; 33 warships 41 submarines 234 aircraft	52 warships 18 submarines 107,800 personnel 193 tanks & tankettes 2,017 guns & mortars 5,898 motor vehicles 11,750 horses 609 aircraft

Casualties and losses
2,384 killed 100,000+ captured 24 Allied ships sunk (9 American, 9 Dutch, 5 British, 1 Australian): 1 seaplane tender 2 heavy cruisers 3 light cruisers 1 coastal defense ship 15 destroyers 1 oil tanker 1 gunboat 5,000–10,000 sailors and Marines killed on the sunken ships thousands of sailors and Marines captured	671 killed

The Dutch East Indies campaign of 1941–1942 was the conquest of the Dutch East Indies (present-day Indonesia) by forces of the Empire of Japan in the early days of the Pacific campaign of World War II. Allied forces attempted unsuccessfully to defend the islands. The East Indies were targeted by the Japanese for their rich oil resources which would become a vital asset during the war. The campaign and subsequent three-and-a-half-year Japanese occupation was also a major factor in the end of Dutch colonial rule in the region.

== Background ==
The East Indies was one of Japan's primary targets if and when it went to war because the colony possessed abundant valuable resources, the most important of which were its rubber plantations and oil fields; the colony was the fourth-largest exporter of oil in the world, behind the US, Iran, and Romania. The oil made the islands enormously important to the Japanese, so they sought to secure the supply for themselves. They sent four fleet carriers (Akagi, Kaga, Hiryū, and Sōryū) and a light carrier along with the four fast battleships of the Kongō class, 13 heavy cruisers, and many light cruisers and destroyers to support their amphibious assaults in addition to conducting raids on cities, naval units and shipping in both that area and around the Indian Ocean.

Access to oil was the main goal of the Japanese war effort, as Japan lacked native source of oil; it could not produce enough to meet even 10% of its needs, even with the extraction of oil shale in Manchuria using the Fushun process. Japan quickly lost 93% of its oil supply after President Franklin D. Roosevelt issued an executive order on 26 July 1941 which froze all of Japan's US assets and embargoed all oil exports to Japan. In addition, the Dutch government-in-exile, at the urging of the Allies and with the support of Queen Wilhelmina, broke its economic treaty with Japan and joined the embargo in August. Japan's military and economic reserves included only a year and a half's worth of oil. As a US declaration of war against Japan was feared if the latter took the East Indies, the Japanese planned to eliminate the US Pacific Fleet, allowing them to take over the islands; this led to the attack on Pearl Harbor.

== Declaration of war ==
In late November, the Netherlands government in the East Indies under the Dutch government-in-exile (already at war with Imperial Japan's Axis power ally Germany in Europe) began preparing for war against Japan itself: ships of the Royal Netherlands Navy were sent to sea and the KNIL Air Force was mobilised. On 4 December, three days after having decided on a policy of war against America, Britain and the Netherlands, the Japanese government decided instead to "treat the Netherlands as a quasi enemy until actual hostilities ... occur." This was in the hope that the Dutch would not preemptively destroy oil installations before the Japanese were ready to invade.

On 8 December 1941, in a public proclamation, the Netherlands declared war on Japan. By 07:00 on the day of the attack, the East Indies government had warned merchantmen at sea to make for the nearest port. At that hour, the governor general made a public announcement over the radio that the Netherlands "accepts the challenge and takes up arms against the Japanese Empire." Instructions had been telegraphed to the embassy in Tokyo at 02:30, even before news of the attack on Pearl Harbor had reached the Dutch government in London at 04:00. The instructions were only received on the evening of the next day, and the declaration of war was finally handed to the Japanese foreign minister, Shigenori Tōgō, by the Dutch ambassador, J. C. Pabst, on the morning of 10 December. The Swedish ambassador agreed to handle Dutch interests for the duration of the conflict.

The Dutch declaration did not alter the Japanese decision, and the latter's declaration of war did not come until 11 January 1942. When Japan was charged with waging a "war of aggression" before the International Military Tribunal for the Far East in 1946, it was argued that her attitude towards the Netherlands proved otherwise, since the Dutch had declared war first. The tribunal rejected this, on the grounds that Japan's sole intention was "to give less time to the Netherlands for destroying oil wells." They found that the Netherlands' declaration was in self-defence.

== Campaign ==
General Hisaichi Terauchi, commander of the Southern Expeditionary Army Group, began the campaign by sending the 16th Army under command of General Hitoshi Imamura to attack Borneo. On 17 December 1941 Japanese forces landed at Miri, an oil production centre in northern Sarawak, with support from a battleship, an aircraft carrier, three cruisers and four destroyers.

Initially, the Japanese launched air strikes on key areas and gained air superiority. Following the air strikes, landings were made at several locations, targeting airfields and other important points in the area. In addition to the landing at Miri, forces made landings at Seria, Kuching, Jesselton, and Sandakan between 15 December 1941 and 19 January 1942. After these main objectives in Borneo were achieved, the Japanese planned a three-pronged assault southward using three forces named Eastern Force, Center Force and Western Force. The goal was to capture the oil resources of the East Indies. The Eastern Force was to advance from Jolo and Davao and move on to capture Celebes, Amboina, and Timor, while protecting the Center Force's flank. The Center Force was to capture oil fields and airfields in Tarakan Island and Balikpapan. Both these forces would support the Western Force, which was to attack and capture the oil refineries and airfields in Palembang. The Japanese launched their assault on 11 January and landed at Tarakan.

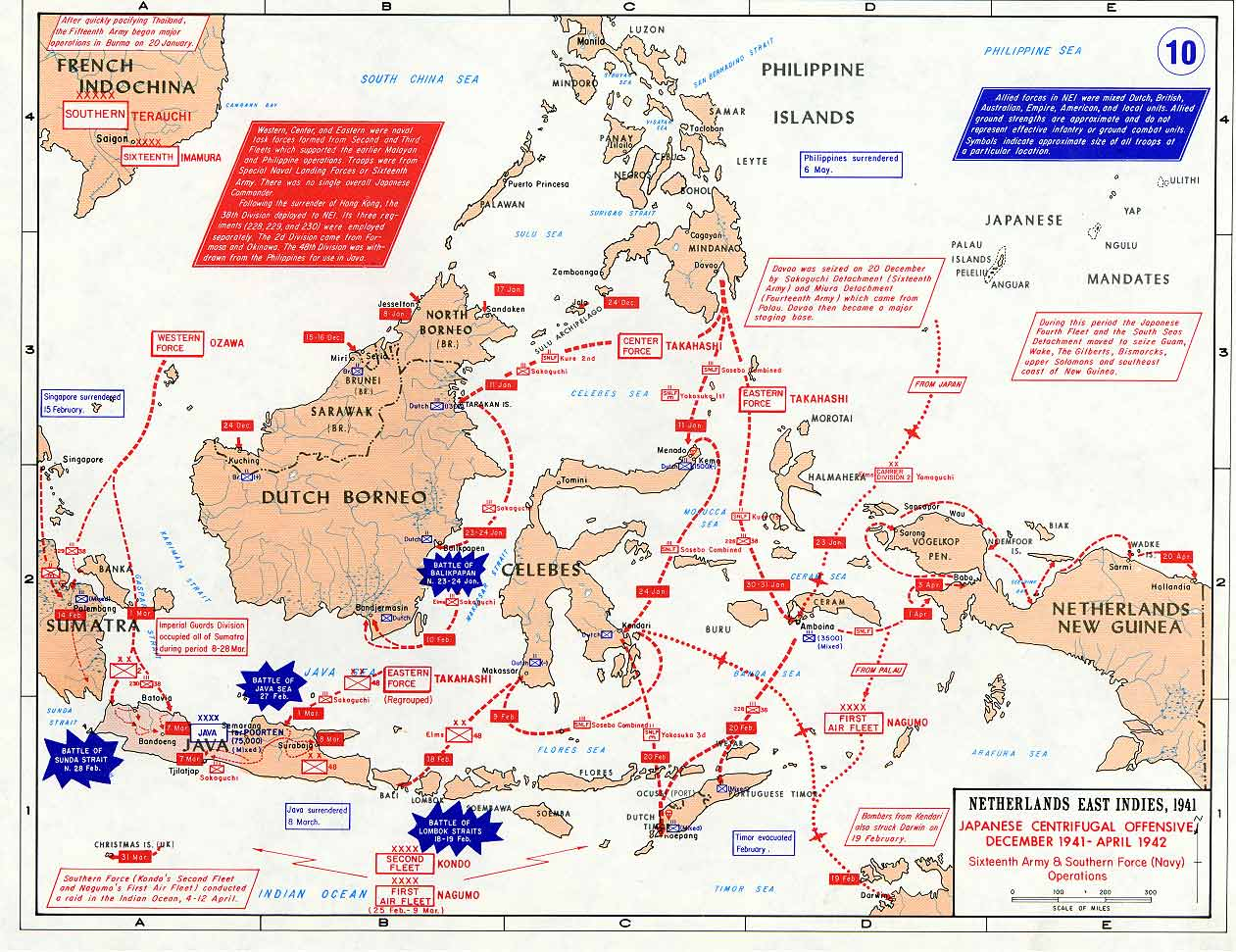
The Japanese lines of advance in the Dutch East Indies, Sarawak and North Borneo (British), and Portuguese Timor

To coordinate the fight against the Japanese, the American, British, Dutch, and Australian forces combined all available land and sea forces under the American-British-Dutch-Australian Command (ABDACOM or ABDA) banner. This command was activated on 15 January 1942, commanded by British field marshal Sir Archibald Wavell. The command structure had the American Army Air Force lieutenant general George Brett as deputy commander, the British lieutenant general Henry Royds Pownall as chief of staff; under them were the American admiral Thomas C. Hart as naval commander, the Dutch lieutenant general Hein ter Poorten as ground forces commander, and the British air chief marshal Sir Richard Peirse as the air commander. Although the forces were combined, they had differing priorities: the British believed the defense of the territory of Singapore and the eastern entrances to the Indian Ocean (the route to British Ceylon and British India) to be paramount; the Americans and Australians did not want a total penetration of Southeast Asia that would deprive them of bases necessary for any serious counterattack; and the Dutch considered Java and Sumatra, their "second homeland where [they] had been trading and living for over three centuries", to be the most important place to defend.

Even the combined forces could not stop or even slow the Japanese advance because of their much greater numbers; to face the attacking naval forces, the ABDA command had a conglomerate of ships drawn from any available units, which included the US Asiatic Fleet (fresh from the fall of the Philippines), a few British and Australian surface ships, and Dutch units, such as the Dutch East Indies Squadron, that had previously been stationed in the East Indies. Major forces included two seaplane tenders (USS Langley and Childs), two heavy cruisers (USS Houston and HMS Exeter), seven light cruisers (HNLMS De Ruyter, Java and Tromp, USS Marblehead and Boise (though Boise was forced to leave the area after striking a shoal on January 21), HMAS Hobart and Perth), 22 destroyers, and, perhaps their greatest strength, 25 American and 16 Dutch submarines. Being based on Java, these ships had to take on the central and western prongs of the three-headed Japanese assault.

The Central Force's combat ships included the light carrier Ryūjō, the seaplane tenders Sanyo Maru and Sanuki Maru, three light cruisers, and 16 destroyers, while the Western Force contained five heavy cruisers and seven destroyers. In addition, four Japanese fleet carriers (Akagi, Kaga, Hiryū and Sōryū) and the four Kongō-class battleships were in the theater of operation.

The manner of the Japanese advance resembled the insidious yet irresistible clutching of multiple tentacles. Like some vast octopus it relied on strangling many small points rather than concentration on a vital organ. No one arm attempted to meet the entire strength of the ABDA fleet. Each fastened on a small portion of the enemy and, by crippling him locally, finished by killing the entire animal. [...] The Japanese spread their tentacles cautiously, never extending beyond the range of land-based aircraft unless they had carrier support. The distance of each advance was determined by the radius of fighter planes under their control. This range was generally less than 400 miles, but the Japanese made these short hops in surprisingly rapid succession. Amphibious operations, preceded by air strikes and covered by air power developed with terrifying regularity. Before the Allies had consolidated a new position, they were confronted with a system of air bases from which enemy aircraft operated on their front, flanks and even rear.

The Japanese were using Tarakan airfield as a forward airbase by 17 January, and Balikpapan was captured a week later. However, the Dutch garrisons had destroyed the oil fields before they were captured by the Japanese in both cases. Several Japanese vessels were destroyed or damaged by Allied naval and air counterattacks, but the defending Dutch battalions were overrun. By 28 January, the Japanese had taken control of the airfields at Balikpapan, and their aircraft were operating from them. By the end of January, Japanese forces had captured parts of the Celebes and Dutch Borneo, and by February they had landed on Sumatra and encouraged a revolt in Aceh.

Most of the naval components of the Allied forces were crushed in the battles of Java Sea, Sunda Strait, and Second Java Sea; the only American ship larger than a destroyer to survive the battles was the old cruiser Marblehead. In addition, the land forces on the islands were quickly overwhelmed, and most major resistance was overcome within two months of the initial assaults, although a guerrilla campaign in Timor was successfully waged for a time. The ABDA command was dissolved 1 March, less than two months after its inception, by Admiral Conrad Helfrich.

== Surrender ==
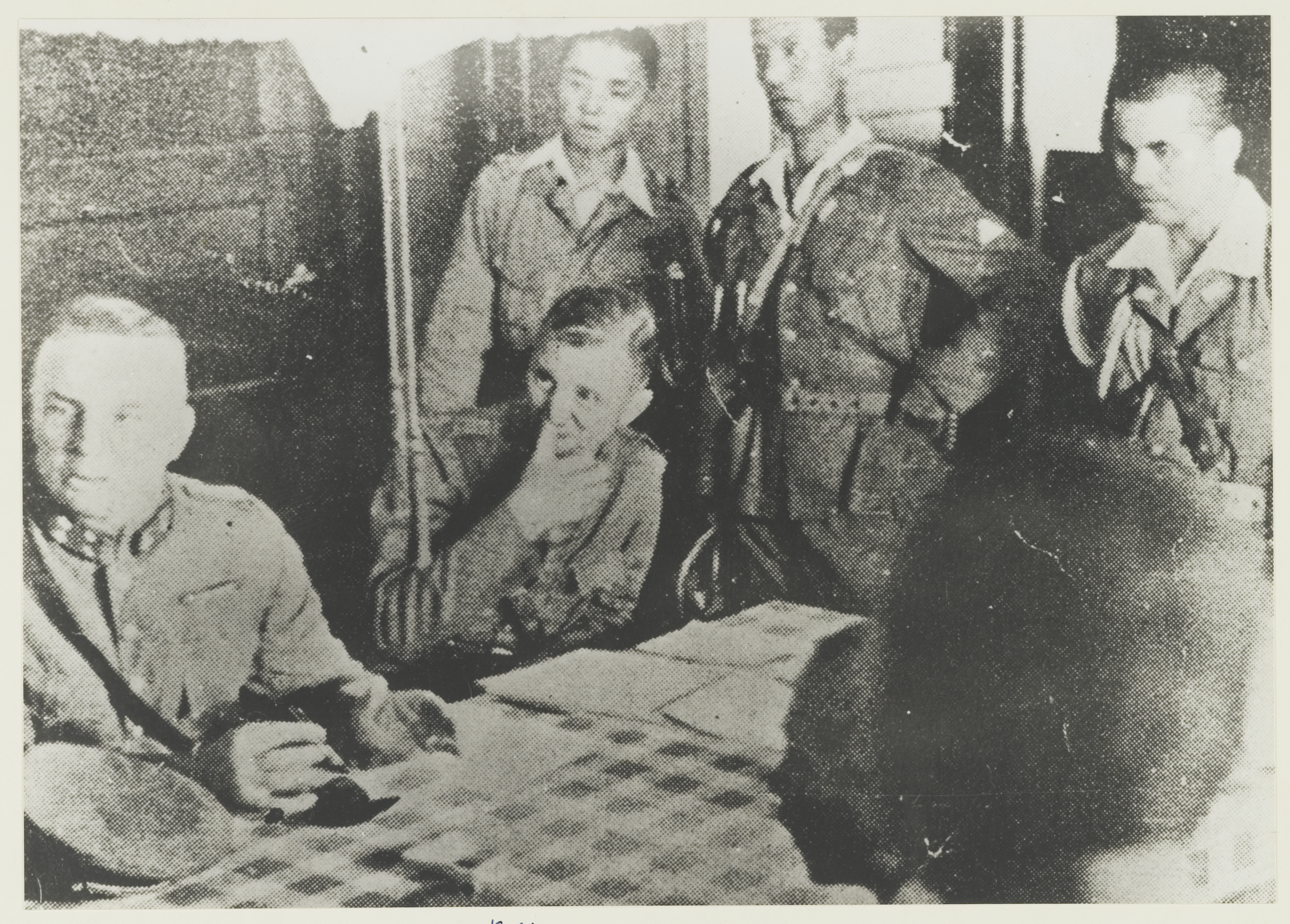
Dutch delegation at Kalijati during the negotiation for Dutch surrender

On 8 March 1942, the Dutch surrendered without condition to Japan in the Kalijati Airfield at Kalijati, Subang, West Java. This is also known as the Kalijati treaty. On 9 March, the Dutch Commander-in-Chief of Allied forces on Java, Lieutenant General Hein ter Poorten, surrendered along with Governor General Jonkheer A. W. L. Tjarda van Starkenborgh Stachouwer. Ter Poorten's surrender announcement was made without consulting the commanders of the British and US forces, who wanted to continue fighting but who had no choice but to comply with the surrender.

Announcer Bert Garthoff gained fame by concluding NIROM's broadcasts on the day of the surrender to Japan during the Dutch East Indies campaign on 8 March 1942 with the words "Listeners we're closing now. Farewell, until better days. Long live the Fatherland, long live the Queen." Garthoff later said that the station's employees were told by the Japanese authorities to "carry on as usual". This they did by concluding the broadcasts with the Dutch National Anthem, much to the surprise of the listeners. When the Japanese found out about this, they executed three NIROM employees in retaliation.

The military power of the Netherlands Indies was never calculated to wage war single-handed against the Japanese empire. For such purposes it is, to begin with, entirely inadequate... Our troops have suffered heavy losses, because of the impossibility of protecting them against the enemy's air attacks; they are exhausted... May God be with us. Long live the queen!

— Ter Poorten announcing the surrender on radio, 9 March 1942

== Aftermath ==
Allied forces did not attempt to retake the islands of Java, Sumatra, Timor, or Bali during the war. Japanese forces on those islands surrendered at the conclusion of World War II. Most of the Japanese military personnel and civilian colonial administrators were repatriated to Japan following the war, except for several hundred who were detained for investigations of war crimes, for which some were later put on trial. About 1,000 Japanese soldiers deserted from their units and assimilated into local communities. Many of these soldiers provided assistance to Indonesian Republican forces during the Indonesian National Revolution.

== Battles of the campaign ==
- Battle of Borneo (1941–1942)
- Battle of Manado (1942)
- Battle of Tarakan (1942)
- Battle of Balikpapan (1942)
- Battle of Kendari (1942)
- Battle of Samarinda (1942)
- Battle of Banjarmasin (1942)
- Battle of Ambon (1942)
- Battle of Palembang (1942)
- Battle of Makassar Strait
- Battle of Badung Strait (1942)
- Battle of the Java Sea (1942)
- Second Battle of the Java Sea (1942)
- Battle of Sunda Strait (1942)
- Battle of Java (1942)
- Battle of Timor (1942–1943)
