= Thomas Bastiaan Pleyte =

Dutch politician

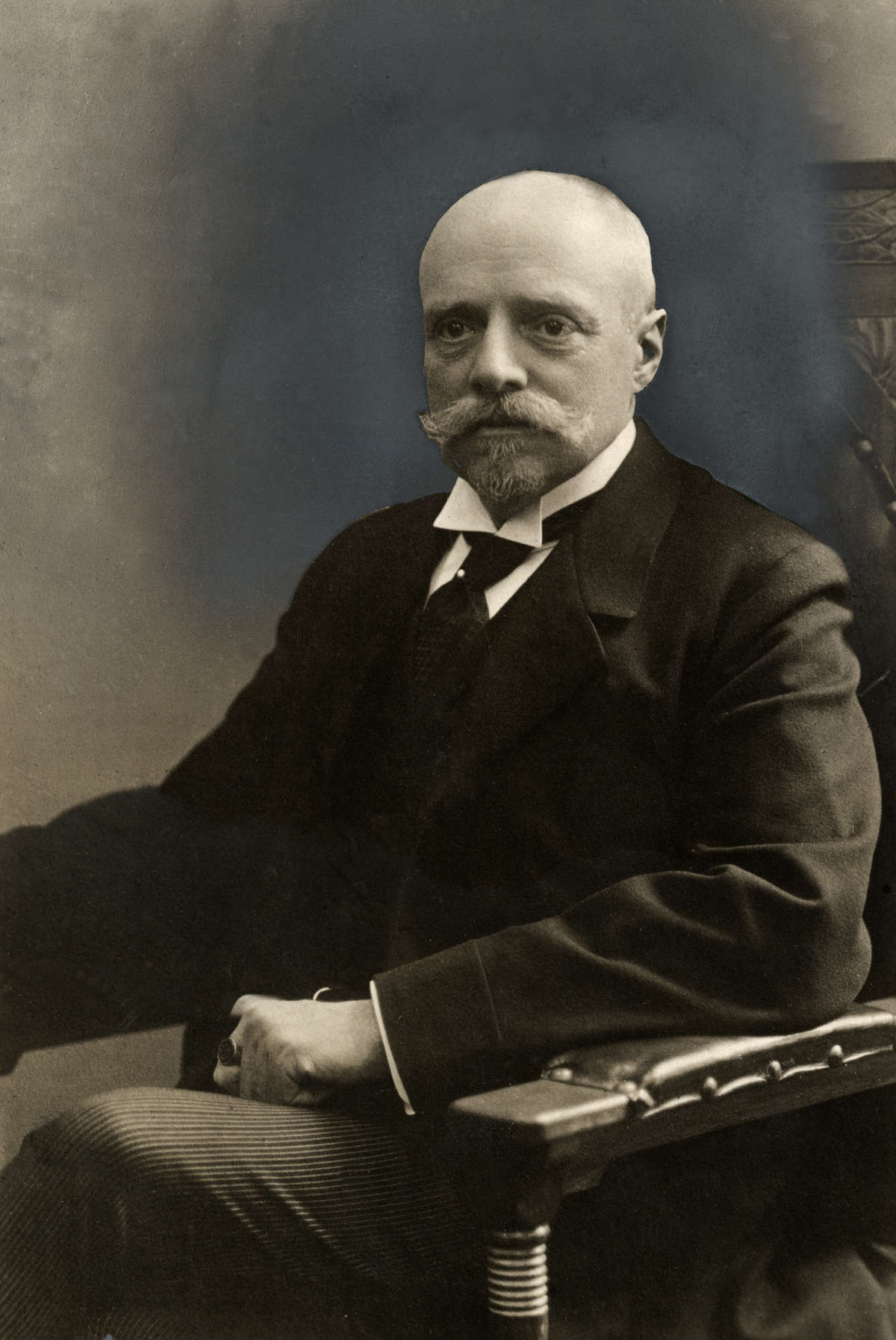
Thomas B. Pleyte in 1913

Thomas Bastiaan Pleyte (23 October 1864 in Leiden – 25 March 1926 in The Hague) was a Dutch politician.

Pleyte was Minister of the Colonies in the cabinet of Pieter Cort van der Linden. He became known as a liberal minister who founded the People's Council in 1916, a move that is widely regarded as the important first step to give the native population of the Netherlands East Indies (now Indonesia) an equal say in government. Pleyte was fluent in Malay and Javanese.

Political offices
Preceded by Jan Hendrik de Waal Malefijt	Minister of Colonial Affairs; 1913–1916	Succeeded by Jean Jacques Rambonnet; Acting
Preceded by Jean Jacques Rambonnet; Acting	Minister of Colonial Affairs; 1917–1918	Succeeded by Alexander Willem Frederik Idenburg
