= Hein ter Poorten =

Dutch general

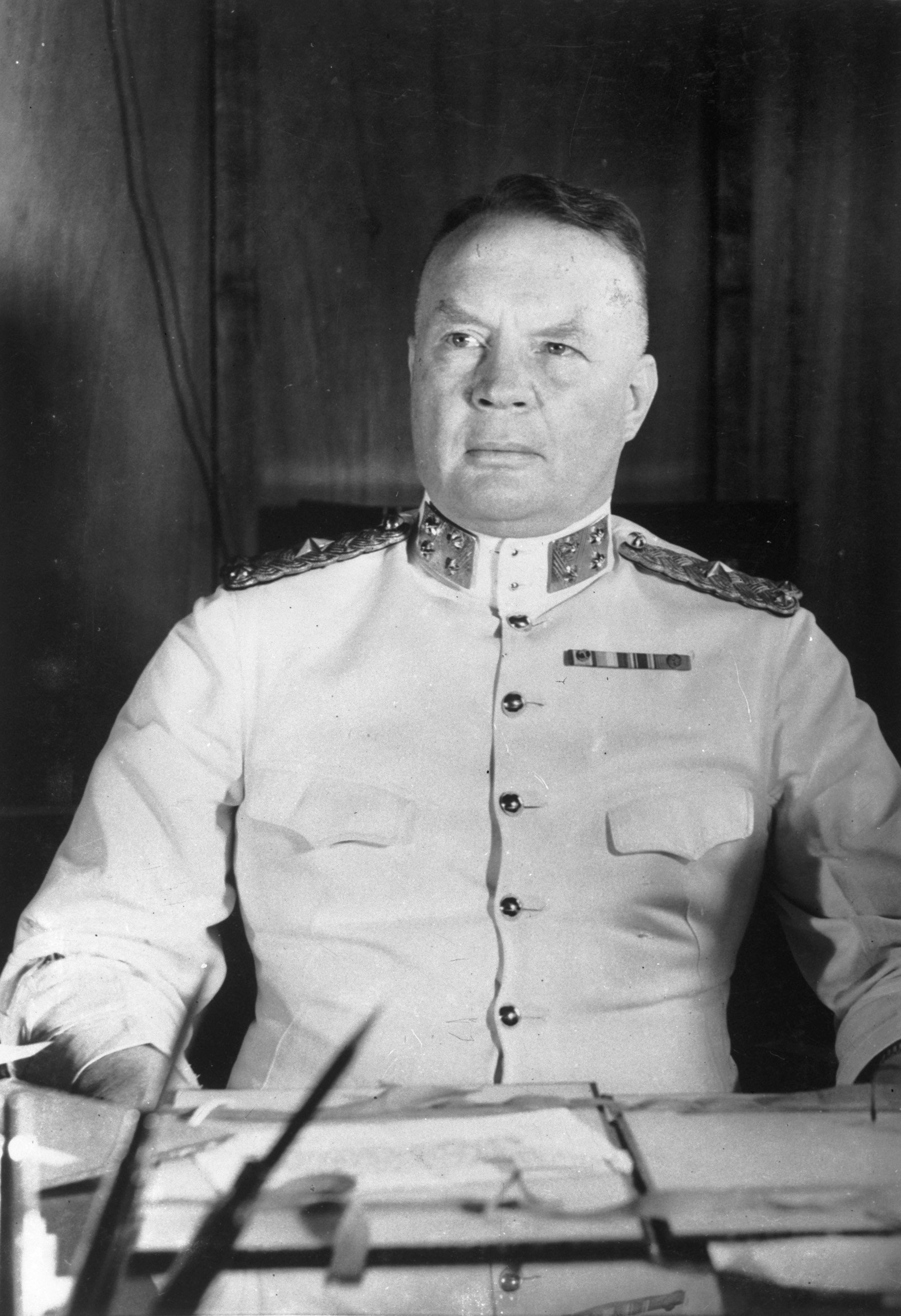
- Portrait c. 1941
- Born: 21 November 1887; Buitenzorg, Dutch East Indies
- Died: 15 January 1968 (aged 80); The Hague, Netherlands
- Spouse(s): Agneta C. Roqué (m. 1912–1925) Anna Maria Bergman (m. 1934)
- Military career
- Allegiance: Netherlands
- Branch: Royal Netherlands East Indies Army
- Service years: 1908–1945
- Rank: Lieutenant general
- Commands: American-British-Dutch-Australian Command
- Conflicts: World War II; Dutch East Indies campaign

Hein ter Poorten (21 November 1887 – 15 January 1968) was a Dutch military officer. He was the commander of the Royal Netherlands East Indies Army in World War II. Ter Poorten was also Allied land forces commander in the American-British-Dutch-Australian Command on Java during early 1942.

== Early life ==
Hein ter Poorten was born on 21 November 1887 in Buitenzorg (now Bogor) on Java, which was at the time part of the Dutch East Indies. He was the son of Franciscus Hendricus ter Poorten, a chief mate in the Government Navy, and of Clasina Ambrosina Kater.

After having been sworn in as an artillery officer in 1911, he helped to found the army air force, and in 1919 began a course at the Hogere Krijgsschool staff college in the Netherlands. He was invested as a Knight of the Order of Orange-Nassau with swords for his part in the development of military aviation in 1911.

== World War II ==
He steadily rose up the ranks upon his return to the East Indies, and by July 1939, was the Royal Netherlands Indies Army (KNIL) chief of the general staff. Lieutenant General Gerardus Johannes Berenschot's death in a flying accident in October 1941 saw Ter Poorten, by now also a lieutenant general, promoted to commander in chief of the KNIL.

Ter Poorten was regarded by his contemporaries in the army as a skilled commander with a firm understanding of military affairs in the East Indies, and thus was able to get on well with his subordinates and fellow officers; his relations with the civilian administration were less successful.

In January 1942, following the outbreak of war with Japan, Ter Poorten was appointed commander of land forces in the American-British-Dutch-Australian Command, a short-lived unified command of all Allied forces in South East Asia. By March, Ter Poorten became the de facto head of all Allied forces on Java, following rapid Japanese advances and the break-up of ABDACOM. It was left to him to unconditionally surrender the island to the Japanese on 8 March 1942. Ter Poorten had no authority to sign the surrender and did not initially do so. After threats and under pressure of reprisals, Ter Poorten was forced to read a statement on the radio about an unconditional capitulation. Van Mook had already been appointed Lieutenant Governor General on 1 January 1942 by the government in exile in London. In this position he was the deputy of Governor General Tjarda van Starkenborgh Stachouwer. on 8 March 1942, the Dutch East Indies government in exile was already in Brisbane. Australia gave Van Mook authority on those areas still unoccupied by the Japanese.

Ter Poorten spent the rest of the war in various prisoner of war camps.

== After the war ==
After his liberation in August 1945, Ter Poorten moved to the Netherlands. He requested his resignation as commander of the Royal Netherlands East Indies Army and head of the Department of War in November 1945. His request was not granted right away, but he was eventually honorably discharged on 28 February 1946. Despite these honors, Ter Poorten believed that he was being scapegoated for the defeat in the Dutch East Indies.

Ter Poorten died on 15 January 1968 in The Hague, at the age of 80.

== Military decorations ==
- Knight of the Order of the Netherlands Lion
- Officer of the Order of Orange-Nassau
- Medal for Long, Honest and Faithful Service
- Officer of the Legion of Honour
- Commander 1st Class of the Order of the Sword
