= John Loudon (politician) =

Dutch diplomat and politician (1866–1955)

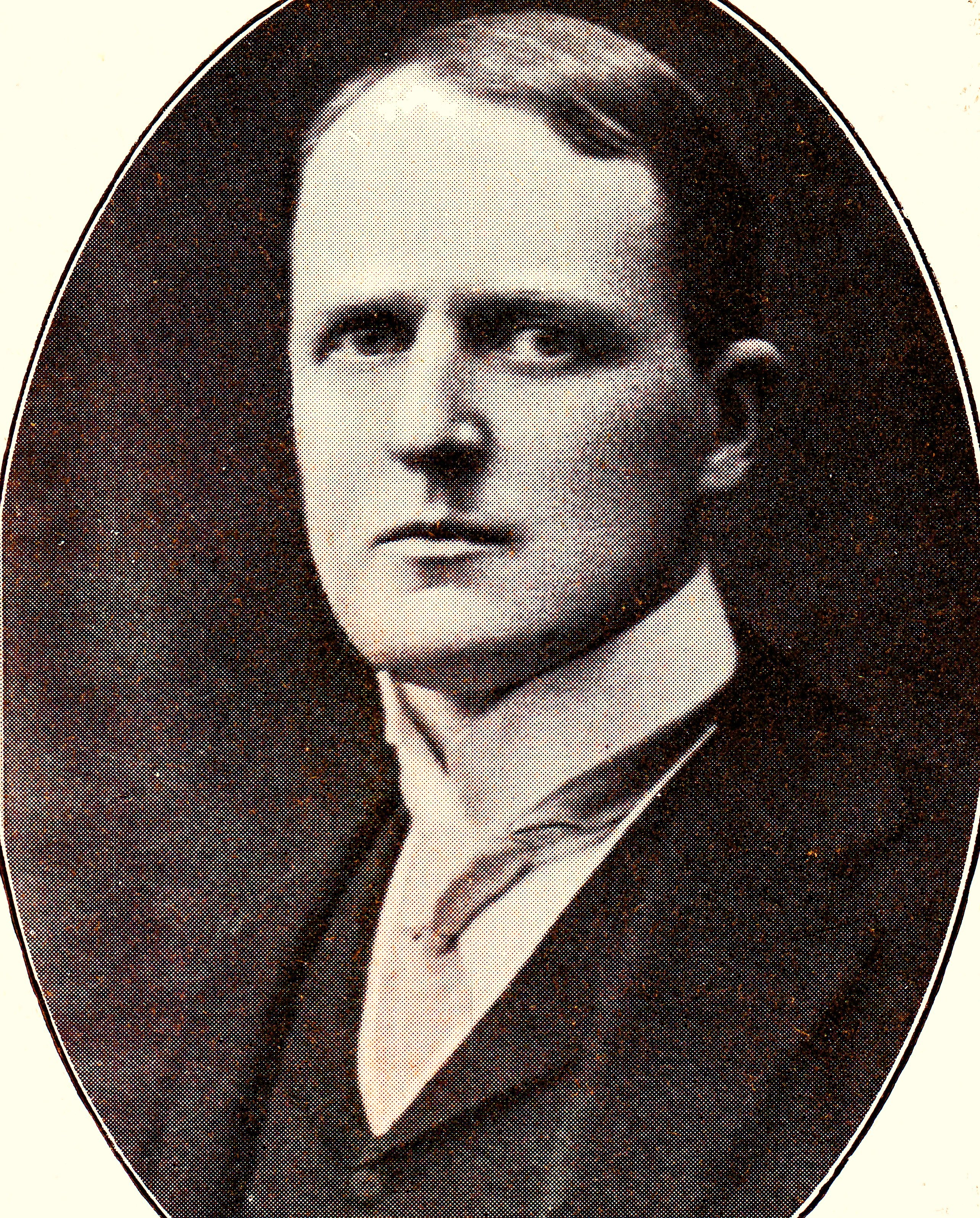
John Loudon

John Loudon (18 March 1866 – 11 November 1955) was a Dutch diplomat and minister of foreign affairs during the First World War. He was a moderate liberal.

== Biography ==
He was born on 18 March 1866 to James Loudon, the Governor-General of the Dutch East Indies from 1872 to 1875. Loudon Jr. obtained a doctorate in public international law at Leiden University in 1890. He served as a diplomat in China, Britain, France, Japan, and the United States.

From September 1913 to September 1918, he was minister of foreign affairs in the cabinet of Cort van der Linden. His careful policies, aimed to keep the Netherlands strictly neutral during the war—although personally he was pro-French—eventually led to conflict with the Queen Wilhelmina of the Netherlands.

He died on 11 November 1955.
