= Dutch East Indies Squadron =

- Active: 1899 –
- Country: Netherlands
- Branch: Royal Netherlands Navy
- Type: Naval squadron
- Role: Defend the Dutch East Indies
- Engagements: Battle of the Java Sea

The Dutch East Indies Squadron (Dutch: Nederlandsch Eskader in Oost-Indië, or shortened Nederlandsch Eskader) was a squadron of the Royal Netherlands Navy that was stationed in the Dutch East Indies. It was established in 1899 as Java division (Dutch: Java-divisie) before being renamed on 1 April 1905. The squadron operated in the waters of the Dutch East Indies and had as primary task to defend the colony against any potential enemy who might attempt to conquer it.

== History ==
During the 1890s the Auxiliary Squadron (Dutch: Auxiliair Eskader) of the Royal Netherlands Navy (RNLN) was deemed incapable of defending Java against a possible attack by an enemy that had the intend to conquer the Dutch East Indies. However, at the same time this possibility had to be taken in account after the balance of power in the Pacific had changed as a result of the Royal Navy withdrawing its naval forces to Europe. To deter a possible attack it was decided to create two divisions that would consist of warships drawn from both the Auxiliary Squadron and the Indies Military Navy (Dutch: Indische Militaire Marine). These two divisions were named Java Division (Dutch: Java-divisie) and Aceh Division (Dutch: Atjeh-divisie).

=== Java Division ===
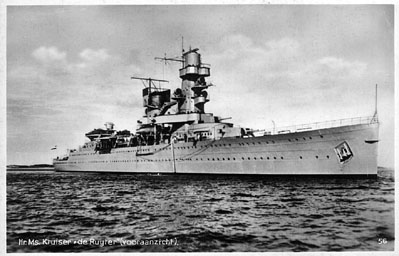
HNLMS De Ruyter

The Java Division was established in 1899 and was tasked with defending Java against any attack by potential enemies who might want to conquer the Dutch East Indies. It consisted of large, modern and fast Dutch warships that were stationed in the colony. The creation and naming of this division showed the importance of Java and also indicated where the defence of the Dutch East Indies would be concentrated in case of war. During its first years the Java Division performed numerous exercises. It also escorted Prins Hendrik der Nederlanden to Soerabaja after it experienced issues with its boilers while out at sea. At the time the Java Division consisted of Holland, Friesland, Piet Hein, Sumatra, Borneo and Cerberus.

During the Russo-Japanese War several Russian warships visited the harbour in Sabang while they sailed to the Far East. The RNLN responded by stationing the Java Division for eleven months at the harbour to uphold Dutch neutrality and sent at the same time more coastal defence ships and protected cruisers to the Dutch East Indies. This experience showed that the RNLN had to be capable to uphold its neutrality in the whole archipelago instead of concentrating on defending Java. As a result, the Java Division was renamed Dutch East Indies Squadron (Dutch: Nederlandsch Eskader in Oost-Indië) on 1 April 1905 to better reflect this purpose.

In 1906 several ships of the Dutch East Indies Squadron took part in the Dutch intervention in Bali.

Some ships joined later, including the De Ruyter in 1937 under the command of Admiral Karel Doorman.

=== Second World War ===
The Dutch East Indies Squadron was part of the naval component of ABDACOM during the Pacific War.

== Citations ==
=== Bibliography ===
- Bauduin, F. (1920). Het Nederlandsch Eskader in Oost-Indië 1914-1916 (in Dutch). The Hague: Martinus Nijhoff.
- de Boer, M.G. (1924). Zeehaven en Kolenstation Sabang, 1899-1924 (in Dutch). Amsterdam: L. van Leer & Co.
- Cohen Stuart, W.J. (1937). De Nederlandsche Zeemacht van 1889 tot 1915 (in Dutch). Vol. I: De Nederlandsche Zeemacht 1889-1903. The Hague: Algemeene Landsdrukkerij.
- Kooiman, J.; C.J., Snijders (1915). De Nederlandsche strijdmacht en hare mobilisatie in het jaar 1914 (in Dutch). Arnhem: Herman de Ruiter.
- Mollema, J.C. (1939). Geschiedenis van Nederland ter zee (in Dutch). Vol. I. Amsterdam: Uitgeversmaatschappij Joost van den Vondel.
- Mollema, J.C. (1942). Geschiedenis van Nederland ter zee (in Dutch). Vol. IV. Amsterdam: Uitgeversmaatschappij Joost van den Vondel.
- Raven, G.J.A., ed. (1988). De kroon op het anker: 175 jaar Koninklijke Marine (in Dutch). Amsterdam: De Bataafsche Leeuw. ISBN 90-6707-200-1.
- Rinkes, A.; van Zalinge, N.; de Roever, J.W., eds. (1925). Het Indische boek der zee (in Dutch). Weltevreden: Drukkerij Volkslectuur.
