= Pieter Cort van der Linden =

Dutch politician (1846–1935)

His Excellency Pieter Cort van der Linden
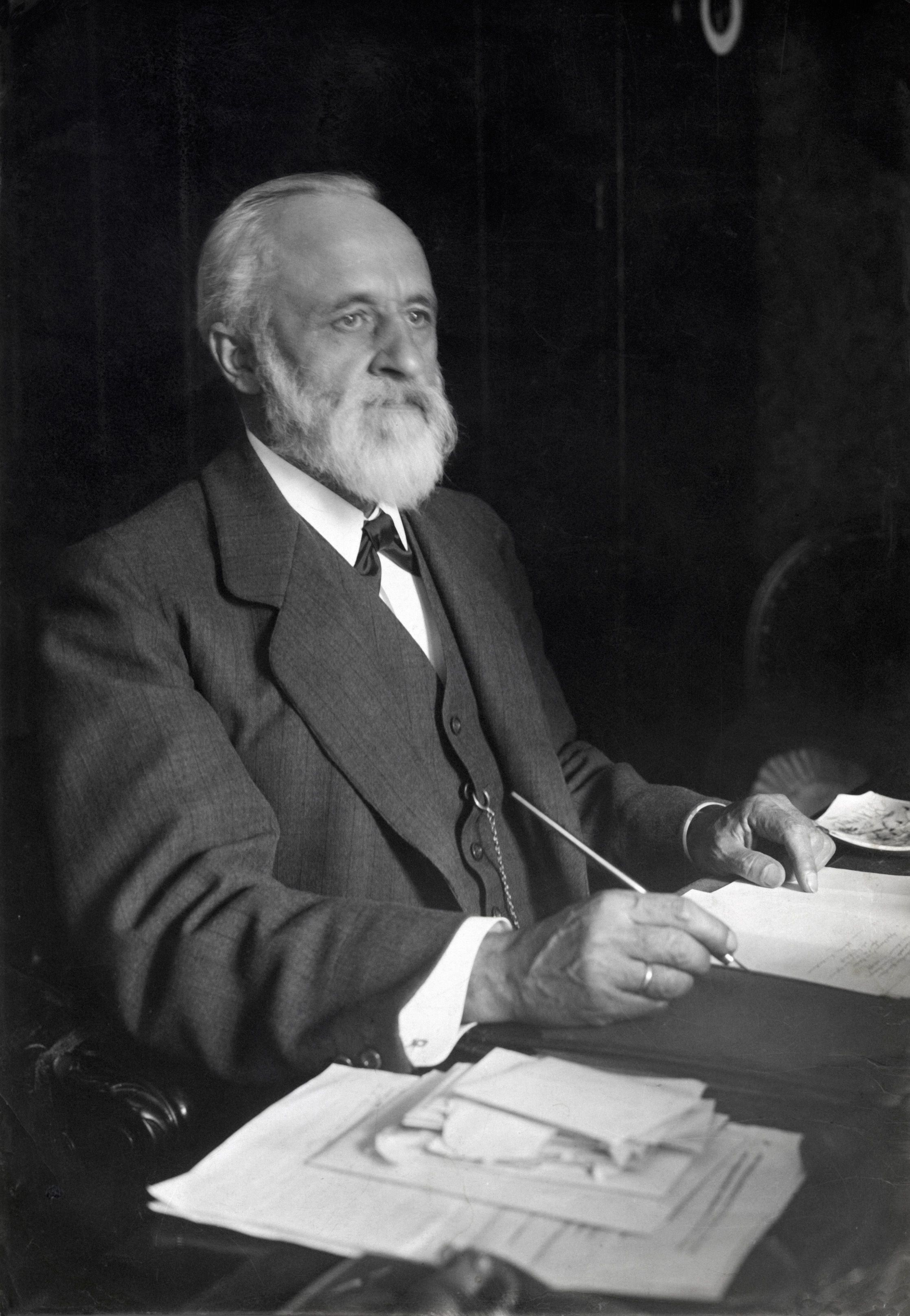
- Pieter Cort van der Linden in 1916

Prime Minister of the Netherlands
- In office 29 August 1913 – 9 September 1918
- Monarch: Wilhelmina
- Preceded by: Theo Heemskerk
- Succeeded by: Charles Ruijs de Beerenbrouck

Minister of the Interior
- In office 29 August 1913 – 9 September 1918
- Prime Minister: Pieter Cort van der Linden
- Preceded by: Theo Heemskerk
- Succeeded by: Charles Ruijs de Beerenbrouck

Minister of Foreign Affairs
- In office 29 August 1913 – 27 September 1913; Ad interim
- Prime Minister: Pieter Cort van der Linden
- Preceded by: René de Marees van Swinderen
- Succeeded by: John Loudon

Member of the Council of State
- In office 8 October 1918 – 1 January 1935
- In office 4 November 1902 – 29 August 1913
- Vice President: See list: Johan Schorer (1902–1903) Petrus van Swinderen (1903–1911) Joan Röell (1912–1913) Wilhelmus van Leeuwen (1918–1928) Alex van Lynden van Sandenburg (1928–1932) Frans Beelaerts van Blokland (1933–1935)

Minister of Justice
- In office 27 July 1897 – 1 August 1901
- Prime Minister: Nicolaas Pierson
- Preceded by: Willem van der Kaay
- Succeeded by: Jan Loeff

Personal details
- Born: Pieter Wilhelm Adrianus Cort van der Linden; 14 May 1846 The Hague, Netherlands
- Died: 15 July 1935 (aged 89) The Hague, Netherlands
- Party: Independent Liberal
- Spouses: Joanna Wittewaall (m. 1873; died 1874) Johanna de Koning (m. 1880)
- Children: 4 sons
- Education: Leiden University (Bachelor of Laws, Master of Laws, Doctor of Philosophy)

Pieter Wilhelm Adrianus Cort van der Linden (14 May 1846 – 15 July 1935) was a Dutch politician who served as Prime Minister of the Netherlands from August 1913 to September 1918.

== Biography ==
He was the last prime minister to lead a liberal cabinet and the last liberal to be Prime Minister until Mark Rutte in 2010 (92 years later). One of Cort van der Linden's major achievements was maintaining Dutch neutrality during World War I although personally, he was pro-German.

He also introduced universal suffrage in the Netherlands in what is now known as the Pacification of 1917. That made the Social Democratic Workers' Party and the General League of Roman Catholic Caucuses win the 1918 elections. The Catholic Charles Ruijs de Beerenbrouck took Cort van der Linden's place as Prime Minister.

Van der Linden is remembered for passing the 1874 act of parliament prohibiting child labour in heavy industry.

== Decorations ==
Honours
Ribbon bar	Honour	Country	Date	Comment
	Knight Grand Cross of the Order of Orange-Nassau	Netherlands	1 August 1901	
	Knight Grand Cross of the Order of the Netherlands Lion	Netherlands	28 January 1915	

Honorific Titles
Ribbon bar	Honour	Country	Date	Comment
	Minister of State	Netherlands	28 January 1915	Style of Excellency

Political offices
Preceded by Willem van der Kaay	Minister of Justice; 1897–1901	Succeeded by Jan Loeff
Preceded by René de Marees van Swinderen	Minister of Foreign Affairs; Ad interim 1913	Succeeded by John Loudon
Preceded by Theo Heemskerk	Minister of the Interior; 1913–1918	Succeeded by Charles Ruijs de Beerenbrouck
Preceded by Theo Heemskerk	Prime Minister of the Netherlands; 1913–1918	Succeeded by Charles Ruijs de Beerenbrouck
