= Arthur Blackburn =

Australian lawyer and recipient of the Victoria Cross

Brigadier Arthur Blackburn VC, CMG, CBE, ED, JP
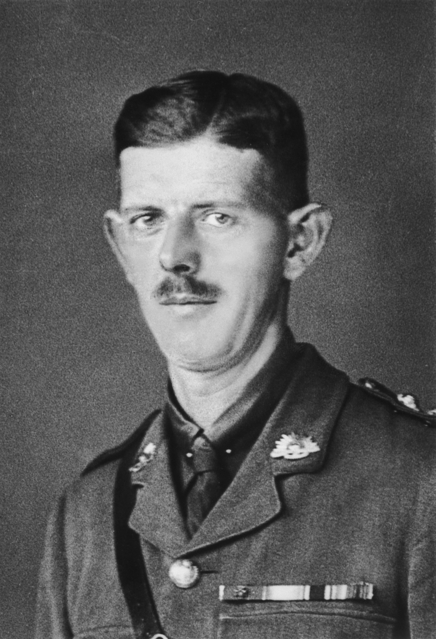
- Captain A. S. Blackburn c. 1919
- Born: 25 November 1892; Woodville, Colony of South Australia
- Died: 24 November 1960 (aged 67); Crafers, South Australia
- Burial place: West Terrace Cemetery, Adelaide
- Relatives: Sir Richard Blackburn (son); Rosemary Wighton (daughter); Sir Charles Blackburn (half-brother); Thomas Blackburn (father)
- Military career
- Allegiance: Australia
- Branch: Australian Army
- Service years: 1911–1917; 1924–1946
- Rank: Brigadier
- Units: 10th Battalion (1914–1916)
- Commands: 18th Light Horse (Machine Gun) Regiment (1939–1940); 2/3rd Machine Gun Battalion (1940–1942); Blackforce (1942)
- Conflicts: World War I; Gallipoli Campaign; Landing at Anzac Cove; Western Front; Battle of the Somme; Battle of Pozières; Battle of Mouquet Farm; World War II; Syria–Lebanon Campaign; Dutch East Indies campaign
- Awards: Victoria Cross; Companion of the Order of St Michael and St George; Commander of the Order of the British Empire
- Other work: Member for Sturt (1918–1921); Coroner of the City of Adelaide (1933–1947); Commissioner of the Commonwealth Court of Conciliation and Arbitration (1947–1955)

Brigadier Arthur Seaforth Blackburn, VC, CMG, CBE, ED, JP (25 November 1892 – 24 November 1960) was an Australian soldier, lawyer, politician, and recipient of the Victoria Cross (VC), the highest award for valour in battle that could be awarded to a member of the Australian armed forces at the time. A lawyer and part-time soldier prior to the outbreak of World War I, Blackburn enlisted in the Australian Imperial Force in August 1914, and was assigned to the 10th Battalion. His unit landed at Anzac Cove, Gallipoli, on April 25, 1915, and he and another scout were credited with advancing the furthest inland on the day of the landing. Blackburn was later commissioned and, along with his battalion, spent the rest of the Gallipoli campaign fighting Ottoman forces.

The 10th Battalion was withdrawn from Gallipoli in November 1915, and after re-organising and training in Egypt, sailed for the Western Front in late March 1916. It saw its first real fighting in France on 23 July during the Battle of Pozières, part of the Battle of the Somme. It was during this battle that Blackburn's actions resulted in a recommendation for his award of the VC. Commanding 50 men, he led four separate sorties to drive the Germans from a strong point using hand grenades, capturing 370 yards (340 m) of trench. He was the first member of his battalion to be awarded the VC during World War I, and the first South Australian to receive the VC. He also fought in the Battle of Mouquet Farm in August, before being evacuated to the United Kingdom and then Australia suffering from illness. He was medically discharged in early 1917.

Blackburn returned to legal practice and pursued a military career during the interwar period, and served as a member of the South Australian parliament in 1918–1921. He led the Returned Sailors' and Soldiers' Imperial League of Australia in South Australia for several years, and was appointed the coroner for the city of Adelaide, South Australia. After the outbreak of World War II, Blackburn was appointed to command the 2/3rd Machine Gun Battalion of the Second Australian Imperial Force, and led it during the Syria–Lebanon Campaign against the Vichy French in 1941, during which he personally accepted the surrender of Damascus. In early 1942, his battalion was withdrawn from the Middle East and played a role in the defence of Java in the Dutch East Indies from the Japanese. Captured, Blackburn spent the rest of the war as a prisoner-of-war. After he was liberated in 1945, he returned to Australia and was made a Commander of the Order of the British Empire (CBE) for his services on Java in 1942.

Following the war, Blackburn was appointed as a conciliation commissioner of the Commonwealth Court of Conciliation and Arbitration until 1955 and in that year was made a Companion of the Order of St Michael and St George (CMG) for his services to the community. He died in 1960 and was buried with full military honours in the Australian Imperial Force section of the West Terrace Cemetery, Adelaide. His Victoria Cross and other medals are displayed in the Hall of Valour at the Australian War Memorial.

== Early life ==
Arthur Seaforth Blackburn was born on 25 November 1892 at Woodville, Colony of South Australia. He was the youngest child of Thomas Blackburn, an Anglican canon and entomologist, and his second wife, Margaret Harriette Stewart, née Browne. Arthur was initially educated at Pulteney Grammar School. His mother died in 1904 at the age of 40. He studied at St Peter's College, Adelaide from 1906-1909 followed by studies at the University of Adelaide, where he completed a Bachelor of Laws in 1913, after being articled to C. B. Hardy. During Blackburn's term as his articled clerk, on one occasion Hardy was assaulted by two men on the street, and despite his slight build, Blackburn intervened and chased them away. In 1911, compulsory military training had been introduced, and Arthur had joined the South Australian Scottish Regiment of the Citizen Military Forces (CMF). He was called to the bar on 13 December 1913. His half-brother, Charles Blackburn, became a prominent Sydney doctor, served in the Australian Army Medical Corps in World War I, and later became a long-serving Chancellor of the University of Sydney. Their father died in 1912. At the outbreak of World War I, Arthur was practising as a solicitor in Adelaide with the firm of Nesbit and Nesbit, and was still serving in the CMF.

== World War I ==
=== Gallipoli ===
On 19 August 1914, aged 21, Blackburn enlisted as a private in the Australian Imperial Force (AIF) and was assigned to the 10th Battalion, 3rd Brigade, 1st Division. The 10th Battalion underwent initial training at Morphettville in Adelaide, South Australia, before embarking on SS Ascanius at nearby Outer Harbor on 20 October. Sailing via Fremantle and Colombo in Ceylon, the ship arrived at Alexandria, Egypt, on 6 December. The troops went into camp near Cairo. They trained there until 28 February 1915, when they moved to Alexandria. They embarked on SS Ionian on 1 March and a few days later arrived at the port of Mudros on the Greek island of Lemnos in the northeastern Aegean Sea, where they remained aboard for the next seven weeks.

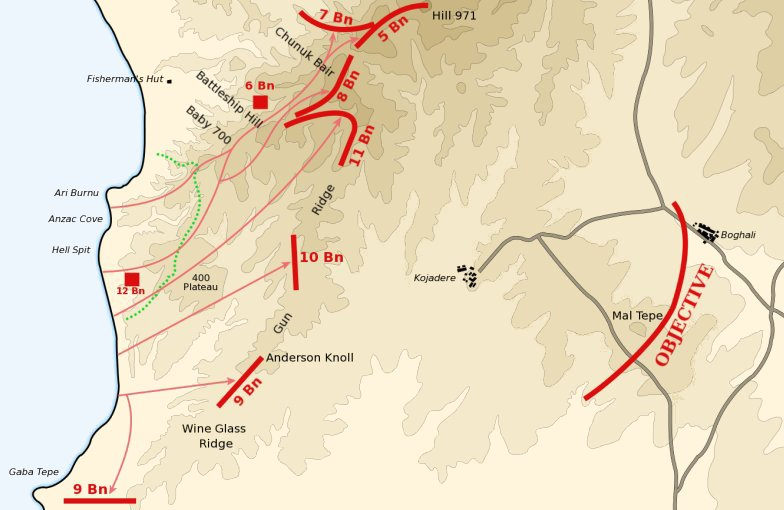
The first day objective of the 10th Battalion on "Gun Ridge" for the landing at Anzac Cove. The green dotted line shows the actual extent of the lodgement at the end of the first day.

The 3rd Brigade was chosen as the covering force for the landing at Anzac Cove, Gallipoli, on 25 April, which marked the commencement of the Gallipoli campaign. The brigade embarked on the battleship HMS Prince of Wales and the destroyer HMS Foxhound, and after transferring to strings of rowing-boats initially towed by steam pinnaces, the battalion began rowing ashore at about 04:30. Blackburn was one of the battalion scouts, and among the first ashore.

Australia's World War I official war historian, Charles Bean, noted there was strong evidence that Blackburn, along with Lance Corporal Philip Robin, probably made it further inland on the day of the landing than any other Australian soldiers whose movements are known, some 1,800–2,000 yards (1,600–1,800 m). The 3rd Brigade covering force fell well short of its ultimate objective, the crest of a feature later known as "Scrubby Knoll", part of "Third (or Gun) Ridge", but Blackburn and Robin, who were sent ahead as scouts, got beyond it. Robin was killed in action three days after the landing. Later in life, Blackburn was modest and retiring about his and Robin's achievement, stating that it was "an absolute mystery" how they had survived, given the range at which they were being shot at and the men who were shot around them.

Blackburn participated in heavy fighting at the landing; by 30 April, the 10th Battalion had suffered 466 killed and wounded. He was soon promoted to lance corporal, and was placed in charge of the unit post office for one month shortly after his promotion. He was involved in subsequent trench warfare defending the beachhead, including the Turkish counter-attack of 19 May. He was commissioned as a second lieutenant on 4 August, and appointed as a platoon commander in A Company. Blackburn served at the front for the rest of the campaign, until the 10th Battalion was withdrawn to Lemnos in November, and subsequently back to Egypt. The battalion suffered over 700 casualties during the campaign, including 207 dead. The unit underwent re-organisation in Egypt, and on 20 February 1916, Blackburn was promoted to lieutenant. In early March, he was hospitalised for two weeks with neurasthenia. The battalion sailed for France in late March, arriving in early April. By this time, Blackburn was posted to a platoon in D Company.

=== Western Front ===
Blackburn went on leave in France from 29 April to 7 May. The 10th Battalion entered the fighting on the Western Front in June, initially in the quiet Armentières sector of the front line. While in this area, Blackburn was selected as a member of a special raiding party led by Captain Bill McCann. In the early hours of 23 July, the 10th Battalion was committed to its first significant action on the Western Front during the Battle of Pozières, part of the Battle of the Somme. Initially, A Company under McCann were sent forward to assist the 9th Battalion, which was involved in a bomb (hand grenade) fight over the O. G. 1 trench system. (Note: The O. G. (Old German) trench system consisted of two lines of German trenches that were objectives of the Australian assault.) Held up by heavy machine gun fire and bombs, McCann, who had been wounded in the head, reported to the commanding officer (CO) of the 9th Battalion, Lieutenant Colonel James Robertson, that more help was needed. About 05:30, a detachment of 50 men based on 16 Platoon, D Company, 10th Battalion, was then sent forward under Blackburn to drive the Germans out of a section of trench. Blackburn, finding that A Company had suffered heavy casualties, immediately led his men in rushing a barricade across the trench. Breaking it down, and using bombs, they pushed the Germans back. Beyond this point, preceding artillery bombardments had almost obliterated the trench, and forward movement was exposed to heavy machine gun fire.

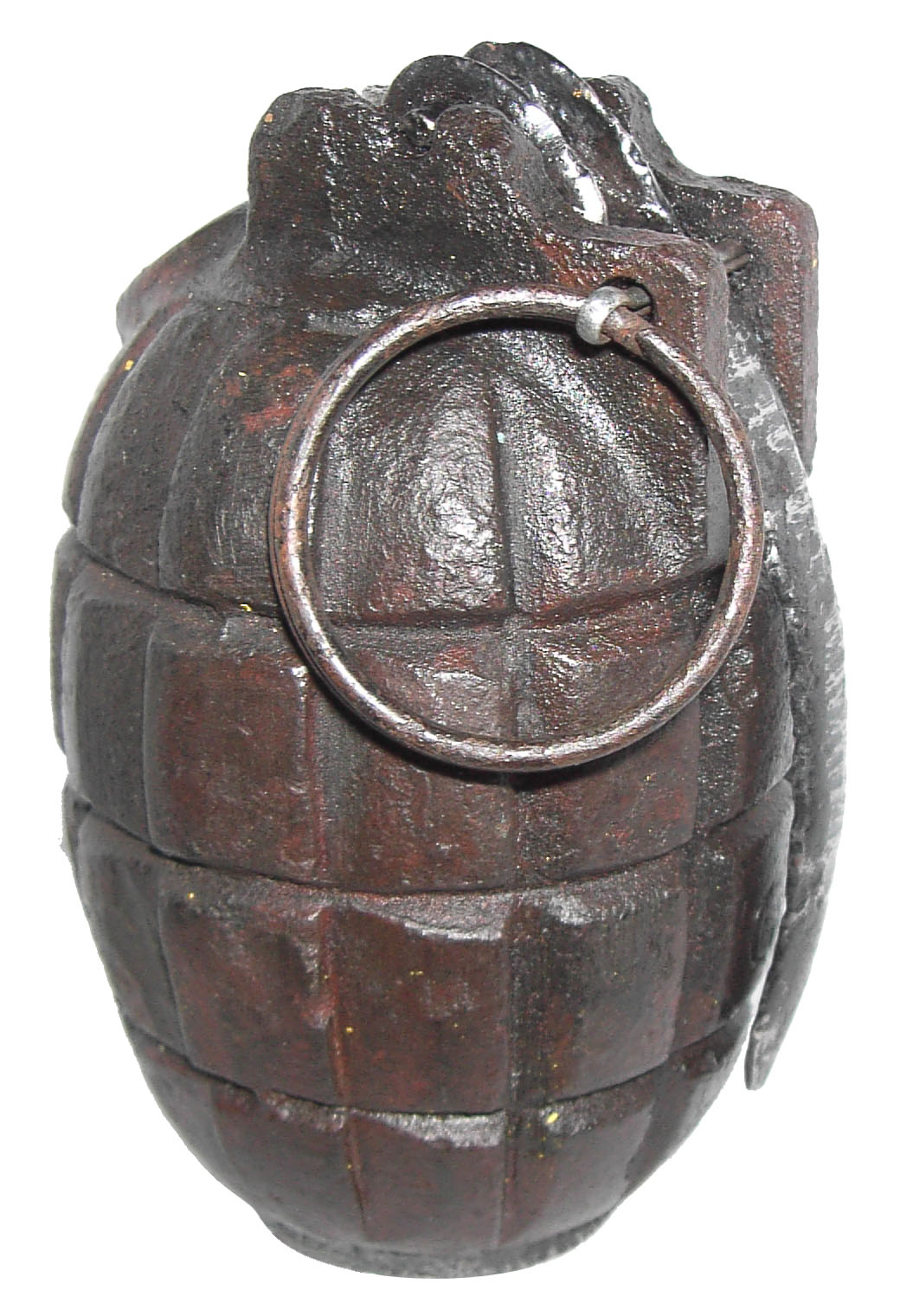
A No.5 Mk I Mills bomb of the type used liberally during the Pozières fighting

Blackburn, along with a group of four men, crawled forward to establish the source of the German machine gun fire, but all four of the men were killed, so he returned to his detachment. He went back to Robertson, who arranged support from trench mortars. Under the cover of this fire, Blackburn again went forward with some of his men, but another four were killed by machine gun fire. Another report to Robertson resulted in artillery support, and Blackburn was able to push forward another 30 yards (27 m) before being held up again, this time by German bombers. Under cover from friendly bombers, Blackburn and a sergeant crawled forward to reconnoitre, establishing that the Germans were holding a trench that ran at right angles to the one they were in. Blackburn then led his troops in the clearing of this trench, which was about 120 yards (110 m) long. During this fighting, four more men were killed, including the sergeant, but Blackburn and the remaining men were able to secure the trench and consolidate. Having captured the trench, Blackburn made another attempt to capture the strong point that was the source of the machine gun fire, but lost another five men. He, therefore, decided to hold the trench, which he did until 14:00, when he was relieved. By this time, forty of the seventy men that had been under his command during the day had been killed or wounded. Sometime that night, Blackburn took over command of D Company, but was relieved the following morning.

For his actions, Blackburn was recommended for the award of the Victoria Cross (VC), the highest award for gallantry in battle that could be awarded to a member of the Australian armed forces at the time. Describing his actions in a letter to a friend, the normally retiring Blackburn said it was, "the biggest bastard of a job I have ever struck". In recommending him for the VC, his commanding officer, Lieutenant Colonel Stanley Price Weir, observed, "Matters looked anything but cheerful for Lieutenant Blackburn and his men, but Blackburn lost neither his heart nor his head".

The 10th Battalion was relieved from its positions at Pozières in the late evening of 25 July, having suffered 327 casualties in three days. Blackburn was temporarily promoted to the rank of captain on 1 August, due to the heavy losses. The battalion spent the next three weeks in rest areas, but returned to the fighting during the Battle of Mouquet Farm on 19–23 August, incurring another 335 casualties from the 620 that were committed to the fighting. Following this battle, the 10th Battalion went into rest camp in Belgium, and on 8 September, Blackburn reported sick with pleurisy and was evacuated to the 3rd London General Hospital. He relinquished his temporary rank upon evacuation, and was placed on the seconded list. Blackburn's VC citation was published on 9 September, and read:

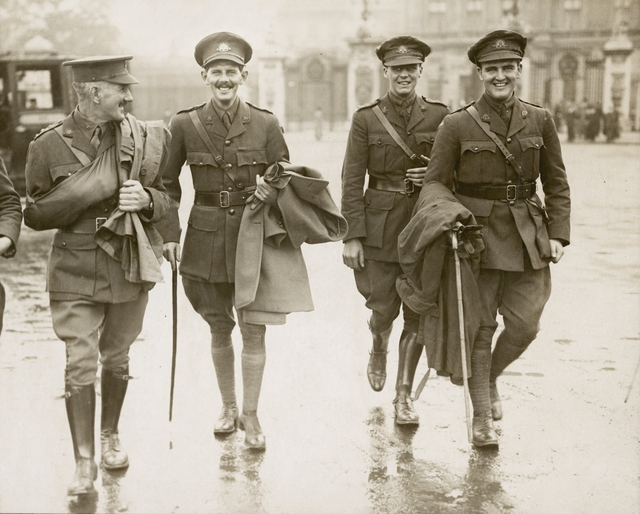
Blackburn (second from left) and McCann (right) after receiving their awards at Buckingham Palace

For most conspicuous bravery. He was directed with fifty men to drive the enemy from a strong point. By dogged determination he eventually captured their trench after personally leading four separate parties of bombers against it, many of whom became casualties. In the face of fierce opposition he captured 250 yards of trench. Then, after crawling forward with a Serjeant to reconnoitre, he returned, attacked and seized another 120 yards of trench, establishing communication with the battalion on his left.

— The London Gazette, 8 September 1916

Blackburn was the first member of the 10th Battalion and first South Australian to be awarded the VC, and his VC was earned in the costliest battle in Australian history. He was discharged from hospital on 30 September, and attended an investiture at Buckingham Palace on 4 October to receive his VC from King George V. The same day, McCann received the Military Cross for his own actions at Pozières that immediately preceded those of Blackburn. Blackburn embarked at Southampton for Australia aboard the hospital ship Karoola on 16 October for six months' rest, arriving home via Melbourne on 3 December. The train he arrived on was met by the state premier, Crawford Vaughan, but he declined to speak to the assembled crowd about his exploits. The following day he was fêted by the staff and students of St Peter's College.

He married Rose Ada Kelly at the St Peter's College chapel on 22 March 1917; (Note: Lock gives their date of marriage as 16 March 1917, but this is contradicted by R. A. Blackburn, Faulkner and South Australian Births, Deaths and Marriages data, which state they were married on 22 March.) they had two sons and two daughters. Their sons were Richard and Robert; Richard also became a lawyer and eventually became an eminent jurist, chief justice of the Supreme Court of the Australian Capital Territory and chancellor of the Australian National University. His daughter Margaret married Jim Forbes, who became a long-serving federal government minister, and his other daughter Rosemary became a literary editor, author, and adviser to the South Australian government on women's affairs. Blackburn was discharged from the AIF on medical grounds on 10 April 1917, as he was classified as too ill to return to the fighting. He was awarded an invalid soldier's pension. In addition to his VC, Blackburn also received the 1914–15 Star, British War Medal and Victory Medal for his service in World War I. His brothers Harry and John also served in the AIF during the war.

== Between the wars ==
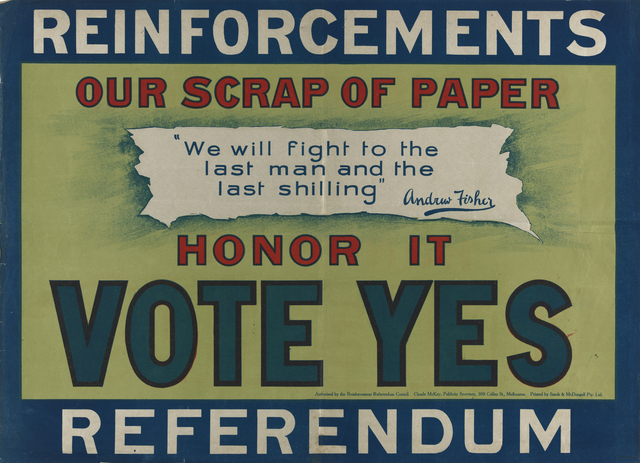
Blackburn advocated for the "Yes" case in the 1917 conscription referendum

Blackburn returned to legal practice in early 1917, becoming a principal lawyer for the firm of Fenn and Hardy. In May 1917, Blackburn was elected as one of five vice-presidents of the Returned Soldiers' Association (RSA) in South Australia, which was led by the first commanding officer of the 10th Battalion, Weir. On 12 September, Blackburn was elected state president of the RSA. He was involved in the 1917 Australian conscription referendum campaign, advocating in favour of conscription. As RSA president, he was involved in advocating for returned soldiers, and navigated a contentious period in the organisation's history. He also led the fundraising for a soldiers' memorial to be built in Adelaide. In January 1918, he was re-elected unopposed as president.

Despite his push for the RSA to remain independent of politics, in early April 1918, Blackburn successfully contested the three-member South Australian House of Assembly seat of Sturt as a National Party candidate, and on 6 April he was elected first of the three with 19.2 per cent of the vote. As a parliamentarian, Blackburn's speeches were generally about issues affecting those still serving overseas, as well as returned soldiers. A notable exception was his successful motion in favour of a profit-sharing system for industrial employees. He advocated several radical ideas in his time as a parliamentarian, including removing all single men from the state public service so they would be free to enlist. He was also criticised in Parliament for not paying due attention to important legislation regarding ex-soldiers. This criticism even extended to attacks from another AIF man, Bill Denny, from the opposition Australian Labor Party (ALP). According to his biographer Andrew Faulkner, his time in Parliament showed Blackburn to be a man of few words, but his words were chosen well and delivered with authority.

On 29 August 1918, he was appointed a justice of the peace, and in November, he became a Freemason with the St Peter's Collegiate Lodge. In July 1919, the Returned Sailors' and Soldiers' Imperial League of Australia (RSSILA), which had succeeded the RSA, held its annual congress in Adelaide. Among the motions that Blackburn moved was one calling on the federal government to ensure that a suitable headstone was erected over the grave of every sailor and soldier killed during the war. He also railed against delays in the deferred pay of dead soldiers being paid to their widows.

In January 1920, Blackburn was re-elected as state president of the RSSILA, although this was the first time he was opposed for the post, and he only won narrowly. By this time he had built the state branch of the organisation to 17,000 members. During that year, he hosted visits by two notables; Field Marshal William Birdwood, and the Prince of Wales, who later became King Edward VIII. In accordance with normal procedures, while serving in the AIF, Blackburn had been appointed an honorary lieutenant in the CMF on 20 February 1916 on the Reserve of Officers List. (Note: The Reserve of Officers List was part of the reserve element of the CMF.) This appointment was made substantive on 1 October 1920, still on the Reserve of Officers List. Continuing to practise law while a member of Parliament made for a heavy workload, and Blackburn did not seek re-election in 1921. In the same year he relinquished his role as state president of RSSILA, but he continued to be a fierce advocate for returned soldiers.

On 30 October 1925, Blackburn was transferred as a lieutenant from the Reserve of Officers List to the part-time 43rd Battalion of the CMF. In the same year, along with McCann, he formed the legal firm Blackburn and McCann, continuing the association they had during the fighting at Pozières. On 21 February 1927, Blackburn was promoted to captain, still serving with the 43rd Battalion. In early 1928, Blackburn became a foundation member of the Legacy Club of Adelaide, established to assist the dependents of deceased ex-servicemen; he later became its second president. In this role, he created a Junior Legacy Club for teenage sons of men who had died, which conducted activities such as camps and sports.

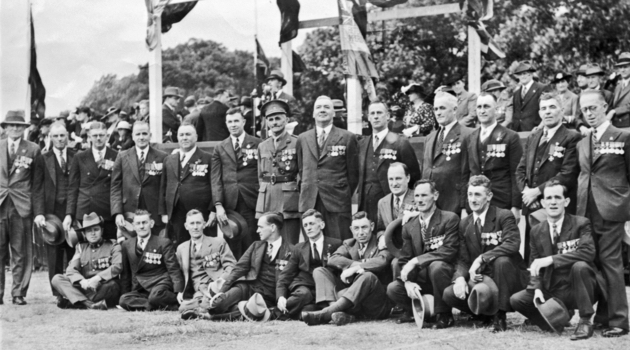
A group of Australian VC recipients assembled in Sydney on Anzac Day 1938. Blackburn is standing, third from left.

Blackburn was transferred from the 43rd Battalion to the 23rd Light Horse Regiment on 1 July 1928. In September and October 1928, Blackburn helped raise a volunteer force which was used to protect non-union labour in an industrial dispute on the wharves at Port Adelaide and Outer Harbor. Initially called the "Essential Services Maintenance Volunteers" (ESMV) then the "Citizen's Defence Brigade", the men of this organisation, armed with government-issued rifles and bayonets, were deployed by the South Australia Police to intervene in the dispute between union and non-union labour on the docks. There was no fighting between the force and the strikers, and the dispute was resolved by early October.

Following the amalgamation of light horse regiments, Blackburn was transferred to the 18th/23rd Light Horse Regiment on 1 July 1930, and to the 18th Light Horse (Machine Gun) Regiment on 1 October of the same year. In 1933, Blackburn became the coroner of the city of Adelaide, a position he held for fourteen years, with leave of absence during his World War II service. In this role, he was criticised for refusing to offer public explanations for his decisions not to hold inquests; it was criticism he ignored. The ALP attacked Blackburn's decision-making as coroner, according to Faulkner, this was probably influenced by his involvement with the ESMV in 1928 and his alignment with conservative politics. They were joined by the editor of The News, who ran several editorials criticising Blackburn. In his role, Blackburn often dealt with deaths of returned soldiers, and murders committed by them. On 6 May 1935, Blackburn was awarded the King George V Silver Jubilee Medal. He was promoted to major on 15 January 1937, still with the same regiment, and in the same year was awarded the King George VI Coronation Medal. On 1 July 1939, a few months before the outbreak of World War II, he was promoted to lieutenant colonel and appointed to command the 18th Light Horse (Machine Gun) Regiment.

== World War II ==
Blackburn stopped practising law in 1940, and on 20 June was appointed to raise and command the 2/3rd Machine Gun Battalion, part of the Second Australian Imperial Force raised for service overseas during World War II. He was one of only three Australian World War I VC recipients to volunteer for overseas service in World War II. Eleven of the officers selected by Blackburn for his new unit were former officers of the 18th Light Horse (Machine Gun) Regiment, including the battalion second-in-command, Major Sid Reed, who was to prove valuable in moderating Blackburn's temper at times. The unit was raised in four different states; headquarters and A Company in South Australia, B Company in Victoria, C Company in Tasmania and D Company in Western Australia. It concentrated in Adelaide on 31 October, after which Blackburn moulded the separately raised companies into one organisation. Multi-day route marches featured strongly in their training; Blackburn invariably marched at the front of his battalion. After undergoing training, the battalion entrained for Sydney where it embarked on SS Ile de France on 10 April 1941. The battalion sailed for the Middle East via Colombo, where they had ten days' leave, and disembarked in Egypt on 14 May. Upon arrival, the battalion was assigned to the 7th Division in Palestine, where it underwent further training at a camp just north of Gaza.

=== Syria–Lebanon campaign ===
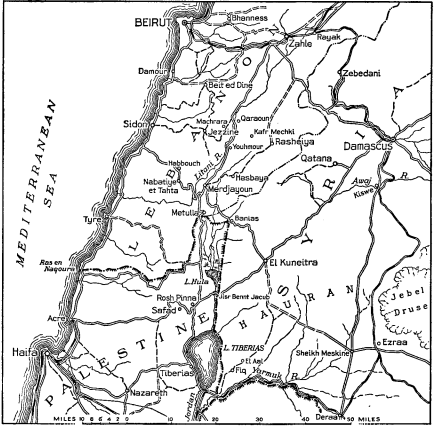
The French Mandate for Syria and the Lebanon was governed by Vichy forces.

In mid-June, the battalion was committed to the Syria–Lebanon campaign against the Vichy French in the French Mandate for Syria and the Lebanon. Due to the involvement of Vichy French and Free French troops on opposite sides, the campaign was politically sensitive and as a result of heavy censorship not widely reported in Australia at the time; the nature of the fighting, where it was reported, was also played down as the Vichy forces outnumbered the Allies and were also better equipped. The Allied plan involved four axes of attack, with the 7th Division committed mainly to the coastal drive on Beirut in Lebanon and the central thrusts towards Damascus in Syria. Blackburn initially divided his time between divisional headquarters in Palestine and the front, while three companies of the 2/3rd, along with a battery of anti-tank guns, were the only divisional reserve.

The 2/3rd were fully committed on 15 June, when the commander of I Corps, the Australian Major General John Lavarack, committed the divisional reserve to secure a bridge across the Jordan River and thwart a major Vichy French counter-stroke that threatened to derail the campaign. This involved a blacked-out night-time drive of 28 miles (45 km) at relatively high speed over rough and treacherous roads to the bridge; Blackburn drove in advance of his force. On arrival, he was ordered to detach one of his companies north to block the road from Metulla. Blackburn then led A Company on another 19-mile (30 km) drive before returning to check on the dispositions of his remaining troops at the bridge, near which he established his headquarters. Also on the 15th, D Company was detached from the battalion to support the coastal advance, and remained so throughout the campaign.

During the day a British staff officer arrived and directed Blackburn to send a company, two anti-tank guns and two armoured cars loaded with ammunition to Quneitra, which Blackburn understood to have surrendered to the Vichy French. Blackburn baulked at this further splitting of his force, but when the order was confirmed by higher headquarters, early on 16 June he sent the scratch force of around 200 men north. The force took up positions on a ridge overlooking the town, but soon gathered intelligence that 1,500 Vichy French were holding the town, supported by numerous tanks and armoured cars. Blackburn, very concerned about his vanguard, decided to go forward to the ridge himself to check on dispositions. In the meantime, the company commander in that location tried to coax the Vichy French tanks to within range of his anti-tank guns, to no avail. Prior to Blackburn's arrival, a British battery of Ordnance QF 25-pounder field guns arrived. In a further effort to draw out the Vichy French, Blackburn personally drove his staff car forward and round in circles in an exposed position, but again the Vichy French did not take the bait. Late in the day, a battalion of British infantry arrived and, under covering fire from the machine gunners, attacked and captured the town; the 25-pounders knocked out three Vichy French armoured cars. Blackburn's advance force had made a significant contribution to stopping the Vichy French counter-stroke.

Blackburn's area of responsibility was briefly expanded to include all the routes east of the Jordan as far as Quneitra. To cover this he was allocated squadrons of light tanks and Bren carriers, as well as a British dressing station to handle casualties. On 19 June his force was ordered forward towards Damascus. This involved a 25-mile (40 km) drive to Sheikh Meskine then a 50-mile (80 km) journey north, which took nearly two days due to the state of the roads. Meanwhile, Blackburn was recalled to Rosh Pinna in Palestine to receive orders from the commander of the Damascus front, Major General John Fullerton Evetts of the British 6th Infantry Division, who directed him to assist the "weary and disheartened" Free French forward to Damascus. To achieve this task, his force was trimmed to a reinforced company of the 2/3rd and five anti-tank guns, totalling around 400 men. Blackburn arrived at Free French headquarters on 20 June, where he was told that their attack had faltered about 9.3 miles (15 km) south of Damascus.

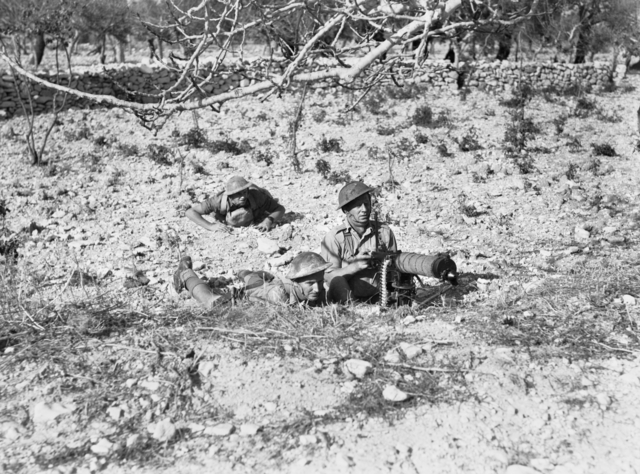
A Vickers machine gun team from the 2/3rd Machine Gun Battalion in Syria

On the left flank of the Free French force was the Australian 2/3rd Infantry Battalion, attacking from the southwest towards the town of Mezze to the west of Damascus. The planned Free French attack was scheduled to go forward at 17:00, but they did not move. Blackburn again drove forward, but the Free French again refused to budge. To get the attack moving, Blackburn ordered one platoon of machine gunners forward to a trench about 1,100 yards (1 km) closer to Damascus. The Vichy French did not fire on them, and the couple of Vichy French tanks that appeared were engaged with Boys anti-tank rifles. The Senegalese Free French troops then came forward to the Australian-held trench. Blackburn then ordered the rest of his men forward. This process, of the Australian machine gunners advancing and the Free French following, was repeated by Blackburn until the forward troops had advanced a total of 3 miles (4.8 km) and reached the outskirts of Damascus. In the latter stages, the Vichy French began to respond with small arms and artillery, and their tanks and snipers forced a halt for the night.

In the meantime, the 2/3rd Infantry Battalion had captured Vichy French positions to the west of Damascus and cut the road to Beirut. In the morning of 21 June, the Free French began to advance; Blackburn's machine gunners supported them and protected their right flank in case of a Vichy French counter-attack from the east. About 11:00 a Vichy French column emerged from Damascus led by a car bearing a white flag. After some discussions, Blackburn accompanied the Vichy French and Free French back into the city, where Blackburn, as the senior Allied commander present, accepted the surrender. Meanwhile, the Vichy French thrust towards Metulla had not reached A Company, and on 16 June the company was ordered forward into support positions for an attack by the 2/2nd Pioneer Battalion on a fort at Merdjayoun. Over several days, the pioneers, fighting as infantry, and the 2/25th Battalion were pitted against the well-held Vichy French positions, until the defenders withdrew on the night of 23 June.

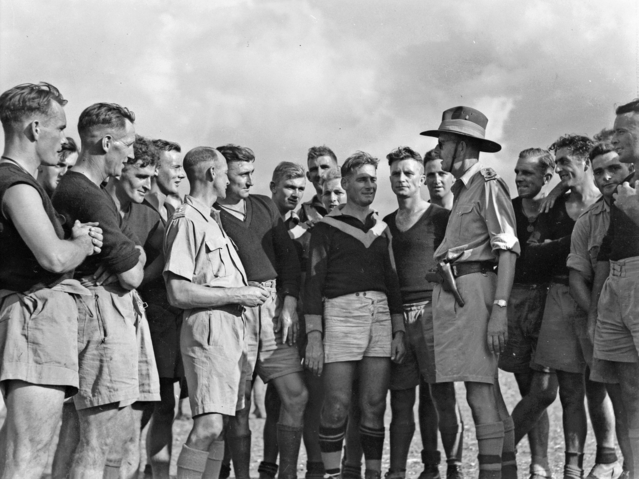
Blackburn speaking to members of his battalion during an Australian Rules Football match in Syria, late 1941. Blackburn is wearing a slouch hat and a German World War I Luger pistol in a holster.

In the short lull after the fall of Damascus, Blackburn's men, less D Company, were scattered over a wide area of the central front supporting the infantry. Blackburn continued to visit his detachments, often displaying a disdainful attitude to incoming artillery fire which amazed his men. With the Vichy French stymied in the centre and the Allies unable to press forward from Damascus, the overall commander, now-Lieutenant General Lavarack, decided to put his main effort into the coastal push towards Beirut. D Company of the 2/3rd, split up among the various infantry battalions pushing up the coast road, fought at Damour in early July, before the Vichy French requested an armistice in mid-July. The battalion suffered 43 casualties during the campaign; nine dead and 34 wounded. At the end of July, Blackburn left the battalion to join the Allied Control Commission for Syria in Beirut, responsible, among other functions, for the repatriation of French prisoners-of-war (POW). He seconded several officers from the 2/3rd to help him, and travelled widely around Syria, and even managed a brief crossing into Turkey. He became involved in trying to arbitrate in the fractious relationship between the captured Vichy French and the Free French who wanted to recruit them, but the Free French were largely unsuccessful in this endeavour, with only 5,700 of the remaining fit 28,000 Vichy soldiers joining their cause.

In the aftermath of the campaign, the 2/3rd stayed on as part of the Allied occupation force established in Syria and Lebanon to defend against a possible drive south by Axis forces through the Caucasus. The battalion defended a position northeast of Beirut, around Bikfaya initially, but was moved around to various locations including Aleppo on the Turkish border throughout the remainder of 1941. They endured a bitter cold and snowy winter at Fih near Tripoli, which was punctuated by leave drafts to Tel Aviv. By this time, Blackburn had returned to the battalion after a stint as president of a court-martial and another inquiry, where his legal skills were put to good use. At Christmas, Blackburn's son, Richard, visited him, on leave from the 9th Division Cavalry Regiment, which was in Palestine.

=== Java ===
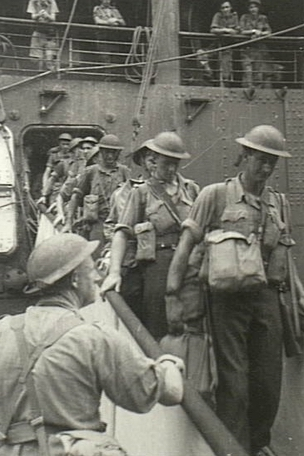
Australian troops (probably of the 2/2nd Pioneer Battalion), disembarking at Tanjung Priok in mid-February 1942

On 14 January 1942, following Japan's entry into the war, the 2/3rd left Fih and travelled south into Palestine. On 1 February, the battalion, less one company and with no machine guns or vehicles, left the Middle East on SS Orcades. Also on Orcades were the 2/2nd Pioneer Battalion, engineers of the 2/6th Field Company, elements of the 2/2nd Anti-Aircraft Regiment and 2/1st Light Anti-Aircraft Regiment, the 105th General Transport Company, 2/2nd Casualty Clearing Station, and sundry others. The ship, rated for 2,000 passengers, was loaded with 3,400. Blackburn, as senior officer on board, was appointed as the commander of the embarked troops, and ensured that the soldiers were kept busy with air raid and lifeboat drills, physical training and lectures. On 10 February, the ship departed Colombo, escorted by British, and later, Australian warships.

Blackburn received orders to put 2,000 of his men ashore at Oosthaven on Sumatra in the Dutch East Indies to help defend an airfield near Palembang, about 190 miles (300 km) north of the port. These men were to be known as "Boostforce". This was in accordance with a plan that involved the 6th and 7th Divisions defending Java and Sumatra respectively. Due to a lack of small arms, some of the troops were equipped with weapons from Orcades' armoury, including outdated and unfamiliar Springfield, Ross and Martini Henry rifles. Some soldiers did not have a firearm at all, and the 2/3rd not only lacked its Vickers guns, it also did not have any Bren light machine guns either. Blackburn was to lead "Boostforce", the objective of which he labelled a "suicide mission", especially given the Japanese had landed paratroops on Sumatra on 14 February. Orcades dropped anchor about 1.9 miles (3 km) offshore. Despite receiving a report that the Japanese were already at Palembang, Blackburn was ordered to disembark his force, and they were ferried ashore by a small Dutch tanker around dusk on 15 February. They were only just disembarking when orders were received to return to Orcades, as the Japanese were only 11 miles (18 km) away from Oosthaven. They were transported back to the ship in the dark, and they weighed anchor in the early hours of the following day. While they had been on their abortive mission, Singapore had fallen.

Orcades was escorted across the Sunda Strait, and about 14:00 on 16 February, it anchored in the outer harbour of Tanjung Priok, the port of Batavia, the capital of the Dutch East Indies. At noon the following day Orcades entered the port, which was gripped by considerable confusion. Australian looters and deserters from Singapore pelted Orcades with tins and other objects. Blackburn sent a party of pioneers ashore to round them up. He gave them the choice of either joining his force or being charged with desertion. Many joined, but their commitment to the force was questionable. The majority of the troops aboard Orcades remained on the ship throughout the rest of the day and all of the next. On 19 February, Blackburn received orders to disembark about 2,000 men, and after several false starts, they went ashore in the early evening.

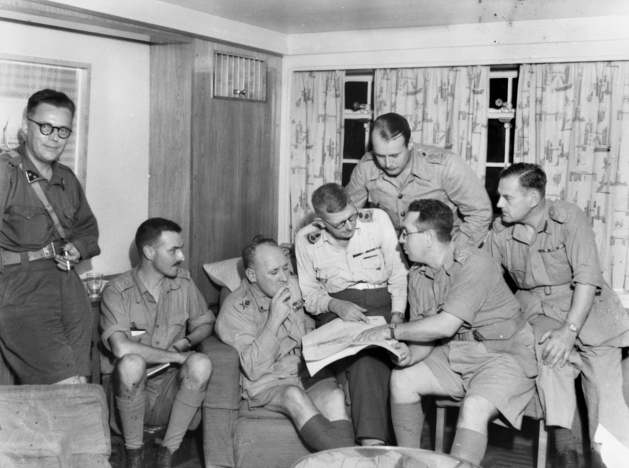
Major General Arthur "Tubby" Allen (centre, seated) and Blackburn (on his left with map), along with other 7th Division officers, examining a map of Java

On 21 February, Blackburn was temporarily promoted to brigadier and appointed to command all 3,000 Australian troops on Java, collectively known as "Blackforce". Blackforce consisted of the 2/3rd Machine Gun Battalion, the 2/2nd Pioneer Battalion, 2/6th Field Company (engineers), a platoon of over-age headquarters guards, 105th General Transport Company, 2/3rd Reserve Motor Transport Company, 2/2nd Casualty Clearing Station, about 165 stragglers and 73 reinforcements. About half of the troops were support rather than combat troops. Blackburn organised his soldiers into three infantry battalions, based on the machine gunners, pioneers and engineers respectively, created a headquarters, and formed a supporting transport and supply unit from the 2/3rd Reserve Motor Transport Company. Blackforce was instructed to fight alongside local Dutch forces under the overall command of the Dutch Luitenant-generaal Hein ter Poorten, but was subordinate to the local Dutch divisional commander, Generaal-majoor W. Schilling, and to the General Officer Commanding British Troops in the Dutch East Indies, Major General Hervey Sitwell. Blackforce was essentially deployed to achieve the political purpose of strengthening the resolve of the Dutch, who, according to the Australian Chief of the General Staff, Lieutenant General Vernon Sturdee, were "entirely immobile ... inexperienced and probably not highly trained".

Based on lessons learnt from the fighting in Malaya and Singapore that highlighted the futility of static defence, Blackburn adopted mobility, counter-flanking movements and defence-in-depth as his maxims for Blackforce. Blackforce was able to re-equip itself to a significant extent from the Tanjung Priok wharves, where it obtained hundreds of Bren machine guns and Thompson submachine guns, grenades, ammunition, and vehicles, from stocks originally intended to re-supply Singapore. Heavy weapons remained in short supply, although a few mortars and light armoured vehicles were available. Blackburn's Dutch commanders directed him to disperse his force to protect five airfields from paratroop drops, orders which Blackburn only grudgingly obeyed, as he was concerned about splitting Blackforce. On 20 February, it divided itself between the various airfields, where its members established defensive positions. Blackburn set up his headquarters in Batavia. On 23 February, Blackburn went to Schilling and asked that he be permitted to concentrate his force for training, but this was refused. The following day, Blackburn was summoned to General Sir Archibald Wavell's American-British-Dutch-Australian Command headquarters in Bandung where he met with Wavell. He was directed to use his force in offensive operations against the Japanese. On 25 February, Sitwell and Schilling permitted Blackforce to be concentrated for this purpose, and Sitwell attached a United States artillery unit, a British signals section, and a squadron of 16 obsolescent light tanks to Blackburn's command.

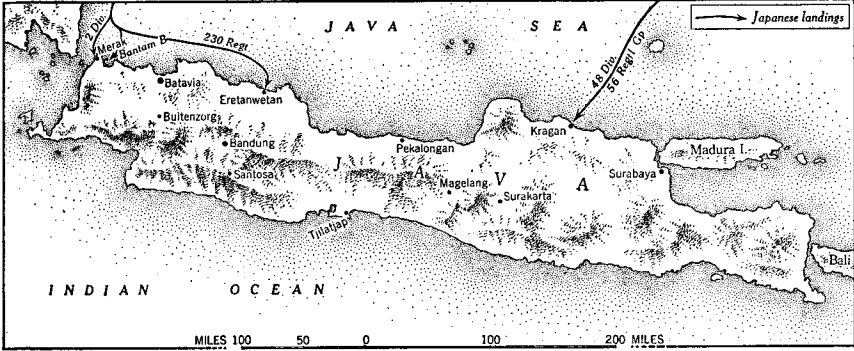
A map showing the Japanese landing points on Java in late February 1942

By 27 February, Blackburn had established his headquarters in Buitenzorg, on the road between Batavia and Bandung. Blackforce was to be kept as a mobile reserve to strike the Japanese once they landed, with the Dutch conducting delaying actions. On the following night, the Japanese landed a division in the Merak area on the northwestern tip of Java, and a regiment east of Batavia at Eretanwetan. Both landings were unopposed, and the regimental one was guided in by fifth-column elements among the population. Another division and additional regiment landed 160 miles (250 km) further east along the Java coast. The Japanese forces that landed on Java numbered 25,000. Arrayed against them was a Dutch force of the same strength with a ratio of one Dutch to 40 locally recruited troops. Many of the local troops viewed the Japanese as liberators from Dutch colonialism rather than an enemy to be resisted.

The Japanese advance from Merak progressed swiftly, covering 37 miles (60 km) by noon on 1 March, with the Dutch putting up little resistance. The Japanese force quickly captured Serang then split into two, with one column pushing east along the north coast towards Batavia and the other driving southeast to Rangkasbitung and Djasinga and preparing to cross the Tjianten River at Leuwiliang to capture Buitenzorg. Initially Blackburn planned a counter-attack against the southern advance for 2 March with the Dutch to hold the Japanese at Djasinga, but this was cancelled when the Dutch withdrew to the Bandung area, 50 miles (80 km) east of Leuwiliang. As part of the withdrawal, the Dutch blew up the 260-foot (80 m) bridge over the Tjianten River at Leuwiliang early on 2 March, severely restricting Blackburn's freedom of manoeuvre against the southern force. He was then ordered by Schilling to move most of his force approximately 100 miles (160 km) east to counter-attack against the regimental-sized force that had landed at Eretanwetan and was advancing south towards Bandung. This order was withdrawn after Blackburn opposed it on the grounds that the Japanese position was not known, the attack would be ill-prepared, and his efforts would be better spent preparing a rearguard defence at Leuwiliang. Sitwell supported Blackburn. Now able to consolidate a position against the southern force, Blackburn disposed two companies of his strongest fighting unit, the 2/2nd Pioneers, in depth along the road just east of Leuwiliang, and kept the remainder of Blackforce in reserve, ready to conduct counter-encirclement operations.

About 12:00 on 2 March, five Japanese light tanks arrived at the destroyed bridge and were promptly engaged by the pioneers. Two tanks were quickly disabled and the remainder withdrew. Blackburn, realising that the Japanese would begin to probe his defences and try to outflank them, ordered his reserves to fan out to the north and south of the main blocking position at Leuwiliang. The Japanese soon tried to cross the river about 270 yards (250 m) south of the bridge, but were met with a hail of fire and withdrew with heavy casualties. Over the next three days, the Japanese tried to outflank and encircle the Australian positions, mainly to the south, but Blackburn deployed his forces to the flanks to check them. On one occasion he withdrew one of his units slightly, drew a significant number of Japanese across the river into a killing ground and caused them serious casualties. Blackburn deployed his last reserves on the afternoon of 4 March, and was finally outflanked to the south that afternoon. He ordered his men to break contact and withdraw closer to Buitenzorg. For the loss of around 100 casualties, Blackforce had held up a divisional-sized Japanese force for three days and killed around 500 Japanese and wounded another 500. The Japanese later stated that they believed that Blackforce was of divisional strength, despite it being only a weak brigade.

Blackburn conducted a fighting withdrawal through a series of fall-back positions to a point just southeast of Buitenzorg, then disengaged and moved back to Sukabumi, about 25 miles (40 km) southeast of Buitenzorg. Blackburn was then given orders to deploy Blackforce into the Bandung perimeter as a mobile reserve. It soon became clear that the Dutch were about to capitulate, and the Commonwealth commanders decided to leave the Dutch and make a stand south of Bandung. Poorten surrendered Java on 8 March, but Blackburn was reluctant to do so, and sought medical advice on the idea of continuing resistance in the hills. He was advised against this course of action due to the likelihood of many soldiers becoming sick with tropical and other diseases, and surrendered his force on 11 March. During the fighting on Java, 36 Australians were killed and 60 were wounded. In his last order to his commanders Blackburn wrote:

You are to take the first opportunity of telling your men that this surrender is not my choice or that of General Sitwell. We were all placed under the command of the Commander in Chief NEI [Netherlands East Indies] [Poorten] and he ordered us to surrender. [emphasis in the original]

=== Captivity ===
Until the end of March, Blackforce was held in towns, including in the Leles market square which had been surrounded by barbed wire. It was then split up, with troops dispersed to different camps. Blackburn was initially told that a significant number of his troops would be sent to Batavia, and that they would have to march the 150 miles (240 km) at a rate of 19 miles (30 km) a day, camping beside the road without shelter during the wet season. Many of the troops already had dysentery and/or malaria, and some were unaccustomed to marching long distances. Blackburn wrote a letter, signed by other Allied commanders, protesting this order. The letter said that men would die if the order was carried out, and that he would hold the Japanese responsible for their deaths. The Japanese rescinded the order and the troops travelled by train, leaving on 13 April. Many of the 2/3rd were sent to another camp.

==== Bicycle Camp ====
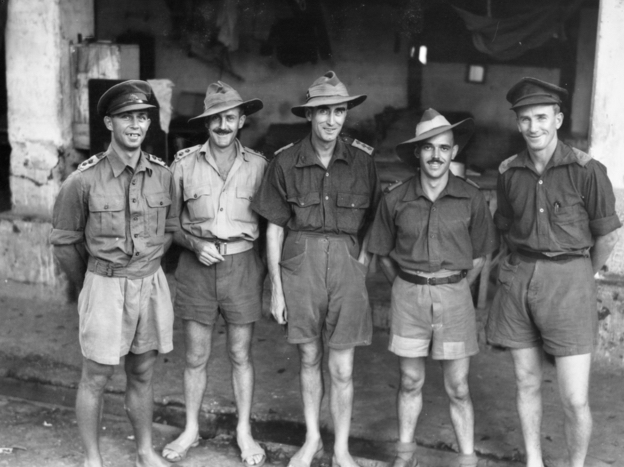
A group of officers of the 2/3rd Machine Gun Battalion in the Bicycle POW Camp, Batavia after their liberation in September 1945

Blackburn arrived at the so-called "Bicycle Camp" in Batavia on 14 April. Sitwell and other more senior officers were sequestered in a fenced-off part of the camp, so Blackburn became the senior officer, with an American colonel, Albert Searle, as his deputy. The camp contained about 2,600 POWs: 2,000 Australians, 200 British, 200 Americans, 100 Indians and 100 Dutch, all packed into a former Dutch barracks designed for 1,000. During his first month at the camp, Blackburn began a diary using an old ledger, which he maintained for much of his internment against the explicit orders of the Japanese. At one point he removed the covers from the ledger and hid the pages inside the lining of his raincoat. The food rations at the Bicycle Camp were poor, and because Japan was not a party to the Geneva Convention Relative to the Treatment of Prisoners of War and did not follow its stipulations, it was difficult to maintain discipline as all but Blackburn had to work regardless of rank.

Blackburn arranged activities to alleviate the boredom and consistently stood up to the Japanese. He was interrogated and was struck by a guard on at least one occasion, but was spared any torture. More junior officers were subjected to torture, beatings and other abuse. The Japanese tried to persuade Blackburn and others to participate in propaganda radio broadcasts, but Blackburn gave orders against it and refused to do so himself. In June, the Japanese ordered all prisoners to sign a form stating that they would comply with all orders and would not resist their captors. Blackburn only signed after appending "except where contrary to my oath of allegiance to His Majesty the King". When another form was produced, requiring an oath to be sworn, Blackburn refused. Privileges were withdrawn, dozens of officers and men were beaten, and Blackburn was placed in solitary confinement. In the end, when the Americans decided to sign, Blackburn agreed in the interests of unity and ordered all the troops to sign. By the end of July, Blackburn was conscious that he had lost about 2 stone (28 lb; 13 kg) in weight due to the poor rations.

Blackburn was promoted to substantive colonel on 1 September 1942, but retained his temporary rank of brigadier whilst in captivity. In the same month, he began to suffer from depression and fell ill with dengue fever. The Japanese commandant was replaced with a stricter man, and the guards were replaced with Koreans, who quickly earned a reputation for cruelty. Beatings were conducted for minor infractions, such as failing to stand to attention quickly enough. In early October, 1,500 POWs left the camp, including almost all of the 2/2nd Pioneers, destined for the Thailand–Burma railway. Another group of 84 left a few days later, but the losses were soon made up by the arrival of several thousand Dutch and 113 Royal Air Force personnel from a camp in Bandung. By this stage, every couple of days a POW was dying in the camp, mainly due to dysentery. By Christmas, conditions had improved somewhat and Blackburn was able to gather enough funds to purchase food for a Christmas dinner. On 28 December he was driven out of the Bicycle Camp to continue his internment elsewhere. The unit historian of the 2/2nd Pioneers later wrote of Blackburn's time at the Bicycle Camp, "His quiet dignity, masking an unquenchable spirit of protest against Japanese injustices, earned him the admiration of the officers and men who shared with him the humiliation of captivity".

==== Changi, Japan and Formosa ====
Blackburn and some other senior officers were transferred from Java to Singapore by ship, arriving on 1 January 1943, and Blackburn was briefly held at the Changi POW Camp. His time there was much more relaxed than on Java, and he enjoyed freedom of movement and the ability to catch up with friends, including his World War I platoon sergeant. There were no beatings, and few Japanese were seen, as the guards were mainly Sikh defectors from the British Indian Army. On 7 January a party of 900 POWs arrived from Java, including a large number of 2/3rd men, led by the surgeon Lieutenant Colonel Ernest "Weary" Dunlop. This group soon ended up on the Thailand-Burma railway with the 2/2nd Pioneers. Blackburn's stay ended on 10 January, but not before Dunlop had given him a list of men who he recommended should be promoted or receive awards after the war.

Map of Formosa showing the location of the Karenko POW Camp

Along with other senior officers, including Sitwell, ter Poorten and Searle, Blackburn was sent to Japan by sea, arriving in Moji on 19 January. After a short stay in a camp that held American and Indian POWs, the party of senior officers left Japan by ship on 25 January, and four days later disembarked in southwestern Formosa (now Taiwan). On arrival at Karenko Camp, the party were paraded before the commandant and ordered to make an oath that they would not try to escape. Blackburn said that he would only sign under protest and duress, and asked what the penalty was for not signing. He was beaten and placed in solitary confinement, and the Japanese subjected him to sleep deprivation. Two days later he signed the oath and was released into the main camp. The Karenko Camp held 400 men, including the most senior Allied officers the Japanese had captured, many of them generals. Food was scarce, everyone was required to work, and seven weeks after arriving, Blackburn's weight was down to 7 stone 3 pounds (46 kg; 101 lb) (101 pounds), 2 stone (28 lb; 13 kg) (28 pounds) lighter than he had been when he had enlisted in 1914.

Blackburn was beaten several times while held at Karenko Camp, as were other senior officers, often for the most minor of supposed infractions. Blackburn's closest friends were Sitwell and Searle. On 2 April, all prisoners above the rank of colonel were sent to a new camp at Tamasata, about 62 miles (100 km) south of Karenko. Searle was left behind, and Sitwell was allocated to a different barracks from Blackburn. He found some of his fellow POWs difficult to get on with, particularly the Australian Brigadiers Harold Burfield Taylor and Duncan Maxwell. With the arrival of Red Cross food parcels in April, Blackburn put on almost 11 pounds (5 kg) (11 pounds). The reduced work routine compared to Karenko contributed to this. Boredom and depression dogged Blackburn during this period, and the lack of letters from home exacerbated both. Also in April, Blackburn's family finally received confirmation he was alive, having heard nothing since his capture. In early June, he and 89 other POWs were returned to Karenko, but this stay was brief, as they were soon transported to another camp in Shirakawa in central Formosa, arriving there on 8 June. The food was again poor, malaria was rife, and the POWs were again required to work. By late August, Blackburn had lost a total of 4 stone 6 pounds (28 kg) (61 pounds) since his capture in March 1942.

Blackburn's eyesight, which had been deteriorating for some time, became so bad that he could not read for more than half an hour. This contributed to his depression, which again took hold, accompanied by recurring nightmares. By early 1944, Blackburn had been in captivity for nearly two years, but had not received a single letter from his family. They had been writing regularly, but the letters failed to get through. His health was poor, with multiple ailments and severe headaches. It was not until 29 March that he received a letter, dated 30 September 1942. In mid-1944, he received ten letters at once, and discovered that his son Robert had been married. In late September, Blackburn and the other senior officers were transported to Heito in southern Formosa and flown to Japan, Pusan in Korea, and from there by train to Manchuria.

==== Manchuria and liberation ====
The new camp was Chen Cha Tung POW Camp, located about 200 miles (320 km) northwest of Mukden on the edge of the Gobi Desert. The party all signed the usual form promising not to escape, having long ago decided they were worthless and resistance was futile. Despite the cold and bleak surroundings, the conditions were in some respects better than in previous camps. Blackburn stopped keeping a diary soon after arrival, as he had run out of ledger paper and was in deep depression. Due to the cold, there were few activities, and most of the prisoners refused to volunteer to work growing vegetables as they did not trust the Japanese to give them a fair share of the produce. In May 1945, the party was transferred to the Hoten POW Camp on the outskirts of Mukden. Blackburn considered this camp the best of all those he had been held in during the war, with showers and hot baths, although the latrines were always overflowing and the food was poor. Blackburn had received no letters since arriving in Manchuria, and this contributed to his depression. On 15 August, the POWs were told that the war was over, and a few days later, a Soviet Red Army tank drove through the camp fence and they were liberated. Searching the offices afterwards, the POWs found thousands of letters and three months' worth of Red Cross food packages. Within days of liberation, Blackburn was on an aircraft, returning to Australia.

=== Return to Australia ===
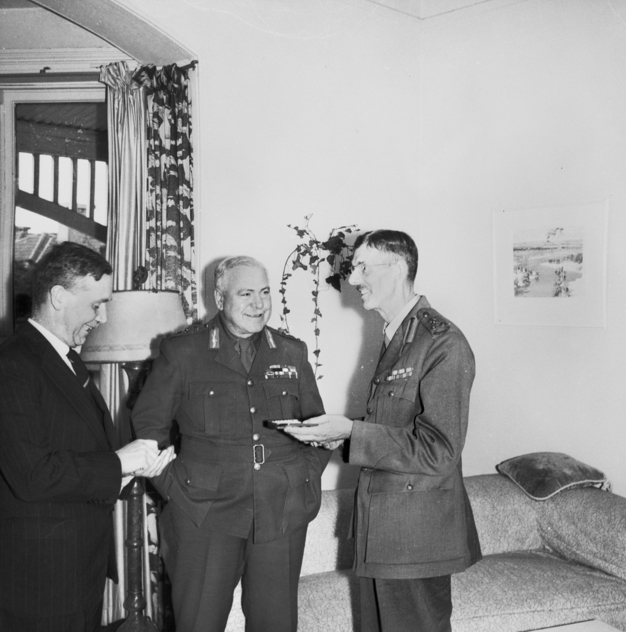
General Sir Thomas Blamey meeting with Blackburn (right) after his repatriation to Australia

Blackburn's return to Australia was circuitous. He first flew to Sian then Kunming in China, where he spent 36 hours in hospital. The next flight was across the Himalayas to Calcutta in British India where he was hospitalised for another 36 hours. The next destination was Colombo, after which he flew to Perth, Australia, arriving on 13 September. On the same day he was flown to Melbourne with a short stop in Adelaide, as he was required to report to Army Headquarters and deliver official documents he had kept during his internment. His family travelled by train to Melbourne to meet him. They met at the railway station, and were shocked at his appearance. At this point, Blackburn only weighed 6 stone 4 pounds (40 kg) (88 pounds). After a week in Melbourne, the family returned to Adelaide, and Blackburn was hospitalised for two weeks.

On arrival in Adelaide, he was greeted by three other VC recipients, Phillip Davey, Roy Inwood and Thomas Caldwell. On the Sunday after his return, 62 former members of the 2/3rd who had not been offloaded in Java marched up his street and stood to attention. They too were shocked at his appearance. On 9 May 1946, he was awarded the Efficiency Decoration. On 28 May, he was made a Commander of the Order of the British Empire (Military Division) (CBE) for his gallant and distinguished service in Java. His citation for the CBE noted that:

'Blackforce', which he commanded, was very hastily organised and equipped. It included English, both RAF and Army, and Australian units and personnel. Some, who had left Singapore under very dubious circumstances, were of doubtful quality. Thanks to Brigadier Blackburn's excellent leadership and personal example the little force fought splendidly. Discipline and morale remained high throughout.

This was followed by an additional period in hospital in June and July. Blackburn's Second AIF appointment was terminated on 18 July, at which time he relinquished his temporary rank of brigadier and was transferred to the Reserve of Officers List. He was also granted the honorary rank of brigadier. In addition to the CBE, Blackburn was also awarded the 1939–1945 Star, Pacific Star, Defence Medal, War Medal 1939–1945 and Australia Service Medal 1939–1945 for his service during World War II. Both of Blackburn's sons, Richard and Robert, served in the Second AIF during World War II.

== Later life ==
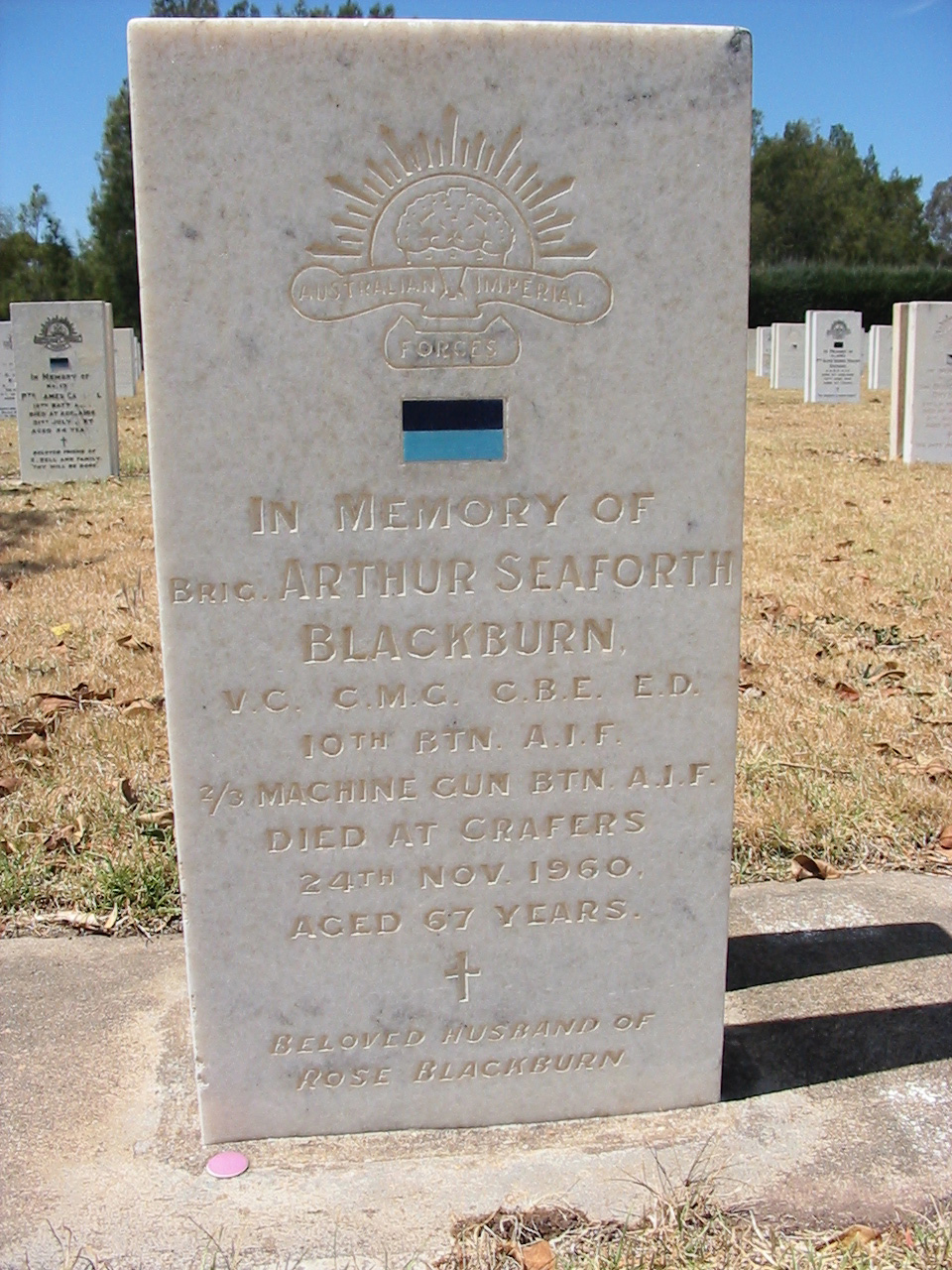
Blackburn's gravestone in the AIF section of West Terrace Cemetery

On 11 October 1946, Blackburn was again appointed to active duty from the Reserve of Officers List, and was again temporarily promoted to brigadier while he was attached to 2nd Australian War Crimes Section as a witness before the International Military Tribunal for the Far East in Tokyo, Japan. Despite his willing involvement, he believed that the trials targeted mainly those who physically participated in crimes, rather than those that ordered them. In December, he was again elected as state president of the renamed Returned Sailors' Soldiers' and Airmen's Imperial League of Australia (RSSAILA), supported by McCann, who was elected as a vice-president. He continued to advocate on behalf of veterans, and took a special interest in the surviving men of the 2/3rd. On 11 January 1947, Blackburn was transferred back to the Reserve of Officers List, retaining the honorary rank of brigadier.

Blackburn was unable to return to private legal practice due to his health, relinquished his role as city coroner in 1947, and was appointed as one of the fifteen inaugural conciliation commissioners of the Commonwealth Court of Conciliation and Arbitration, a position he held until 1955. Given his political history and involvement with the suppression of dockside workers by the "Citizen's Defence Brigade" in 1928, the South Australian convention of the Australian Labor Party expressed "grave alarm" at his appointment. He was also chairman of trustees for the Services Canteen Trust Fund from 1947 until his death. Blackburn was re-elected as president of RSSAILA in 1948. On 8 June 1949, Blackburn was appointed as the honorary colonel of the Adelaide University Regiment (AUR), and he was transferred to the Retired List in January 1950 with the honorary rank of brigadier. In September of the same year he relinquished his role as state president of RSSAILA. In 1953, he was awarded the Queen Elizabeth II Coronation Medal. He relinquished his honorary colonel role with AUR in January 1955. In 1955, he was appointed as a member of the Australian National Airlines Commission and a director of Trans Australia Airlines. He also served on the Television Broadcaster's Board, overseeing the introduction of that medium into South Australia, and was a trustee of the Civilian Internees Trust Fund and Prisoners of War Trust Fund. For his "exceptionally fine honorary service as chairman of several trusts, especially for the benefit of ex-servicemen and their dependants", he was appointed a Companion of the Order of St Michael and St George in the 1955 New Year Honours. The following year, Blackburn and his wife attended the VC centenary gathering in London, and visited the Pozières battlefield in France.

Blackburn died on 24 November 1960 at Crafers, South Australia, aged 67, from a ruptured aneurism of the common iliac artery, and was buried with full military honours in the AIF section of Adelaide's West Terrace Cemetery. Many members of the public and hundreds of former members of the 10th Battalion and 2/3rd Machine Gun Battalion lined the 1.9-mile (3 km) route between St Peter's Cathedral and the cemetery, and eight brigadiers were pallbearers. His medal set, including his VC, was passed to his son Richard, then to his grandson Tom. It is on loan to the Australian War Memorial, Canberra, where it is displayed in the Hall of Valour.

The Department of Veterans' Affairs office in Adelaide was named "Blackburn House" in 1991. As of 2008 there were eleven streets in Adelaide named for Blackburn, and one in Brisbane. In 2008, it was debated whether to call the new tunnel under Anzac Highway either the Blackburn Underpass or Inwood Underpass, after another South Australian who was also conferred a VC in 1917, Roy Inwood. The Returned & Services League of Australia objected that naming the tunnel after a specific veteran was inappropriate, saying it should be named after a major World War I battleground, in line with the highway's theme. On completion, the tunnel was named the Gallipoli Underpass.

In 2023, a commissioned portrait of Blackburn was hung in Parliament House, Adelaide, where he served as a Member of Parliament.

== Footnotes ==
South Australian House of Assembly
Preceded by Crawford Vaughan	Member for Sturt; 1918–1921; Served alongside: Thomas Hyland Smeaton, Edward Vardon	Succeeded by Herbert Richards
