= Roy Inwood =

Australian Victoria Cross recipient (1890–1971)

Roy Inwood VC
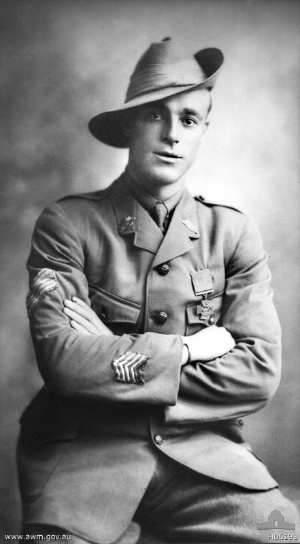
- Sergeant Roy Inwood c. 1918
- Born: Reginald Roy Inwood; 14 July 1890; North Adelaide, South Australia
- Died: 23 October 1971 (aged 81); St Peters, South Australia
- Military career
- Allegiance: Australia
- Branch: Australian Army
- Service years: 1914–1918; 1939–1944
- Rank: Warrant Officer Class One
- Units: 10th Battalion (1914–1918); Australian Provost Corps (1939–1943); Military Prison and Detention Barracks Service (1943–1944)
- Conflicts: World War I; Gallipoli campaign; Landing at Anzac Cove; Western Front; Battle of Mouquet Farm; Battle of Lagnicourt; Second Battle of Bullecourt; Battle of Menin Road; World War II
- Awards: Victoria Cross

Reginald Roy Inwood, VC (14 July 1890 – 23 October 1971) was an Australian soldier and recipient of the Victoria Cross, the highest award for gallantry in battle that could be awarded to a member of the Australian armed forces at the time. Inwood enlisted in the Australian Imperial Force in August 1914, and along with the rest of the 10th Battalion, he landed at Anzac Cove, Gallipoli, on 25 April 1915. He fought at Anzac until being evacuated sick to Egypt in September. He remained there until he rejoined his unit on the Western Front in June 1916. In August, he fought in the Battle of Mouquet Farm.

In 1917, Inwood was with his battalion when it fought in the Battle of Lagnicourt in April, then the Second Battle of Bullecourt the following month. During the Battle of Menin Road in September, he was involved in the elimination of a German machine-gun post and other actions, for which he was awarded the Victoria Cross. He reached the rank of sergeant before being sent back to Australia in August 1918. During World War II, he volunteered for service in the Citizens Military Forces, and reached the rank of warrant officer class one, serving in the Australian Provost Corps and Military Prison and Detention Barracks Service. After the war he returned to work with the City of Adelaide, and upon his death he was buried with full military honours in the AIF Cemetery, West Terrace. His medals are displayed in the Adelaide Town Hall.

== Early life ==
Born Reginald Roy Inwood on 14 July 1890 at North Adelaide, South Australia, he was the eldest son of Edward Inwood and his wife Mary Anne née Minney. He had an older sister and three younger brothers. Roy was educated first at the North Adelaide Public School, and after the family moved to Broken Hill, New South Wales, he attended the Broken Hill Model School. After completing his schooling, he found work in the local mining industry, where he was employed at the outbreak of World War I.

== World War I ==
=== Gallipoli campaign ===
On 24 August 1914, Inwood enlisted as a private in the Australian Imperial Force (AIF) and joined the 10th Battalion, 3rd Brigade, 1st Division. The 10th Battalion underwent its initial training at Morphettville, South Australia, before embarking on the troopship HMAT A11 Ascanius at Outer Harbor on 20 October. At the time of embarkation, the full battalion strength was 1,023 men. Sailing via Fremantle and Colombo, Ceylon, the ship arrived at Alexandria, Egypt, on 6 December, and the troops disembarked. They then boarded trains for Cairo where they entered camp at Mena in the shadow of the Great Pyramid of Giza on the following day, along with the rest of the AIF. After Inwood arrived in Egypt, his brother Robert Minney Inwood enlisted and was also allotted to the 10th Battalion. While at Mena, Roy Inwood performed duties as a mounted policeman. They remained at Mena until 28 February 1915, when they entrained for Alexandria. They embarked on the British troopship HMT Ionian on 1 March, and a few days later arrived at the port of Mudros on the Greek island of Lemnos in the northeastern Aegean Sea, where they remained on board for the next seven weeks.

The 3rd Brigade had been chosen as the covering force for the landing at Anzac Cove, Gallipoli, on 25 April. The brigade embarked on the battleship HMS Prince of Wales and the destroyer HMS Foxhound, and after transferring to strings of rowing-boats initially towed by steam pinnaces, the battalion began rowing ashore about 4:30 a.m. Inwood participated in the heavy fighting at the landing, and other than a short period in hospital in May, was involved in the subsequent trench warfare defending the beachhead, being promoted to lance corporal in August. In early May, Robert had joined the battalion on Gallipoli. In September Roy was evacuated sick to Egypt, initially with gastritis and then with rheumatism, and remained there recuperating while the 10th Battalion was withdrawn to Lemnos in November, and subsequently back to Egypt.

=== Western Front ===
==== 1916 ====
The battalion underwent reorganisation and training in Egypt then sailed for France in March 1916 where it was committed to fighting on the Western Front in June. Inwood did not rejoin his battalion until 30 July, and was promoted to temporary corporal two weeks later in the wake of the 327 casualties suffered by the unit during its first major action on the Western Front, the Battle of Pozières. Among those killed was Roy's brother, Robert, by then a sergeant. In mid-to-late August, the battalion was committed to the Battle of Mouquet Farm, during which it suffered another 335 casualties.

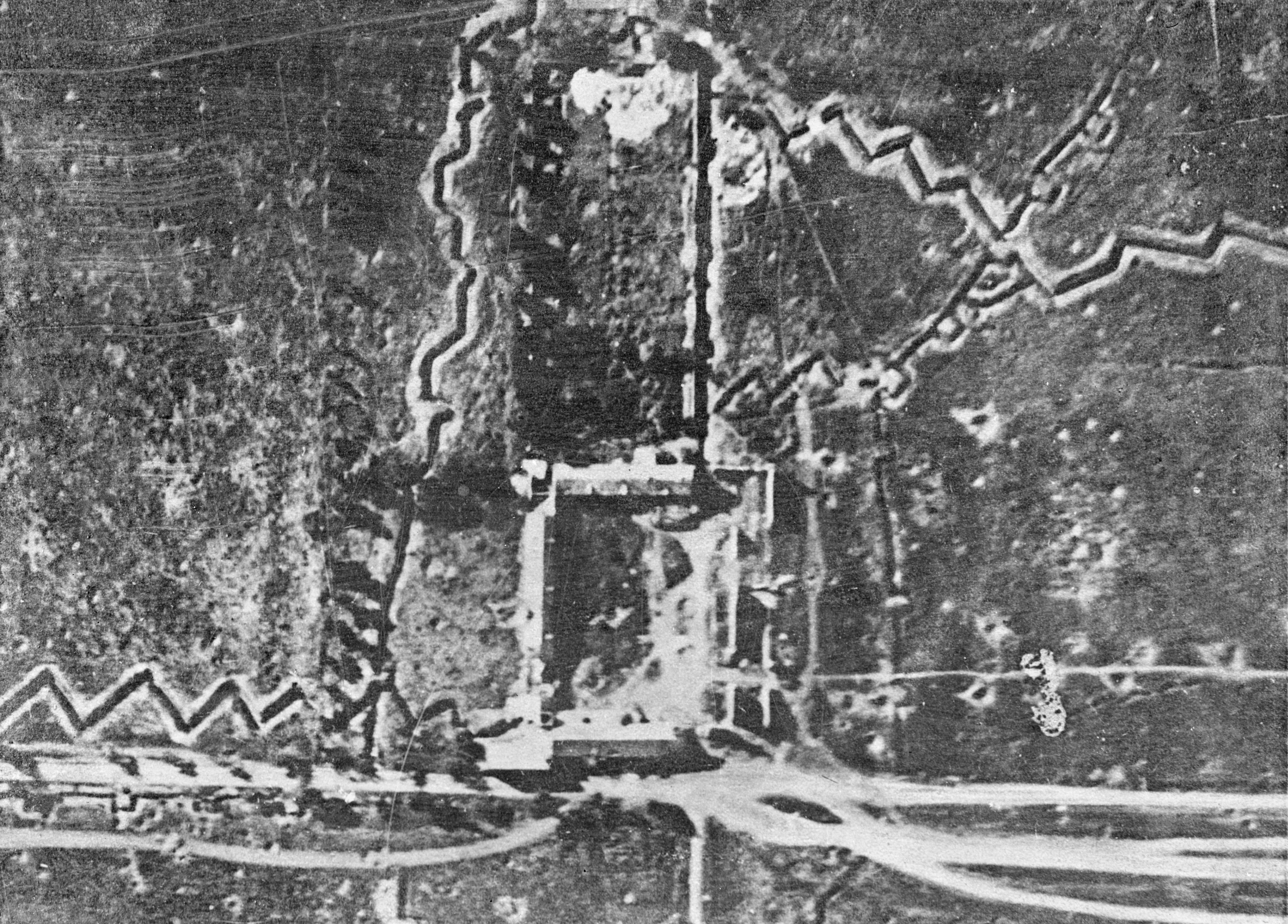
Mouquet Farm and its defences, June 1916

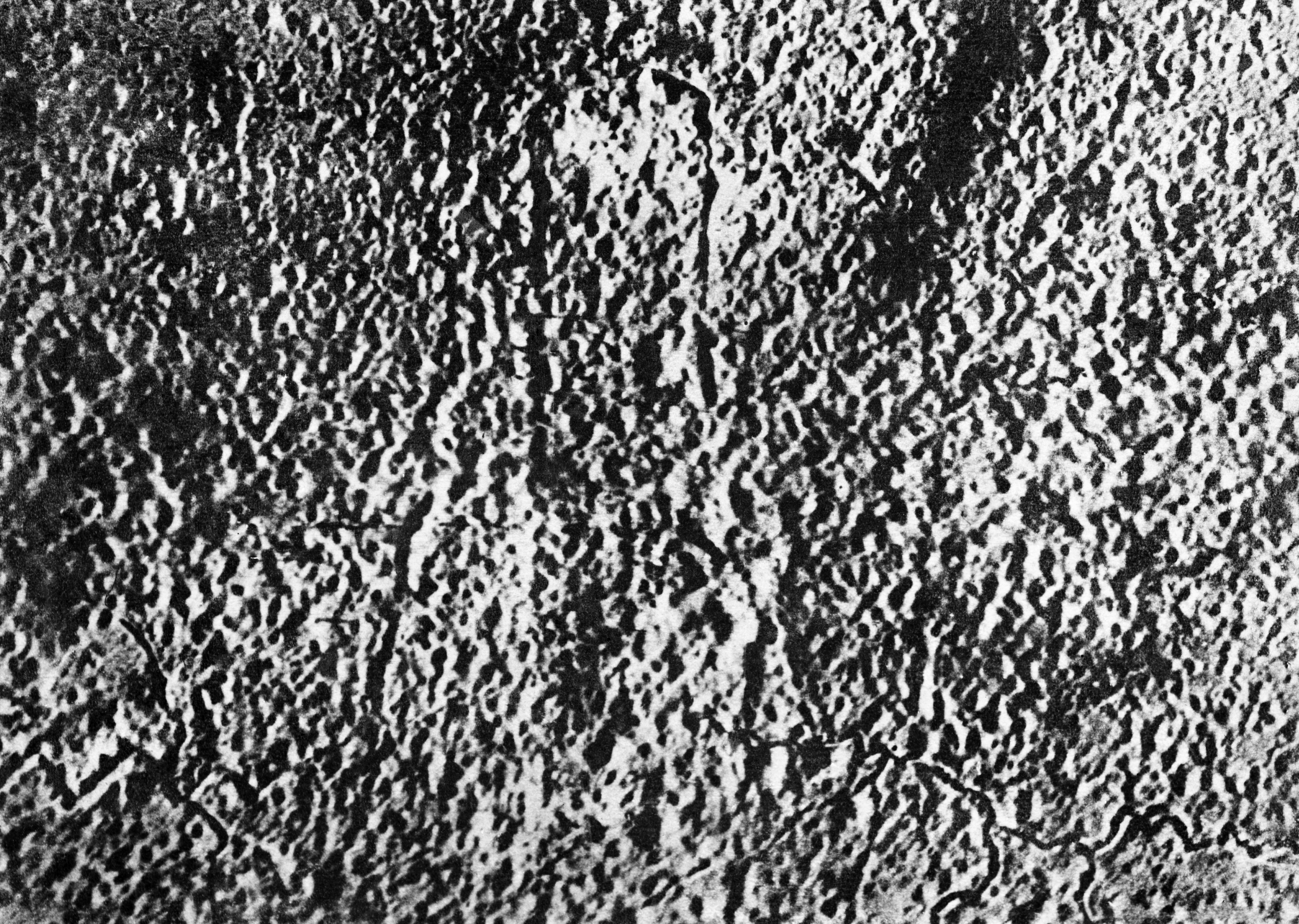
Mouquet Farm and its defences, September 1916

The battalion was then sent to rest and recuperate for a few weeks at a camp near Poperinge in Belgium, before returning to the front line at Hill 60 near Zillebeke in late September, having absorbed replacements. After being relieved in early October, the 10th Battalion was again withdrawn to camps in the rear, where they remained until early November. While in camp in October, Inwood was charged with absence without leave and reduced in rank to private. The battalion then returned to the front line near Gueudecourt, France, until 12 November, and was then withdrawn into rear areas until a stint in the support trenches at Flers in early December. On 10 December, Inwood was evacuated to hospital due to problems with his feet, and did not rejoin his unit until just after Christmas.

==== 1917 ====
Once Inwood returned to the battalion, it was involved in fatigue duties, then training, before moving back into the front line at Le Barque near Bazentin in mid-February 1917. On 25 February, the battalion was involved in an attack in the same sector, incurring about 20 per cent casualties. It was relieved on the same day, initially moving back into support trenches, before marching to the rear a few days later.

Inwood and the rest of the battalion spent March 1917 in reserve and rest areas while Allied forces advanced towards the Hindenburg Line after the German withdrawal, before moving forward into the front line north of Louverval in early April. The unit was in a support role when the Germans counter-attacked during the Battle of Lagnicourt on 15 April; the battalion suffered only 11 casualties. Relieved soon after, the unit went into rear areas where it performed fatigue duties and salvage until 5 May when it entered the line near Bullecourt. Over the following three days, Inwood and the rest of the battalion were involved in the Second Battle of Bullecourt, during which the unit suffered 182 casualties. From mid-May until mid-September, the 10th Battalion was out of the line in rest areas, undergoing training and engaging in sports.

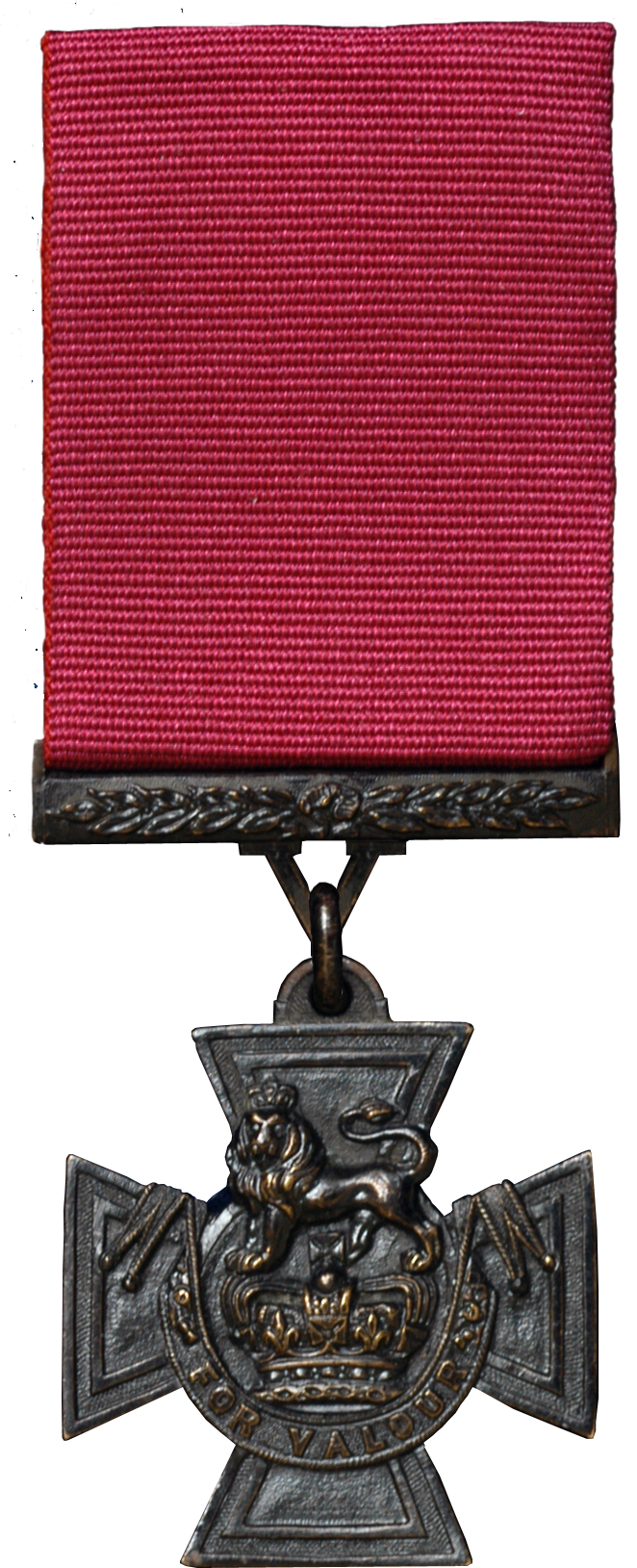
The Victoria Cross

The battalion went into action at Polygon Wood on 19 September during the Battle of Menin Road. Attacking the second objective along the west edge of Polygon Wood with the rest of his unit, Inwood moved forward of the friendly artillery barrage and single-handedly captured a German post, killing several enemy and taking nine prisoners. He then volunteered for an all-night patrol, during which he went forward 600 yards (550 m) and sent back valuable information about enemy dispositions. The fighting continued over the next few days, and on the early morning of 21 September, while the battalion was consolidating, Inwood located a German machine-gun post that was causing considerable trouble for his unit. He went forward and bombed it, killing all the Germans in the post except one, who he forced to carry the machine gun back to the Australian lines. In this latter action, Inwood was assisted, albeit apparently briefly, by an unidentified soldier from the 7th Battalion. Inwood was recommended for the Victoria Cross (VC) for his actions. His actions had stunned the entire battalion. The VC was the highest award for gallantry in battle that could be awarded to a member of the Australian armed forces at the time.

The 10th Battalion suffered 207 casualties during the Battle of Menin Road. Inwood was again promoted to lance corporal on 28 September, after which he went on leave to the United Kingdom. On his return, he was promoted to corporal, and then spent several weeks at the 3rd Brigade training school. The 10th Battalion rotated through support, reserve and rest areas throughout November 1917. Inwood's VC citation was published on 26 November 1917, and read:

For most conspicuous bravery and devotion to duty during the advance to the second objective. He moved forward through our barrage alone to an enemy strong post and captured it, together with nine prisoners, killing several of the enemy. During the evening he volunteered for a special all night patrol, which went out 600 yards in front of our line, and there – by his coolness and sound judgment – obtained and sent back very valuable information as to the enemy's movements. In the early morning of the 21 September, Private Inwood located a machine gun which was causing several casualties. He went out alone and bombed the gun and team, killing all but one, whom he brought in as a prisoner with the gun.

— The London Gazette, 23 November 1917

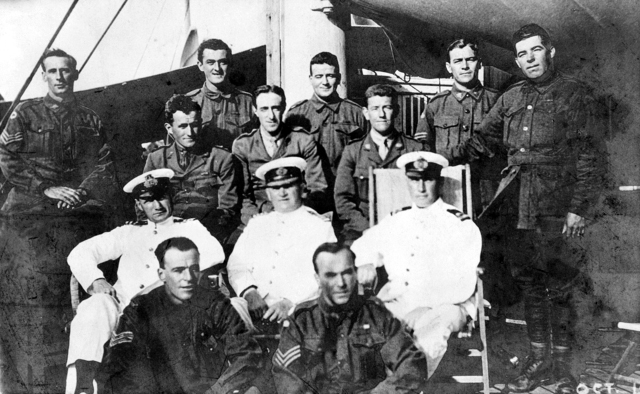
Inwood (seated on deck on the left), during his repatriation to Australia in August–October 1918, along with nine other VC recipients

Inwood had another two weeks' leave in the United Kingdom immediately prior to Christmas 1917, during which he was invested with his VC by King George V at Buckingham Palace on 12 December.

==== 1918 ====
The 10th Battalion continued to rotate through front line, support, reserve and rest areas until mid-April 1918 when it travelled north by train, and was involved in an attack at Méteren on 24–25 April, during which it suffered 79 casualties. This was the last fighting that Inwood experienced, as he was sent to the United Kingdom on 29 April, where he was involved in training for several months. He was repatriated to Australia along with nine other VC recipients in August 1918, to take part in a recruiting campaign on the invitation of Prime Minister Billy Hughes. He disembarked from the troopship HMAT A7 Medic in Adelaide on 11 October, and was discharged on 12 December, the war having ended on 11 November.

Inwood rose to the rank of sergeant by the end of his service. As well as the Victoria Cross, he received the 1914–15 Star, British War Medal and Victory Medal for his service in World War I. As well as Robert, his other younger brother also served; Private Harold Ray Inwood served with the 43rd Battalion and returned to Australia in 1917 after being wounded.

== Interwar period ==
Inwood returned to a hero's welcome in Broken Hill in October 1918 but at an event organised in his honour gave a controversial public speech. He claimed he had "been stoned by mongrels at the train", when he had departed to fight and with his return "those mongrels were the first to shake me by the hand". Newly enlisted soldiers had been hooted and jeered at by militant socialists in Broken Hill on their departure, but there is no evidence stones were thrown. Inwood went on to assert that, "If the boys stick together like they did in France there will be no Bolshevikism in this town ... I would like to be at one end of the street with a machine-gun and have them at the other end". The far-left Australian Labor Party Member for Barrier in the Australian House of Representatives, Michael Considine, accused Inwood of trying "to incite trouble between returned soldiers and the working classes". Inwood subsequently apologised for his comments.

No longer welcome in Broken Hill due to his comments, Inwood moved to Adelaide where he married a 23-year-old widow, Mabel Alice Collins, née Weber, on 31 December 1918. In 1919, he was charged with assault and fined. Inwood had difficulty in finding work, and he and Mabel divorced in 1921. He then moved to Queenstown, Tasmania, to work in the mines, and then back to Kangaroo Island in South Australia, where he worked in a eucalyptus distillery. Inwood married Evelyn Owens in 1927. Returning to Adelaide, he was employed by the Adelaide City Council as a labourer from 1928 onwards. By 1937, Evelyn had died.

== World War II ==
Less than a month after the outbreak of World War II, Inwood volunteered for service in the Citizens Military Forces and again enlisted as a private, although he was promoted to sergeant within a week. In March 1940 he was transferred to the 4th Military District (4 MD) Australian Provost Corps (military police) section, and was promoted to staff sergeant. He was then transferred to the 4 MD detention barracks staff in November. He went on leave for three weeks in January–February 1941, and was transferred back to the provost section, later provost company, in November, and two weeks later was promoted to warrant officer class two. In April 1942, he was temporarily promoted to warrant officer class one, before being transferred back to a detention barracks in August. Inwood married Louise Elizabeth Gates in 1942, and this was a happy marriage. In June 1943, Inwood was transferred from the Australian Provost Corps to the Military Prison and Detention Barracks Service, and was then posted around various detention barracks, being substantively promoted to warrant officer class one in November 1943. Aged 54, he was medically discharged on 30 November 1944 due to a deterioration in his overall health. For his service in World War II, Inwood received the War Medal 1939–1945 and Australia Service Medal 1939–1945. He was also awarded the King George VI Coronation Medal and later the Queen Elizabeth II Coronation Medal.

== Post-war ==
Inwood returned to the Adelaide City Council where he continued working until 1955. He attended the VC centenary celebrations in London the following year. For many years he lived at Norwood, and he died on 23 October 1971 at St Peters. He was given a military funeral and buried at the West Terrace AIF Cemetery, Adelaide. Despite his three marriages, he had no children. Inwood maintained strong links with his 10th Battalion comrades over the years, and always marched alongside them in the Adelaide Anzac Day Commemorative March. According to his Australian Dictionary of Biography entry, Inwood was "rugged, independent and well-built", but gave the impression that his VC "had not done him much good".

== Memorial controversies ==
Inwood's grave at the West Terrace AIF Cemetery

In his will, Inwood bequeathed all his war medals to the 10th Battalion Club, who indicated they would donate the VC to the Australian War Memorial. Inwood objected and stated he wanted the medal to remain in Adelaide. In June 1971, with Inwood's consent, the 10th Battalion Club decided to present the VC to the city upon his death. On 25 September 1972, his medals were handed over. They were displayed in the Adelaide Town Hall from 1972 until 1989, when it was decided to place them in a high security vault while a replica medal set was put on display.

In 2005 Inwood's VC became the centre of considerable media and community debate with calls for it to be displayed in the Australian War Memorial's Hall of Valour. After consulting with the Inwood family and other interested parties, it was decided to honour Inwood's dying wishes. In December 2005, funds were allocated to provide security so the original VC could be displayed in the Adelaide Town Hall. In 2007 the debate regarding the sensitive subject briefly reignited.

The 10th Battalion Other Ranks' Mess at the Torrens Parade Ground, Adelaide, was called the Roy Inwood VC Club. In 2008, it was debated whether to call the new tunnel under Anzac Highway either the "Inwood Underpass" or "Blackburn Underpass", after fellow South Australian and 10th Battalion soldier Arthur Blackburn, who was awarded the VC during the Battle of Pozières while fighting alongside Inwood's brother Robert, before Robert was killed. The Returned & Services League of Australia objected that naming the tunnel after a specific veteran was inappropriate, saying it should be named after a major World War I battleground, in line with the highway's theme. On completion, the tunnel was named the Gallipoli Underpass.
