= Ruthven Blackburn =

Australian medical academic (1913–2016)

Ruthven Blackburn AC
- Born: Charles Ruthven Bickerton Blackburn; 7 May 1913
- Died: 12 April 2016 (aged 102)
- Occupation: Medical Professor
- Family: Sir Charles Bickerton Blackburn

Charles Ruthven Bickerton Blackburn (7 May 1913 – 12 April 2016) was an Australian physician who was a professor of medicine at the University of Sydney.

The son of Sir Charles Bickerton Blackburn (22 April 1874 – 20 July 1972), an Australian university chancellor and physician, during World War II Ruthven Blackburn was Commanding and Senior Physician of the Land Headquarters Medical Research Unit (LHQ, 1MRU), Australian Army Medical Corps (AAMC).

In 1940, he married Eleanor Freeman (1916–1967); they had two daughters, Susan Ann and Sandra. In 1968, he married colleague and asthma researcher Ann Woolcock (1937–2001). The couple raised two sons, Simon and Angus.

In 2006, he was appointed a Companion of the Order of Australia (AC) in recognition of his service to the development of academic medicine and medical education in Australia.

Blackburn died on 12 April 2016, aged 102.
