= Thomas Blackburn (entomologist) =

English-born Australian entomologist (1844 – 1912)

The Reverend Thomas Blackburn
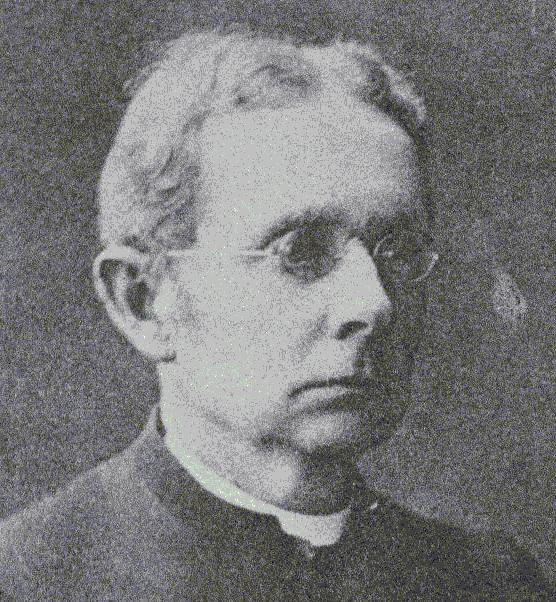
- Born: 16 March 1844; Islington, near Liverpool, England
- Died: 28 May 1912 (aged 68); Woodville, South Australia
- Education: University of London
- Children: Arthur Blackburn; Charles Blackburn

Thomas Blackburn (16 March 1844 – 28 May 1912) was an English-born Australian priest and entomologist who specialized in the study of beetles.

Born near Liverpool, England, Blackburn became interested in entomology in his youth. At the age of 18, with his brother, he began publishing and editing the periodical The Weekly Entomologist; this ceased publication two years later, after which he became one of the editors of the newly founded Entomologist's Monthly Magazine. In 1866, he entered the University of London, from which he received a B.A. degree in 1868. Ordained a priest of the Church of England in 1870, he served for six years as a parish priest at Greenhithe, Kent.

In 1876, Blackburn was transferred to the Hawaiian Islands, where he served as senior priest and chaplain to the bishop of the Church of Hawaii in Honolulu. During his time there, he collected insects extensively on Oahu and also made brief collecting journeys to other islands of the archipelago. "The first resident naturalist to concentrate on insects", he "supplied scientists at the British Museum in London and elsewhere with a steady stream of specimens, refuting the belief that insects were poorly represented in Hawai'i." Among his discoveries were 23 previously undescribed species of carabid beetles of the tribe Platynini.

Blackburn was transferred to Australia in 1882, becoming rector of St. Thomas' Church in Port Lincoln from 1882 to 1886, then of St. Margaret's in Woodville, where he remained for the rest of his life. After his arrival in Australia, his entomological studies were focused almost exclusively on coleoptera, specimens of which he collected throughout South Australia, as well as on trips to the other states. He also studied, classified, and described specimens sent to him by numerous other collectors throughout the continent. In the words of his obituarist Arthur Lea, Curator of Entomology at the South Australian Museum, "He was a systematist, pure and simple, taking no interest, or, at any rate, very little, in the life histories of the insects themselves." Specializing in the Scarabaeidae, he "became the foremost Australian coleopterist, and published descriptions of 3,069 Australian species". He was a member of the Linnean Society of New South Wales and the Australasian Association for the Advancement of Science, and from 1887 until his death was Honorary Curator of Entomology for the South Australian Museum. A significant part of his collections, including most of his type material, is housed at the Natural History Museum, London.

Among Blackburn's children were Charles Blackburn and Arthur Blackburn; a grandson was Richard Blackburn. A great-granddaughter of Blackburn's, the biological researcher Elizabeth Blackburn, shared the 2009 Nobel Prize in Physiology or Medicine for her work in the study of telomeres.

== See also ==
- Category:Taxa named by Thomas Blackburn (entomologist)
