= Ethel Sarah Davidson =

Australian military nurse

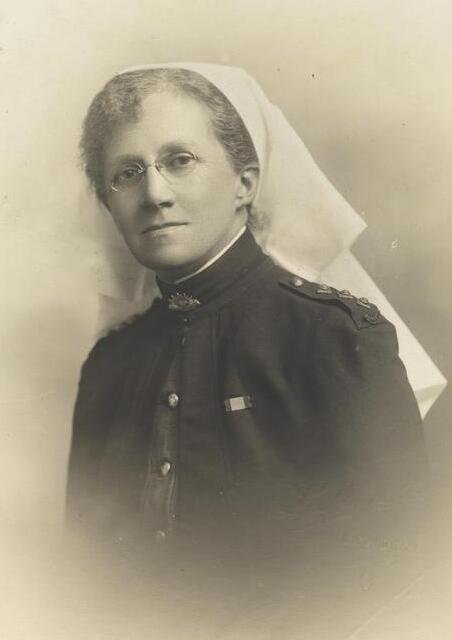
- Born: 19 June 1872; Adelaide, South Australia
- Died: 21 April 1939 (aged 66); Semaphore, South Australia
- Education: Adelaide hospital
- Occupation: matron
- Known for: Military awards as leading WW1 matron

Ethel Sarah Davidson CBE, RRC (19 June 1872 – 21 April 1939) was an Australian military nurse who was awarded the Royal Red Cross and she became a Commander of the Most Excellent Order of the British Empire (CBE).

== Life ==
Davidson was born in 1872 in Tenderton near Adelaide. In May 1877 she became an orphan. Her father who was a master mariner was the captain of the brigantine Emily Smith at Kangaroo Island when it ran aground. Her parents, her three siblings, and about sixteen others drowned when the boat was wrecked. She was daughter of her father's second marriage and she went to live in Adelaide with her elder six half-siblings. She trained as a nurse at Adelaide hospital.

When the First World War started she had been a member of the Australian Army Nursing Service for ten years. She was working as a district nurse, but she one of the first nurses to be sent abroad. She was posted as a sister to Egypt arriving at the end of 1914. In 1916 she was working in Cairo when her service was recognised with a second class Royal Red Cross. In 1917 she was posted from France to Italy as a temporary matron. In the New Years Honours in 1918 she was mentioned in despatches and awarded a first class Royal Red Cross.

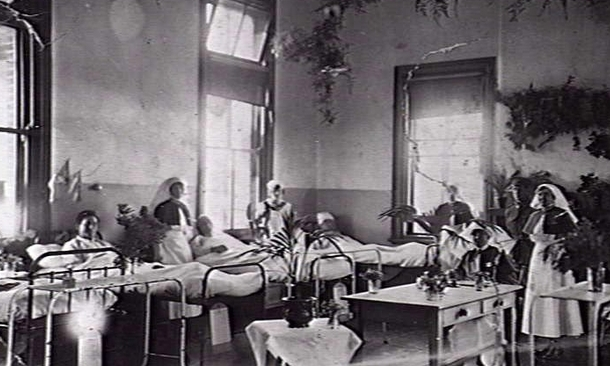
Keswick Military Hospital in 1920

On 3 June 1919 Sister Davidson was made a CBE in the King's Birthday Honours before she returned to Australia. From then until 1933 she was the matron of the military hospital at Keswick and in 1924 she became the Principal Matron for the area.

Davidson died in 1939 in Semaphore and she was buried in South Australia's West Terrace Cemetery.
