= West Terrace Cemetery =

Cemetery in Adelaide, South Australia

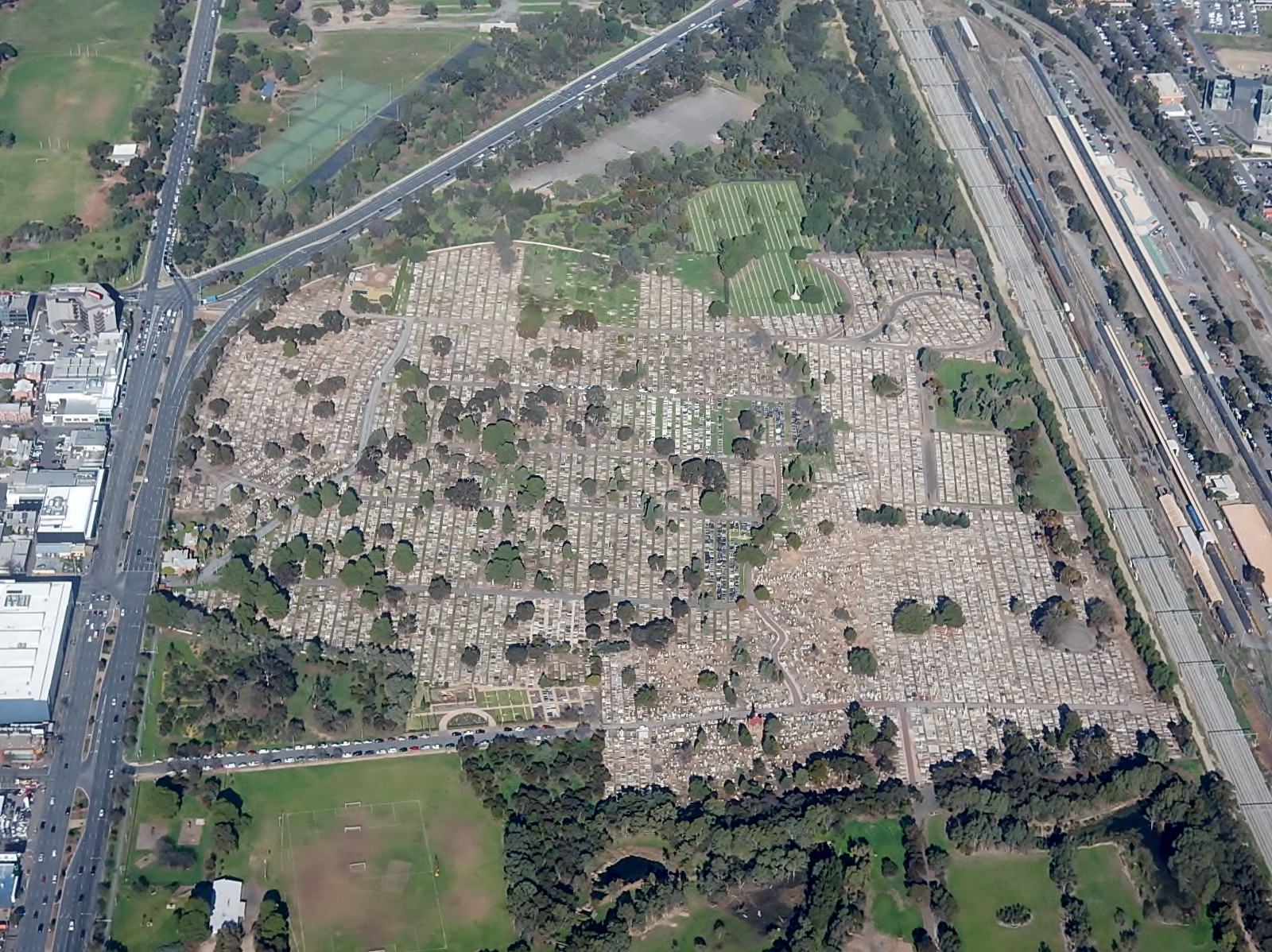
- Aerial view of the West Terrace Cemetery (also seen are Anzac Highway and West Terrace)
- Interactive map of West Terrace Cemetery

Details
- Established: before 1837
- Location: 161 West Terrace, Adelaide, South Australia, SA 5000
- Country: Australia
- Coordinates: 34°56′4″S 138°35′6″E
- Size: 27.6 hectares (68 acres)
- No. of interments: >150,000
- Website: aca.sa.gov.au/locations/west-terrace-cemetery/ (Adelaide Cemeteries Authority)
- Find a Grave: West Terrace Cemetery

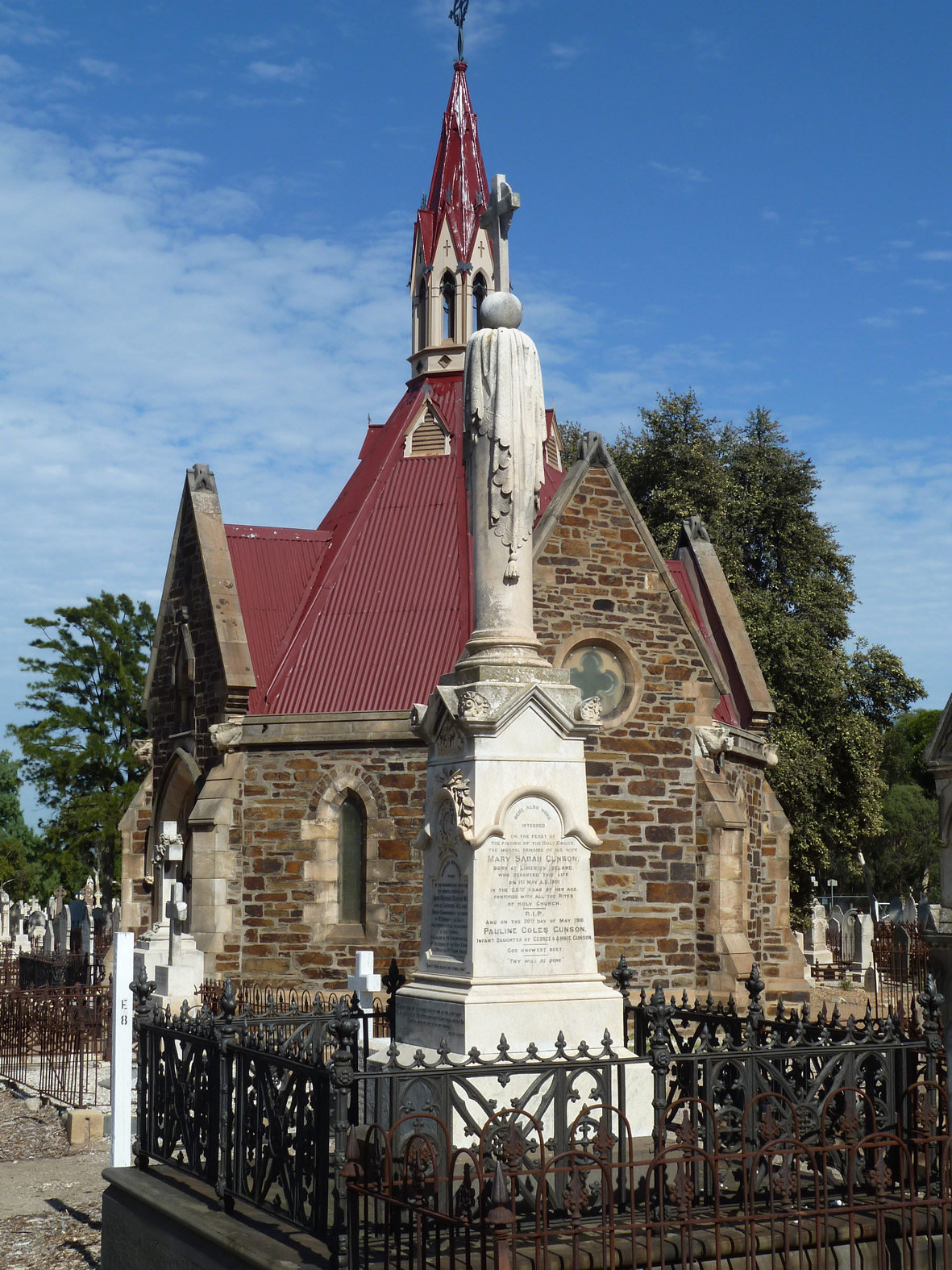
The Smyth Chapel in the Catholic section of the West Terrace Cemetery, built in 1871

The West Terrace Cemetery, formerly Adelaide Public Cemetery, is a cemetery in Adelaide, South Australia. It is the state's oldest cemetery, first appearing on Colonel William Light's 1837 plan of the Adelaide city centre, to the south-west of the city. The whole cemetery is state heritage-listed, including Smyth Chapel, and it is one of the oldest operating cemeteries in Australia.

== History ==
The Adelaide Park Lands were laid out by Colonel William Light in his design for the city in 1837. Originally, Light reserved 2,300 acres (930 ha) for a park, and a further 32 acres (13 ha) for a public cemetery.

The first official burial at the site was 30 year old James Laffan in July 1840, with the management committee beginning to sell leases the year prior. Although over 500 unofficial burials were held at the site prior to Laffan, of which there are no records.

The cemetery was quickly divided into lots by religious denomination, with a Jewish section created in 1843 at the request of a Mr Montefiore. In 1845, after the arrival of Bishop Francis Murphy, a Catholic section was formed with land outside the original site. This site would later subsume unused portions of the Jewish and Quaker sections, with the Church of England and Quakers receiving their own sections in 1849 and 1855 respectively. The Quakers would be the last denomination to receive their own section. Although "Afghan" (Muslim) and Druze areas of the general cemetery would be set aside in 1896 and 1928.

In 1902, the first crematorium in the southern hemisphere was built, and began operating in 1903. It was the only one in Australia for 20 years.

In 1989 the cemetery was listed on the South Australian Heritage Register.

The cemetery is home to around 60 olive trees which were planted in the 1860s. It is believed that the cemetery's first curator, Henry Brooks was responsible for their planting. It is believed that he worked with his friend, George William Francis, the first superintendent of the Adelaide Botanic Gardens in bringing them to the cemetery.

=== Desecration of Jewish section ===
In 1995, over 60 graves and headstones in the Jewish section of the cemetery were desecrated. Over 1, 000 people attended a "Service of Solidarity" at the cemetery to express solidarity with the Jewish community. Yehuda Avner, then Ambassador from Israel to Australia attended and read out a letter by Israeli Prime Minister, Yitzhak Rabin: "Given our history, our common heritage, our mutual faith, the desecration of the Adelaide Jewish Cemetery could not but touch a nerve in the emotions of us all... It revives painful associations.” A message was also read by Australian Prime Minister, Paul Keating, condemning the “mindless behaviour” that has “no place in a tolerant society.” Both the federal and Government of South Australia promised to cover the costs of restoring the damaged graves and headstones. Two men were charged in connection to the vandalism.

=== Smyth Chapel ===
The Smyth Chapel, located in the Catholic area of the cemetery, was designed by E. J. Woods in late 1870 as a result of a competition conducted by the Smyth Memorial Fund. It was built by Peters and Jones for approximately 472 pounds in 1871, as a memorial to the vicar general John Smyth, who is buried in the crypt beneath the chapel. The foundation stone was laid on 18 December 1870 by vicar general Archdeacon Russell, and formally consecrated on 22 October 1871.

In 2019 the Smyth Chapel underwent a large restoration, with project winning the Bob Such Award for Design for Social Benefit, a Civic Trust Award.

== Location and description ==
The 27.6-hectare (68-acre) site is located in Park 23 (aka G. S. Kingston Park / Wirrarninthi) of the Adelaide Park Lands, just south-west of the CBD, between West Terrace, Anzac Highway, Sir Donald Bradman Drive, and the Seaford and Belair railway lines.

It is divided into a number of sections for various communities and faiths, including two Catholic areas, as well as Jewish, Afghan, Islamic and Quaker sections.

== War graves ==
=== AIF Cemetery ===
With concerns from various patriotic associations about soldiers from the First World War without relatives being buried in unmarked graves in the cemetery, a deputation to the Minister of Public Works in February 1920 sought a "Soldiers Lot" not only for these soldiers but also those whose families wished to bury their "soldier loved ones" there. The minister set aside a half an acre of the Light Oval for this purpose, with a monument to be erected by public subscription and soldiers in unmarked graves to be re-interred there. The first burial was in March 1920 but with slow progress of public fund raising the area was not dedicated until Sunday 10 December 1922.

There are buried (at July 2025) 279 Commonwealth service personnel from both World Wars in West Terrace Cemetery whose graves are registered by the Commonwealth War Graves Commission.

== Notable interments or cremations ==
- William and Ann Margaret Bickford, manufacturing chemists
- Arthur Seaforth Blackburn, military officer and Victoria Cross recipient from the First World War
- Abraham Tobias Boas, long serving Rabbi of Adelaide's Jewish congregation
- James Bonnin, London property developer
- Poltpalingada Booboorowie (Tommy Walker), a Ngarrindjeri Aboriginal and popular Adelaide personality in the 1890s
- Charles Campbell, early settler, pastoralist and founder of Campbelltown
- Charles Chewings, geologist and anthropologist
- Sir Dominick Daly, 7th Governor of South Australia
- Phillip Davey, Victoria Cross recipient from the First World War
- Ethel Sarah Davidson, military nurse awarded Royal Red Cross and CBE
- J. Matthew Ennis, academic organist and pianist
- Boyle Travers Finniss, settler, soldier, surveyor and the first Premier of South Australia
- Thomas Gilbert, early pioneer and the colony's first Post Master General
- Percy Grainger, international musician and composer
- Bella Guerin, feminist, political activist, educator, and the first woman to graduate from an Australian university
- Frederick Holder, first Speaker of the Australian House of Representatives
- Charles Beaumont Howard, South Australia's first colonial chaplain
- Reginald Roy Inwood, Victoria Cross recipient from the First World War
- Jorgen Christian Jensen, Danish-born Victoria Cross recipient from the First World War
- Sr Dr Deirdre Jordan RSM AC MBE (1926–2026), Australian university chancellor and Catholic nun
- Charles Kingston, 20th Premier of South Australia and a founding member of the Australian House of Representatives
- Carl Linger, musician and composer of Song of Australia
- Philip Levi, early settler and pastoralist
- John McPherson, first leader of the South Australian division of the Australian Labor Party
- Frederick Metters, founder of oven and stove manufacturing business that became Metters Limited
- Sir John Morphett (along with other members of his family), early settler, pastoralist and businessman
- Vaiben Louis Solomon, 21st Premier of South Australia and a founding member of the Australian House of Representatives.
- Augusta Zadow, suffragette and trade unionist
- The unidentified person called The Somerton Man

== Gallery ==
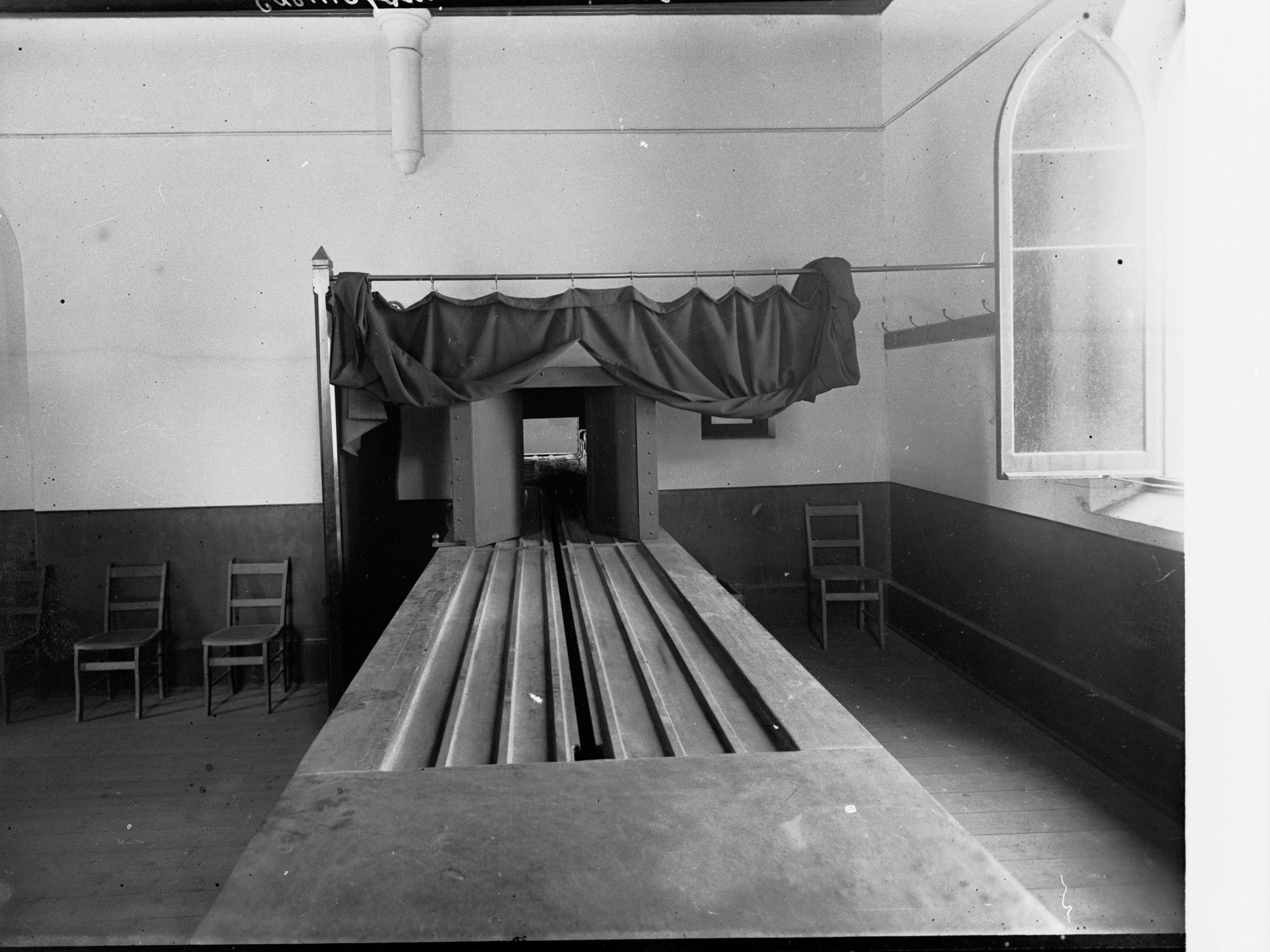
Crematorium on West Terrace, inside room looking into crematorium, 1919

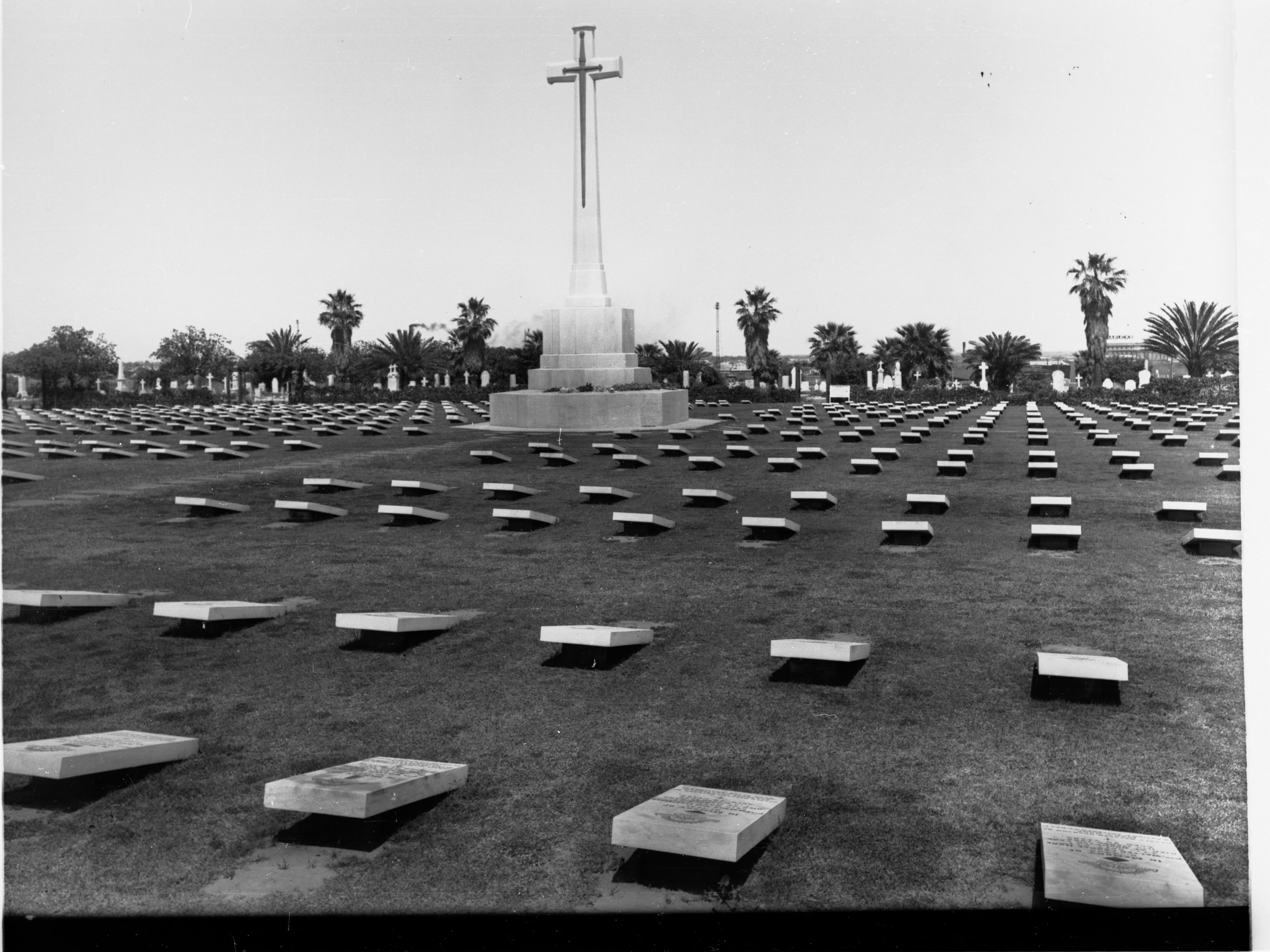
Soldiers Cemetery on West Terrace, 1937

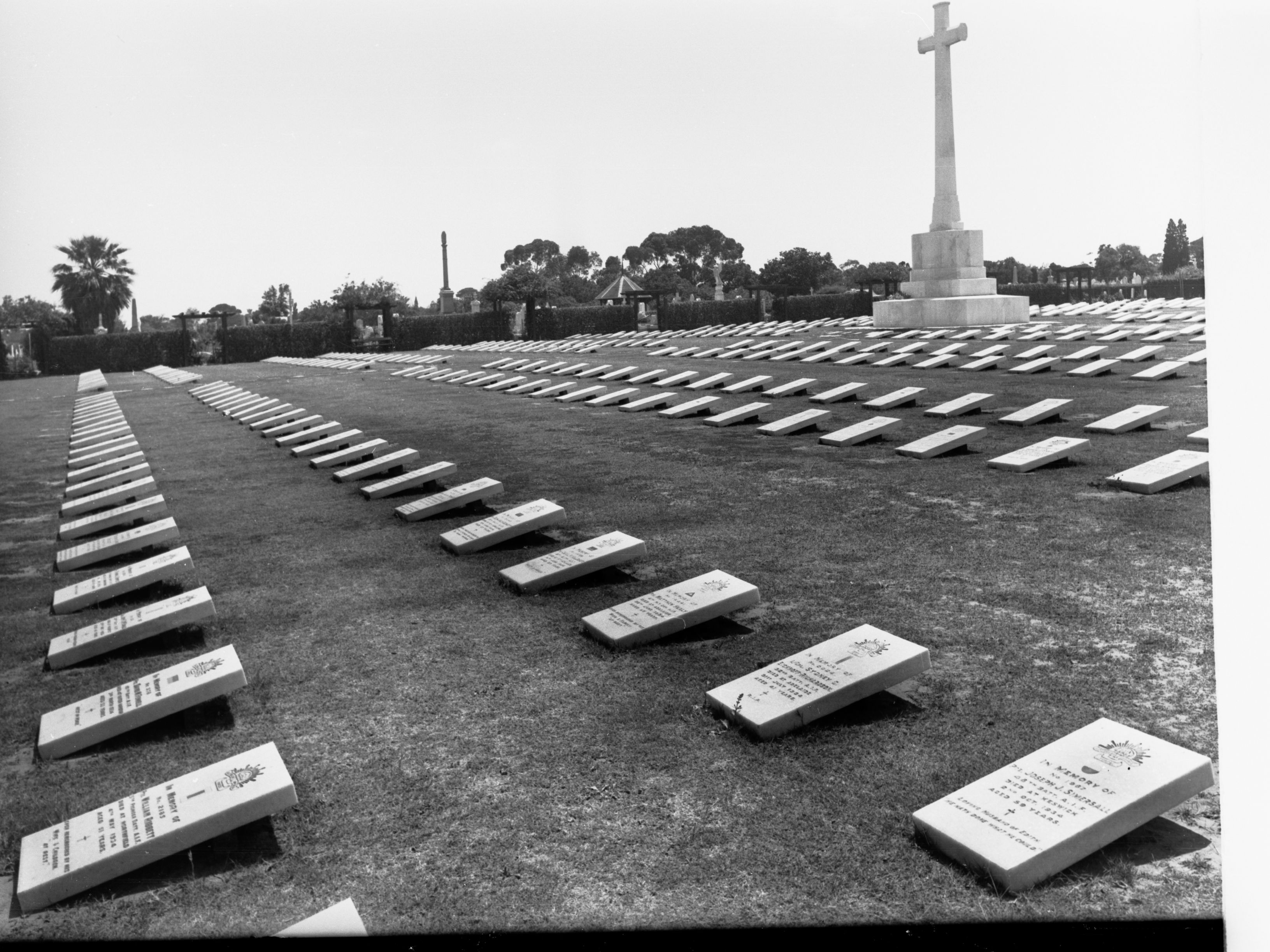
Soldiers Cemetery on West Terrace, 1937

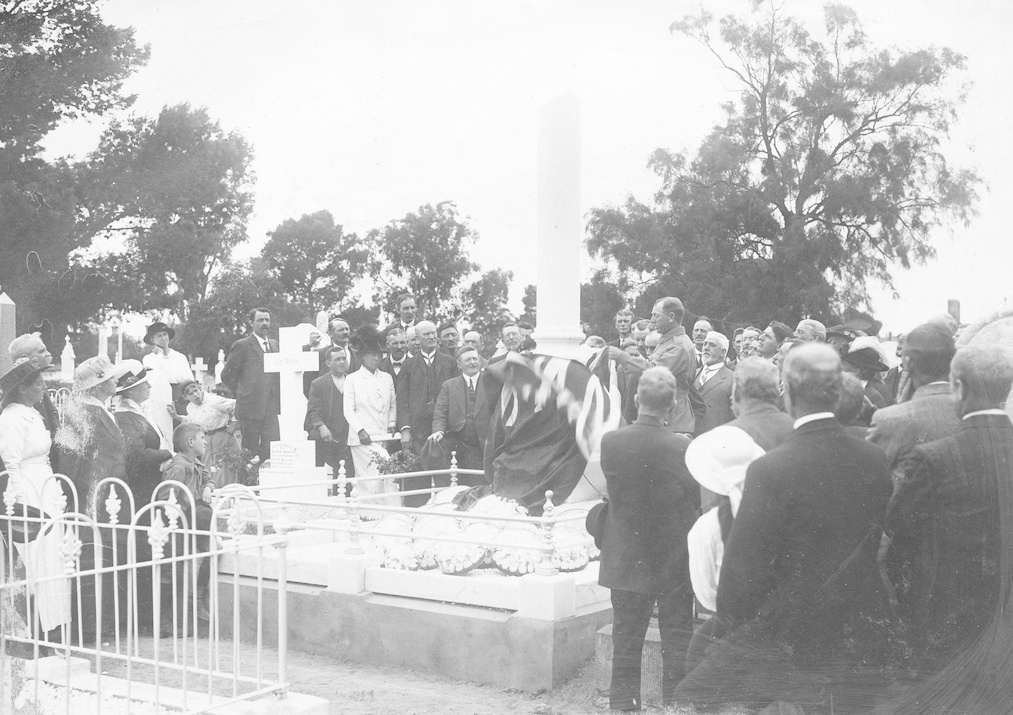
Unveiling of a memorial to South Australian politician Ernest Arthur Roberts at West Terrace Cemetery, Adelaide, 13 January 1917.

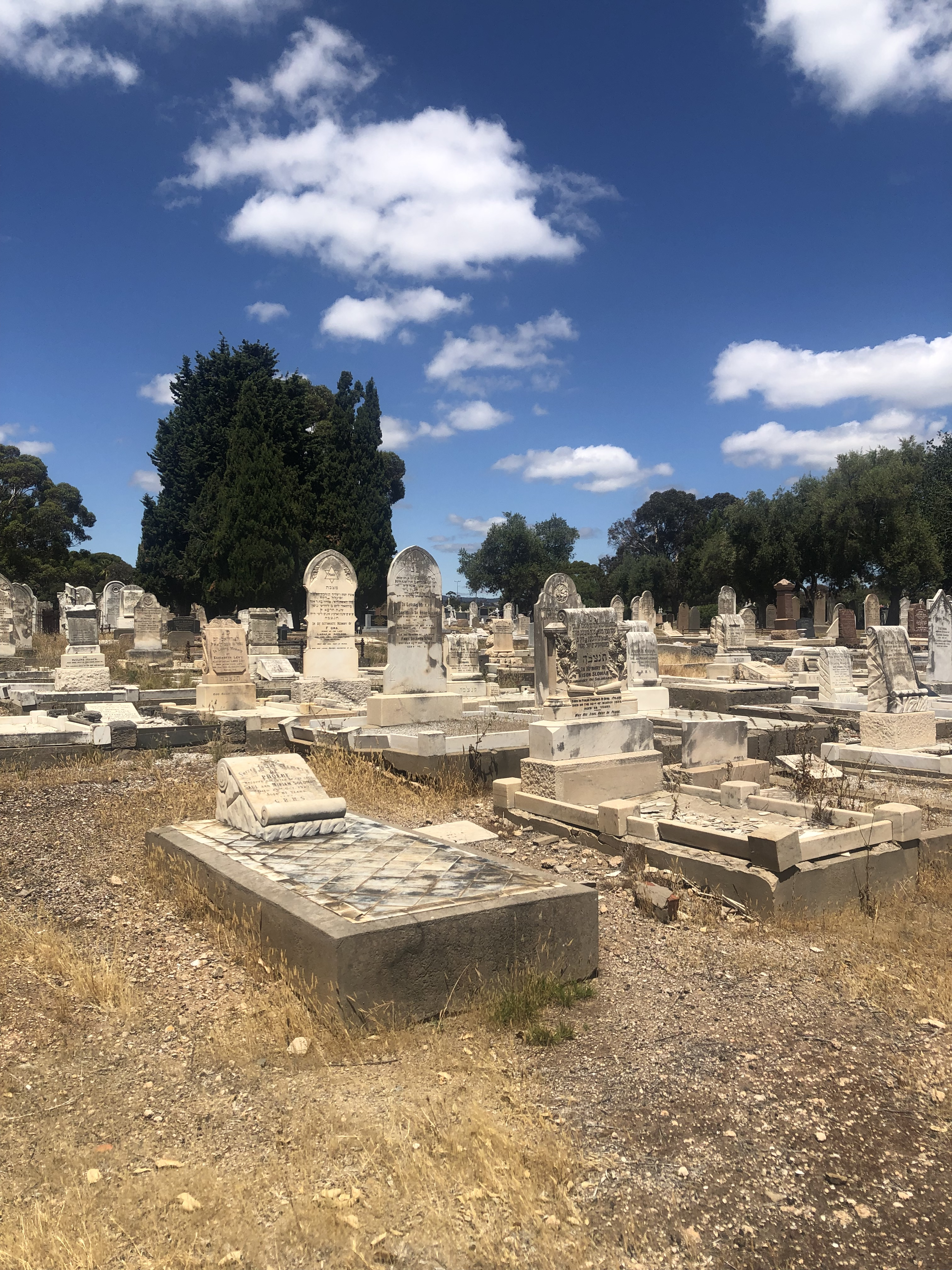
Jewish section of West Terrace Cemetery, Adelaide, 2024

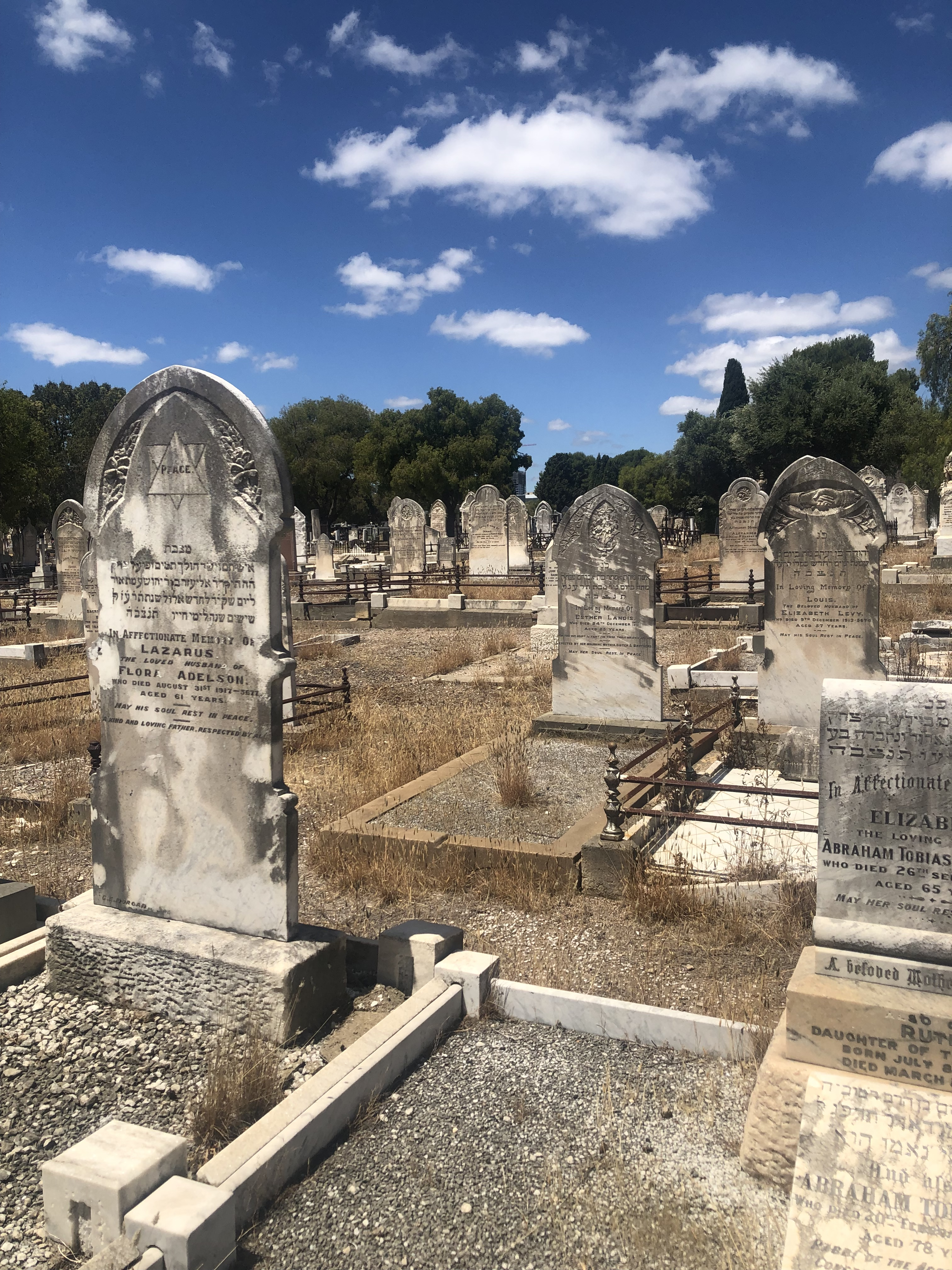
Jewish section of West Terrace Cemetery, Adelaide, 2024
