= Charles Blackburn =

Australian university chancellor and physician

Charles Blackburn KCMG OBE

Chancellor of the University of Sydney
- In office 1941–1964

Personal details
- Born: Charles Bickerton Blackburn; 22 April 1874 Greenhithe, Kent, England
- Died: 20 July 1972 (aged 98) Bellevue Hill, New South Wales, Australia
- Education: University of Sydney, University of Adelaide
- Occupation: Physician, chancellor

Lieutenant-Colonel Sir Charles Bickerton Blackburn KCMG OBE (22 April 1874 – 20 July 1972) was an Australian university chancellor and physician. Blackburn was born in Greenhithe, Kent, England, to the cleric and entomologist Thomas Blackburn and his wife Jessie Ann, née Wood. Mainly known as a long-serving chancellor (1941–1964) and member of the Senate of the University of Sydney, serving on the University Senate from 1919 to 1964. He was Dean of the Faculty of Medicine 1932–1935. He was also a councillor of the Australian Medical Association and the Association of Physicians of Australasia.

Blackburn served in World War I as a lieutenant-colonel for the Australian Army Medical Corps. He was appointed an OBE for his services towards the Medical Corps, and became the chair of the Commonwealth Royal Commission on the assessment of war service disabilities, in 1924. In World War II, Blackburn served in the 113 Australian General Hospital, in Concord.

Blackburn graduated from the University of Adelaide (B.A. 1893) and went on to study medicine, transferring to the University of Sydney in 1896 – M.B. B.S.; Ch.M., 1899; M.D., 1903. He began his medical career at the Royal Prince Alfred Hospital in Sydney, Australia. He set up his own private practice in 1903, but he still remained connected with the hospital.

His son was also called Charles (Charles Ruthven Bickerton Blackburn AC), was similarly a Lieutenant-Colonel for the Australian Army Medical Corps (World War II), and was similarly associated with the University of Sydney, becoming the Bosch Professor and Head of the Department of Medicine in 1957.

Blackburn died in 1972 in the Sydney suburb of Bellevue Hill, at the age of 98.
