= HMAT Ascanius =

Passenger ship and troopship

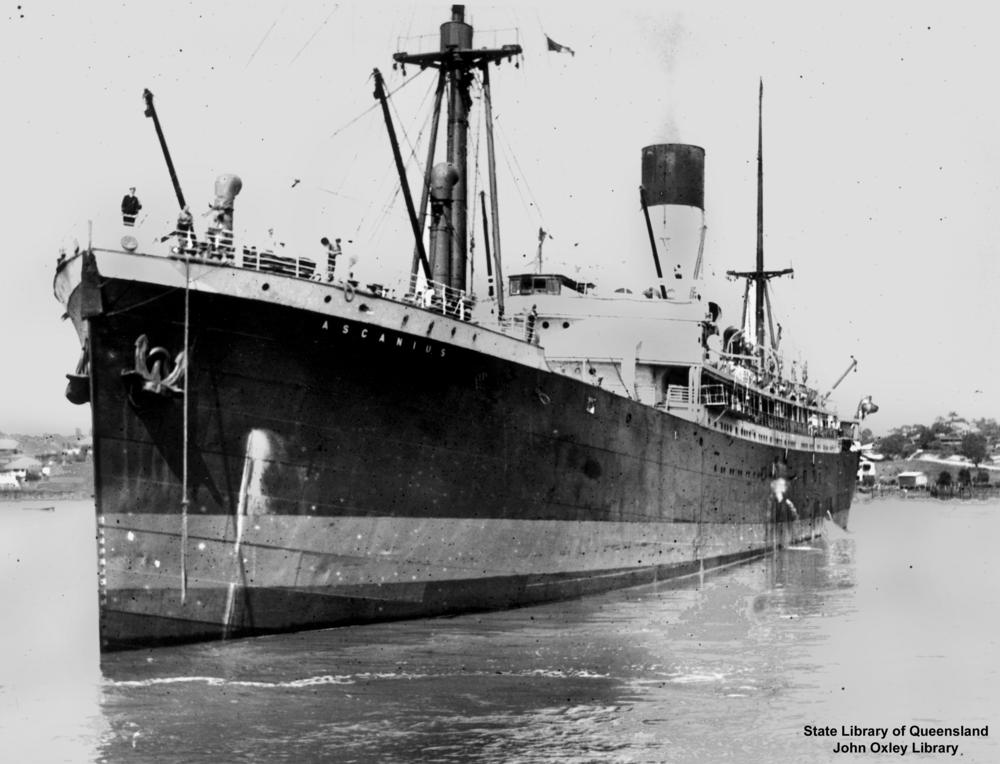
- Ascanius in 1936

History
- Name: Ascanius (1910–1949); San Giovannino (1949–1952)
- Owner: Ocean Steamship Company (1912–1921); Cia de Nav. Florencia (1949–1952)
- Builder: Workman, Clark and Company, Belfast
- Yard number: 295
- Launched: 29 October 1910
- In service: 30 December 1910
- Out of service: 1952

Australia
- Name: Ascanius
- Operator: Australian Army
- In service: 1914
- Out of service: 1920
- Fate: Returned to owners in 1920

General characteristics
- Tonnage: 10,048 gross register tons
- Length: 150.3 m (493 ft)
- Beam: 18.4 m (60 ft)
- Draught: 11.3 m (37 ft)
- Installed power: 641 hp
- Propulsion: Triple expansion steam engine
- Speed: 26 knots (48 km/h; 30 mph) maximum

SS Ascanius was a steamship built in 1910 for the Ocean Steamship Company to be operated in the Blue Funnel Line. The ship operated from Britain to Australia until 1914 when she was converted into the troop transporter HMAT Ascanius (Note: HMAT is a ship prefix that stands for His Majesty's Australian Transport) for the Australian Expeditionary Force with the tactical identifier A11. Ascanius was returned to her owners after the war and resumed her regular passenger service from Glasgow via Liverpool to Brisbane.

In 1940 Ascanius was again requisitioned as a troop transporter. On 30 July 1944 she was torpedoed in the English Channel by German submarine U-621, but was able to reach Liverpool on her own and was repaired. In 1945, the ship was used to transport displaced persons from Marseille to Haifa. In 1949 Ascanius was sold to Cia. de Nav. 'Florencia' of Genoa and renamed San Giovannino. She was to be used for emigrant traffic from Italy to Australia, but this did not happen and she was scrapped in 1952.
