= Frank Fujita =

United States Army soldier (1921–1996)

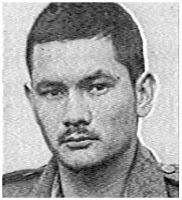
- Frank Fujita as a sergeant
- Born: October 20, 1921; Lawton, Oklahoma
- Died: December 11, 1996 (aged 75); Abilene, Texas
- Burial place: Elmwood Memorial Park
- Military career
- Allegiance: United States of America
- Branch: United States Army
- Rank: Sergeant
- Nickname: Foo
- Conflicts: Second World War: Battle of Java (1942)
- Other work: Author

Frank Fujita (October 20, 1921 – December 11, 1996) was a Japanese American soldier of the US Army who, during his service in World War II became one of only two Japanese American combat personnel (the other being Richard Sakakida) to be captured by the Japanese. Part of the 2nd Battalion, 131st Field Artillery of the 36th Infantry Division (which was later known as the "Lost Battalion"), Texas National Guard, he was captured during the Battle of Java when the Dutch surrendered.

A prisoner held in Japan for three and a half years, Fujita later published a memoir of his experience, Foo: A Japanese-American Prisoner of the Rising Sun. His work, along with those of John David Provoo and W. F. Matthews, fellow "Lost Battalion" prisoners of war, has served as a useful historical reference for the experience of American prisoners of war held in Japan.

== Biography ==
=== Early years ===
Fujita's father was born in a village near Nagasaki, Japan, and after learning English while at school he was sent to the United States to learn American methods of agriculture. Arriving in June 1914, he took a Western name and became embroiled in gambling in Los Angeles. He worked for the Salvation Army before training as a chef on the Rock Island Rail Road. He met his future wife, Isa Pearl Elliott, at a hotel in Rock Island, Illinois, and the two were married in 1919.

Fujita was the second of five children, born on October 20, 1921, in Lawton while his father worked in the food industry in Oklahoma, enhancing his income further with gambling wins and moonlighting in artistry and sign painting. Fujita and his siblings were encouraged to absorb the culture of the United States and become "one hundred percent American". Fujita joined the American Boy Scouts upon moving to El Reno, and survived well under his father's healthy income during the Great Depression. It was at this time that he earned the nickname "Foo", based on a childhood pet. His drawings of this cat attracted local media interest from The Abilene Reporter News in 1937, a local newspaper from Abilene, Texas. He obtained work as a cartoonist for a local school newspaper and as a stage hand in various theatre plays.

=== Enlistment ===
Fujita became interested in joining the military after hearing of his friend's enjoyment of the Texas National Guard. He enlisted after a lengthy debate between the National Guard and the civics teacher of the local high school debating the legitimacy of his claim to American citizenship, as well as questions over his weight, height and age, all three of which were below the minimum level. Made a PFC and a chauffeur for the battalion officers, Fujita progressed well in the National Guard though struggled at home with his studies. After accepting an ultimatum from his father to work harder or leave, Fujita chose to hitch-hike to Oklahoma and became an artist and illustrator. On the outbreak of war in 1939, he returned to his National Guard unit, taking part in training manoeuvres through 1940.

November 10, 1941. We are leaving Camp Bowie. The Battalion is going to "Frisco" on two trains. I am in the first train that the others will follow in the morning. It was sure hard to say good-bye to Charlie, Ed, Joe and the rest. We got underway at 10:00 PM.

— Fujita's diary entry during the activation of his National Guard Unit.

Come November, with Fujita by now a sergeant, the unit was mobilized and sent to San Francisco and then Louisiana. In 1941, he was shipped overseas aboard the Republic.

=== Battle of Java ===
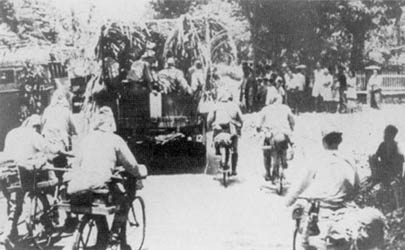
Japanese bicycle infantry moving through Java.

==== Japanese landings ====
During the Battle of the Java Sea on 27 February 1942, the Allied navies suffered a disastrous defeat at the hand of the Imperial Japanese Navy. The American-British-Dutch-Australian Command (ABDA) Strike Force commander—Admiral Karel Doorman—was killed. What followed was several landings on the island of Java on March 1. The Allied forces were commanded by the Royal Netherlands East Indies Army (KNIL) commander, General Hein ter Poorten. Although the KNIL forces had, on paper, 25,000 (mostly Indonesian) well-armed troops, many were poorly trained. The Japanese troops landed at three points on Java on 1 March. The West Java invasion convoy landed on Bantam Bay near Merak and Eretan Wetan, having defeated HMAS Perth and USS Houston at the Battle of Sunda Strait, a few hours prior to landing. The East Java invasion convoy landed on Kragan.

==== Land campaign ====
Japanese troops, mainly from the 48th Division, landed at three points on Java on March 1.

The Dutch and other Allied forces were organized in four sub-commands: Batavia (Jakarta); North Central Java; South Java and East Java.

As the only US ground forces in Java, the main body of the 2nd Battalion, 131st Field Artillery was attached to an Australian Army formation named Blackforce after its commander, Brigadier Arthur Blackburn. The Australians lacked infantry units, but included a heavy machine gun battalion, a pioneer battalion, several smaller units, some reinforcements diverted en route to Singapore after the Allied surrender there, a handful of Australian soldiers who had escaped from Singapore, two transport companies, and a casualty clearing station. From these units, Blackburn organized three makeshift infantry battalions.

However, "E" Battery, 2/131st Field Artillery, including Frank Fujita, were attached to Dutch infantry in Central and East Java.

On March 2, at Leuwiliang, 15 miles (24 km) west of Buitenzorg, "D" Battery, 2/131st Field Artillery, supported the makeshift Australian infantry, positioned along a riverbank. The Allies put up a vigorous defence. Volleys from "D" Battery reportedly destroyed many Japanese tanks and trucks. Blackforce managed to hold up the Japanese advance for two full days before being forced to withdraw to Soekabumi, lest it become trapped by Japanese flanking manoeuvres, and was ordered to retreat to Soekabumi.

The Japanese quickly overwhelmed the Allied defences in most other areas. However, at Porong, near Surabaya, the Texans of "E" Battery, including Frank Fujita, supported the Dutch 8th and 13th Infantry Battalions, as well as the Dutch 3rd Cavalry Unit, in giving fierce resistance to the incoming Japanese.

==== Allied surrender ====
By 7 March, defeat was inevitable, with Tjilatjap already in Japanese hands. Soerabaja was being evacuated while Japanese troops were rapidly converging on Bandoeng from both the north and the west. At 09:00 on 8 March, the Commander-in-Chief of the Allied forces — Ter Poorten — announced the surrender of the Royal Netherlands East Indies Army in Java. At 23:00, the Dutch radio station NIROM (Nederlandsch Indische Radio Omroep Maatschappij) broadcast the last news from a temporary transmitter at Ciumbuleuit. The announcer Bert Garthoff ended the broadcast with the words "Wij sluiten nu. Vaarwel tot betere tijden. Leve de Koningin!" (We are closing now. Farewell till better times. Long live the Queen!) The Dutch Governor, Jonkheer Dr. A.W.L. Tjarda Van Starkenborgh Stachouwer and Lieutenant-General Ter Poorten, together with Major-General Jacob J. Pesman, the commander of the Bandoeng District, met the Japanese Commander-in-Chief, Lieutenant-General Hitoshi Imamura at Kalidjati that afternoon and agreed to the capitulation of all the troops. Fujita was captured along 550 other members of what became known as the "Lost Battalion".

=== Internment ===
Fujita was a prisoner of war for three and a half years. He spent the majority of his internment in Omori Prison Island in Tokyo Bay, but was also imprisoned in Surabaja and Changi Prison in Singapore after initial capture. He was for a time in the company of fellow prisoner John David Provoo.

Due to his ethnicity, Fujita was separated from other American prisoners and forced to produce propaganda broadcasts for the Japanese.

=== Liberation ===
On August 29, 1945, Fujita and 300 other survivors from his battalion were among the first American prisoners to be liberated.

These are the first free Americans that I have seen in almost four years. I am so grateful not to have drowned for my own foolishness that I cannot even cry. They are indeed the toughest men I have ever seen... I am fully aware that I have not drowned. My final foolishness has not killed me. I am alive! I am free!

— Fujita on his liberation.

Like most of his fellow inmates, Fujita was returned to the United States over a period of several weeks in late 1945. Fujita travelled via train to Texas, and via bus to Abilene, arriving in October. He recorded later that "I walked past my mother and baby sister without recognizing them. My mom must have been drowsy, or the sight of me froze her to immobility, for I was two or three people past her before she came into action."
