= 2/3rd Machine Gun Battalion =

Former battalion of the Australian Army

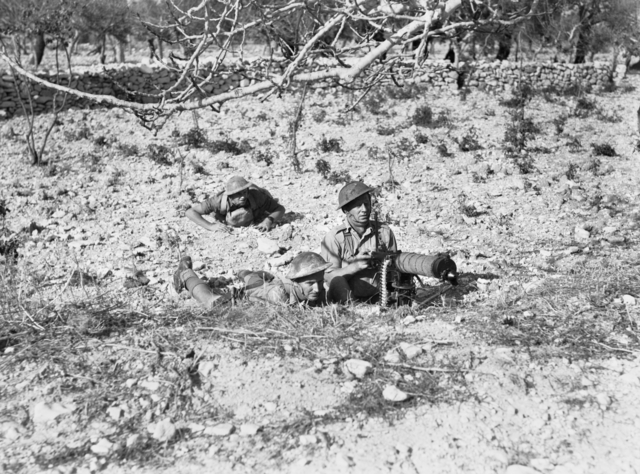
- A Vickers machine gun team from the 2/3rd Machine Gun Battalion in Syria, October 1941
- Active: 1940–1946
- Country: Australia
- Branch: Australian Army
- Type: Infantry
- Role: Direct fire support
- Size: ~800–900 personnel
- Part of: 7th Division; 6th Division
- Engagements: World War II: Syria–Lebanon campaign; Battle of Java; Aitape–Wewak campaign

Commanders
- Notable commanders: Arthur Blackburn

Insignia
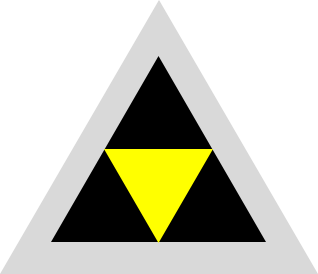
- Unit colour patch

The 2/3rd Machine Gun Battalion was formed in June 1940 as part of the 7th Division and served in Egypt, Syria, the Netherlands East Indies and New Guinea during World War II. Under the command of Lieutenant Colonel Arthur Blackburn when it was raised, the battalion was primarily a South Australian unit, although it had sub-units formed in Victoria, Tasmania and Western Australia. After completing training in Australia, in April 1941 the battalion embarked for the Middle East. In June/July 1941 it saw action against Vichy French forces during the Syria–Lebanon campaign, during which time the battalion was heavily involved in supporting various elements of the 7th Division.

Following Japan's entry into the war, the decision was made to transfer a large number of Australian troops from the Middle East to the Pacific region. In early 1942, as the Japanese advanced through the Netherlands East Indies, the majority of the battalion was captured during the Battle of Java. A small number of the battalion's personnel returned to Australia and it was subsequently re-raised in mid-1942. It was later attached to the 6th Division as a corps unit and served in Papua New Guinea during the Aitape–Wewak campaign in 1944–1945. The battalion was disbanded in January 1946.

== History ==
=== Formation and training ===
The 2/3rd Machine Gun Battalion (Note: The numerical designation of 2nd AIF units was prefixed by "2/", which was used to set them apart from Militia units or units of the First Australian Imperial Force, which did not use a prefix.) was one of four machine gun battalions that were raised as part of the all-volunteer Second Australian Imperial Force (2nd AIF) for service overseas during World War II. Motorised infantry units, equipped with wheeled motor vehicles, motorcycles and sometimes tracked carriers, the machine gun battalions were formed to provide a greater level of support by fire than that which was organically available within ordinary infantry battalions. At its peak, the 2/3rd was equipped with 124 motor vehicles of various descriptions and 50 motorcycles.

Developed by the British Army, the concept within the Australian Army had its genesis during the Gallipoli Campaign in 1915, when the machine guns assigned to the infantry battalions – initially two and then, later, four – had been grouped together and co-ordinated at brigade level to help compensate for the lack of artillery support. Over the course of the war, on the Western Front the concept had evolved through the establishment of machine gun companies in 1916 and machine gun battalions in 1918. Similar formations had also been established amongst the Australian Light Horse units serving in the Sinai and Palestine Campaign. During the inter-war years, the machine gun battalions had been deemed unnecessary. When the Army was reorganised in 1921, they were not re-raised, but in 1937, as the Army looked to expand as fears of war in Europe loomed, four such units were raised within the part-time Militia, by converting light horse units and motorising them. When World War II broke out, the decision was made to raise several machine gun battalions within the 2nd AIF, allocated at a rate of one per division.

The 2/3rd Machine Gun Battalion was formed on 17 June 1940, in Wayville, South Australia. Upon formation, the battalion was commanded by Lieutenant Colonel Arthur Blackburn, a World War I veteran who had received the Victoria Cross for actions at Pozieres. Designated a South Australian battalion, its personnel were nevertheless recruited from several Australian states: South Australians predominated, but there were also men from Victoria, Tasmania, and Western Australia, with many of the battalion's cadre staff of officers and senior non commissioned officers having served previously in the Militia with various light horse regiments and infantry battalions. In common with the other Australian machine gun battalions, the colours chosen for the battalion's unit colour patch (UCP) were black and gold. These were presented in a triangular shape with a border of grey.

Initially, the battalion was stretched across several locations, with companies being formed in Seymour, Victoria, Brighton, Tasmania, and Northam, Western Australia. The Tasmanians and Western Australians had initially been intended to join the 2/2nd Machine Gun Battalion, and during its formative period, the companies completed basic training in their home locations, before concentrating together at Warradale, South Australia with the Tasmanians sailing to Melbourne to link up with Victorians prior to entraining for the journey west, while the Western Australians crossed the Nullarbor Plain. At this point, the unit's establishment was completed, as the battalion structure was finalised. It was structured along the same lines as the other 2nd AIF machine gun battalions, which consisted of between 800 and 900 personnel organised into a headquarters element consisting of three platoons – signals, anti-aircraft and administration – and four machine gun companies, each equipped with 12 Vickers machine guns, to make a total of 48 across the entire battalion. Within the machine gun companies there were three platoons; these were numbered sequentially starting from 1 to 3 in Headquarters Company through to 13 to 15 in 'D' Company. A Light Aid Detachment of electrical and mechanical engineers was also attached.

=== Fighting against the Vichy French: Palestine and Syria ===
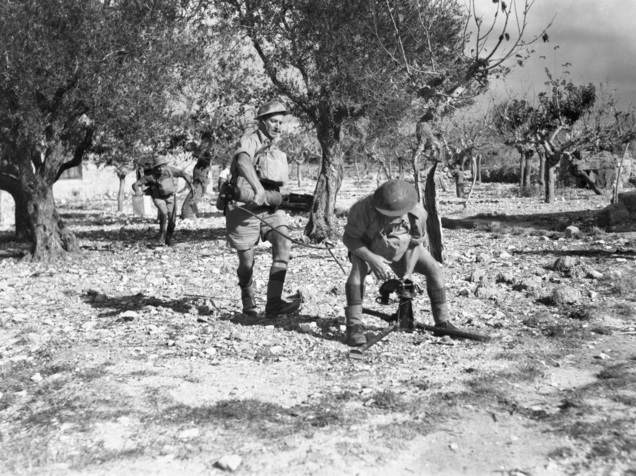
2/3rd Machine Gun Battalion personnel set up a Vickers machine gun during an exercise in Syria, October 1941

In early April 1941, the battalion, less 'D' Company which travelled west for home leave, entrained at Oakbank, near to Woodside, South Australia where they had moved the previous February. From there, the battalion travelled overland to Sydney where they embarked upon the SS Ile de France from Pyrmont Wharf, bound for the Middle East, as part of a large convoy of troopships. Sailing via Fremantle where 'D' Company rejoined the battalion, they sailed on to Colombo, which was reached in late April, where the troopship put in for repairs and shore leave was given to all battalion personnel. Departing again in early May, they continued on alone, crossing the Red Sea in a week and making landfall at Port Tewfik. The troops had to endure a two-day wait before disembarkation whereupon they were taken to the eastern side of the Suez Canal by lighter and then transferred by train to Kantara.

Upon arrival in the Middle East, the 2/3rd was assigned to the 7th Division, the 2nd AIF's second division and subsequently joined them in Palestine, establishing a camp at Hill 95, to the north of Gaza. There the battalion undertook a vigorous physical training regime to regain the fitness lost from the sea voyage. The final elements of unit identity were issued at the time: pugarees and colour patches. It also finally began to receive its vehicles and heavy equipment, including its Vickers machine guns as preparations were made for the battalion to join the fighting in the Western Desert.

In the end, this did not eventuate, as the 7th Division was committed to the Syria–Lebanon campaign in early June, to secure the Allied eastern flank from attack. Due to the presence of Vichy French troops, the campaign was politically sensitive and as a result of heavy censorship not widely reported in Australia at the time; the nature of the fighting, where it was reported, was also downplayed with the Vichy Forces outnumbering the Allies and also being better equipped. For the 2/3rd, the campaign saw them heavily involved throughout the short, but sharply contested campaign, with each of the four machine gun companies supporting separate efforts by elements of the 7th Division and also British troops, seeing action around Merdajayoun, Metula, Quneitra, Sidon and Damour before the Vichy French requested an armistice in mid-July. The 2/3rd's casualties during the campaign amounted to one officer and 41 other ranks killed or wounded. In the aftermath of the campaign, the 2/3rd stayed on as part of the Allied occupation force established in Syria and Lebanon to defend against a possible drive south by Axis forces through the Caucasus. The battalion defended a position north-east of Beirut, around Bikfaya, initially but was moved around to various locations including Aleppo, on the Turkish border, throughout the remainder of 1941. They endured a bitter cold, and snowy, winter at Fih near Tripoli, which was punctuated by leave drafts to Tel Aviv.

=== Into action against the Japanese: Java and captivity ===
In late 1941, the Japanese entered the war, attacking Pearl Harbor and launching an invasion of Malaya. Faced with a threat closer to home, the Australian government pressed for the return of its troops from the Middle East, and so in early 1942 the 7th Division began withdrawing from their garrison posts in Syria and Lebanon. The 2/3rd left the village of Fih and moved to a camp at Hill 69, in Palestine, on 14 January 1942. They remained there until 31 January when they boarded a train which took them to Kantara where they were ferried across the canal to continue the journey to Port Tewfik where the majority of the battalion, totalling 636 personnel of all ranks, boarded the troopship Orcades. Men who were in the hospital or on course were subsequently reposted to the 2/2nd Machine Gun Battalion, and remained in the Middle East, later seeing action at El Alamein. Others who did not board the Orcades included the battalion's 'B' Echelon, essentially all its vehicles, baggage and heavy weapons, and its maintenance personnel. These embarked on eight smaller vessels: the Silver Willow, Penrith Castle, Shillong, Tarifa, Sophecles, Nigerstroom, Industria and Tricolor. These ships were to follow the Orcades up at its eventual destination, which was at the time, still being kept secret even to the troops on board.

The Orcades, a fast transport capable of 26 knots, set sail for Colombo before even the battalion's baggage could be brought on board. On 8 February 1942, the ship reached its intermediate destination from where it was escorted by the cruiser HMS Dorsetshire. As the situation in the Pacific worsened for the Allies – Singapore had fallen in early February and the Japanese were steadily advancing through the Netherlands East Indies – the Allies made the decision to hastily make a stand. The Orcades reached Oosthaven, in Sumatra, on 15 February, and the troops from Orcades were ferried ashore on the tanker Van Spillsbergen, where they were grouped together as "Boost Force" under orders to take up the defence of the Palembang airfields and providing protection to civilians as they were evacuated. Missing many of their weapons, the troops were re-equipped with rifles from the Orcades's armoury. However, shortly after their arrival, they were ordered to re-embark on the tanker, which eventually caught up with Orcades and transferred its personnel for the remainder of the journey to Batavia. There, fresh orders reached them. The units aboard the Orcades (the 2/2nd Pioneers, an engineer field company, an anti-aircraft regiment as well as transport and medical personnel) were ordered to form an ad hoc force along with a squadron from the British 3rd The King's Own Hussars and an artillery battery from the US 131st Field Artillery Regiment. This force, under Blackburn who was promoted to brigadier, came to be known as "Blackforce", with headquarters being established at Batavia. In Blackburn's stead, the 'D' Company commander, Major Edward Lyneham, was promoted to take over command of the battalion.

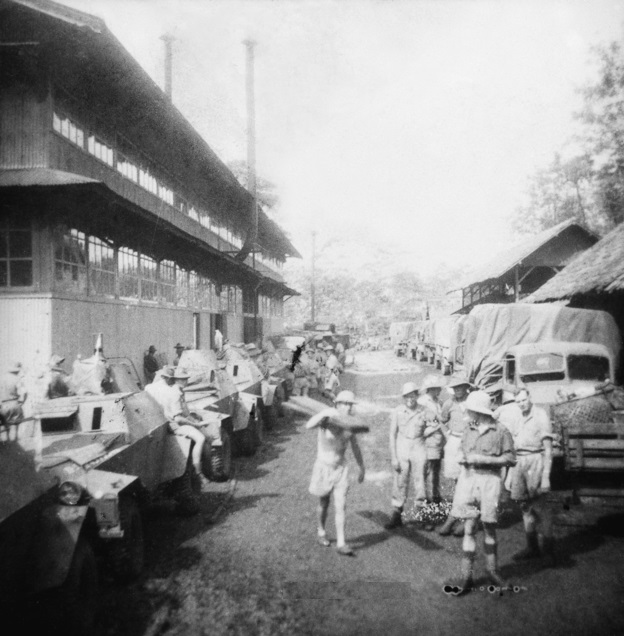
2/3rd Machine Gun Battalion personnel at Arinem Plantation, Java

Blackburn established his force into a brigade formation, utilising the pioneers and machine gunners as infantry battalions, and forming a third infantry battalion from troops that were assigned to garrison the base, as well as logistics and administrative personnel, and members of the AIF who had been able to get out of Singapore before it fell. Due to the presence of a large amount of equipment on the wharf, which had been intended to be sent to Singapore before its fall, Blackforce was able to re-equip itself handsomely with vehicles including carriers and armoured cars, Bren guns, Thompson sub-machine guns and mortars; but there were no machine guns. Concentrating around the civilian airport at Kemajoian, the battalion formed part of Blackforce's defensive garrison, tasked with protecting Batavia's five airfields from Japanese paratroopers; 'B' Company was detached in this time to defend the Buitenzorg military airfield. Shortly afterwards, they came under air attack from Japanese Mitsubishi A6M Zeroes on 22 February, during which one member of the 2/3rd was killed, while six others were wounded. Two of these wounded were later smuggled out of the Indies by medical personnel back to Australia, with one rejoining the battalion there later in the year. As the Japanese began advancing further in the Indies, Blackburn sought to re-orient his troops, and the machine gunners were subsequently moved to the Leuwiliang area, 15 miles (24 km) west of Buitenzorg along an expected main avenue of advance, and they were given the task for defence the bridge over the Tjianten River.

Following the Battle of the Java Sea, the Japanese were able to land a force around Banten Bay and Marek, on the western tip of Java, and subsequently began advancing east towards Batavia and Buitenzorg, forcing Blackforce to reorientate itself east of the Tjianten River, to make a stand south of Buitenzorg. On 3 March, the battalion went into action around Leuwiliang for the first time as Dutch troops began to withdraw. Occupying positions in support of the 2/2nd Pioneers who held the bridge over the Tjianten River, they were alerted to the advancing Japanese by the presence of fifth columnists, who were seen to be laying out marking panels. A short time later, a force of five Japanese light tanks attempted to cross the river, but were rebuffed by anti-tank rifles and small arms. The plan had been for the Dutch troops to make a stand at Djasinga, but faulty intelligence resulted in a rout and the Dutch began to withdraw back to Bandung, flooding through Blackforce's lines. In the ensuing chaos, Dutch engineers blew up the bridge at the Tjianten River. For the next couple of days, the battalion fought several skirmishes with 'C' Company bearing the brunt of the Japanese attacks, suffering seven killed and 28 wounded, while inflicting about 200 casualties on the Japanese. As the Allied defence of the island began to collapse, the machine gunners were ordered to hold up the Japanese around Leuwiliang for a day. After this, Blackforce began moving towards Soekaboemi on 5 March, as part of efforts to reach Tjilatjap on the southern coast of the island to secure passage back to Australia. Ultimately, this never eventuated and Blackforce was ordered to surrender on 9 March 1942 following the Dutch capitulation the day before. They would subsequently endure three-and-a-half years in captivity as Japanese prisoners of war, being sent to camps across south-east Asia, including the infamous Thai–Burma Railway. Forced to endure brutal conditions, over worked in labour camps, and inadequately provided for, casualties amongst these men were high.

=== Re-organisation and garrison duties in Australia ===
While the troops who had boarded the Orcades went into captivity on Java, the five officers and 257 other ranks that had been transported on the eight smaller ships returned to Australia in the last week of March 1942. Arriving at Port Adelaide, the battalion's vehicles, weapons and heavy equipment was moved to Morphettville Racecourse and the remaining personnel concentrated at Sandy Creek. On 15 April 1942, the order was passed to re-form the battalion, under Lieutenant Colonel Sidney Reed, the battalion's original second-in-command. Reinforcements arrived from various locations, including the Machine Gun Training Battalion based at Camden, New South Wales, while others came from the 2/1st Machine Gun Battalion to provide a cadre of experienced personnel.

In May, the battalion moved to Balcombe on the Mornington Peninsula in Victoria, where they undertook range shoots, planning exercises and bivouacks. In mid-July, the 2/3rd received orders to move north to Cowra by road. Along the way, they stopped at Ingleburn, New South Wales where a draft of almost 400 reinforcements was received; the result of this was that in its second incarnation, about half the battalion came from New South Wales, instead of South Australia. The battalion remained in Cowra, where they carried out training, for ten months, eventually proceeding north to south-east Queensland in May 1943. Based around the Deception Bay area, north of Brisbane, a company was deployed to Moreton Island and another to Bribie Island. In late June, 'B' Company embarked upon the Dutch vessel, the SS Jansens and deployed to Netherlands New Guinea as part of Merauke Force, remaining there in a defensive capacity until May 1944.

While 'B' Company was deployed to Merauke, the remainder of the battalion moved to the Atherton Tablelands in mid-August 1943, at which time the battalion was transferred to the command of the 6th Division, assigned as a corps unit rather than a direct command unit. Lieutenant Colonel Roy Gordon, who had raised the original 'C' Company in 1940, took over command of the battalion in February 1944. A long period of relative inactivity subsequently followed as a result of inter-Allied service politics which saw the US Army assume primacy of operations in the Pacific, and indecision about the future role of Australian forces in the Pacific campaign. During this time, the battalion was based around Wondecla, south-west of Cairns. The battalion was transferred to the "tropical war establishment" during this period as part of an Army-wide reorganisation intended to optimise units for jungle warfare. As a result of this change, the battalion was required to return all of its vehicles, with the intention that its guns would largely be carried across the battlefield by soldiers moving on foot. The 2/3rd remained at Wondecla until 2 December 1944, when they entrained for Cairns and subsequently boarded the transport Evangeline, a former cruise ship, bound for New Guinea, where they were to undertake their final campaign of the war.

=== Aitape–Wewak: The final campaign ===
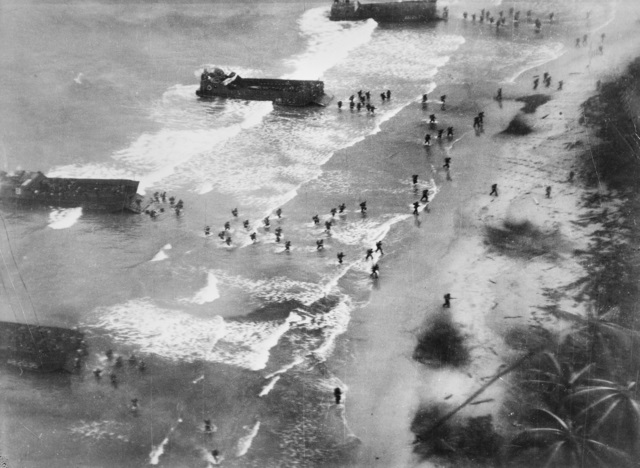
Farida Force landing at Dove Bay, May 1945

Although it had been intended to deploy the Australians as part of the Allied efforts to recapture the Philippines, this did not eventuate. Instead, the Australian troops were tasked with relieving the US forces around New Guinea, so that they could be redistributed in the Pacific. The 6th Division was subsequently assigned to take over from the US XI Corps around Aitape–Wewak. The campaign that followed was, in the words of author Eustace Keogh, essentially a "mopping up campaign", with the division being tasked with security of the airstrip and base area, and ensuring that contact was maintained with Japanese forces in the area. These tasks were to be achieved without large-scale offensive action, due to contingency plans for the division to be re-deployed to the Philippines; in the event this did not occur and the 6th Division remained in Aitape–Wewak for the remainder of the war.

With priority of effort being given to the campaigns in the Philippines and Borneo, the arrival of the 6th Division took place over several months. Initially, they were camped around Tadji defending the airfield there, but after Christmas, the majority of the battalion – headquarters, headquarters company and two machine gun companies – was assigned to the 19th Brigade as they advanced west along the coast towards the Danmap, switching to providing support to the 16th Brigade in early January as it drove towards Abau; in the open country of the coastal area the machine guns proved quite effective. While this took place, 'B' and 'D' Companies were assigned to the 17th Brigade, with whom they undertook a mainly defensive role around Aitape, while accompanying infantry patrols into the interior.

In February 1945, as the Australians began advancing into the thick, hilly interior, the utility of the machine guns decreased. At the behest of Brigadier Roy King, commander of the 16th Brigade, the 2/3rd Machine Gun Battalion was hastily converted into a standard infantry battalion, which was achieved with a quick issue of rifles, sub-machine guns and mortars. From then until the end of the war, the battalion took part in the ground advance through Wewak and beyond, fighting a series of small scale patrol actions, initially advancing through Arohemi and Muguluwela, and finally the town of But, while 'B' Company was assigned to Farida Force and carried out an amphibious landing around Dove Bay, in early May. The battalion later moved into the Mandi and Brandi areas where they were tasked with re-invigorating the Australian operations in the area, as Japanese resistance around the plantations increased. By late July, the majority of the battalion moved to Wewak Point, while two companies remained in the vicinity of Mandi–Bandi; operations in the area had killed 59 Japanese, for the loss of four men from 2/3rd killed in action and eight wounded. The battalion's final action of the war came on 7 August when a patrol killed four Japanese. A week later, the Japanese surrender was announced, bringing combat operations officially to an end. The battalion's final campaign of the war cost them 94 battle casualties.

=== Disbandment ===
In late August, following the conclusion of hostilities the 2/3rd was concentrated at Wewak Point, in the 19th Brigade's area, where final parades were held and education classes commenced to prepare the soldiers for discharge and return to civilian life. Meanwhile, following the conclusion of hostilities, the battalion's personnel were slowly transferred to other units or repatriated back to Australia for demobilisation. In early December 1945, the 2/3rd's remaining personnel returned to Australia aboard the British aircraft carrier HMS Implacable, arriving in Sydney, and the following month, in January 1946, after final clearances had been obtained the unit was disbanded. During the war the battalion lost 202 men killed or died on active service, of which 56 were killed in action, 139 died while prisoners of war and seven in accidents or illness on active service. Members of the battalion received the following decorations: one Distinguished Service Order, three Military Crosses, four Military Medals, one British Empire Medal and 21 Mentions in Despatches. In addition, one member was appointed as a Commander of the Order of the British Empire and four were appointed as Members of the Order of the British Empire.

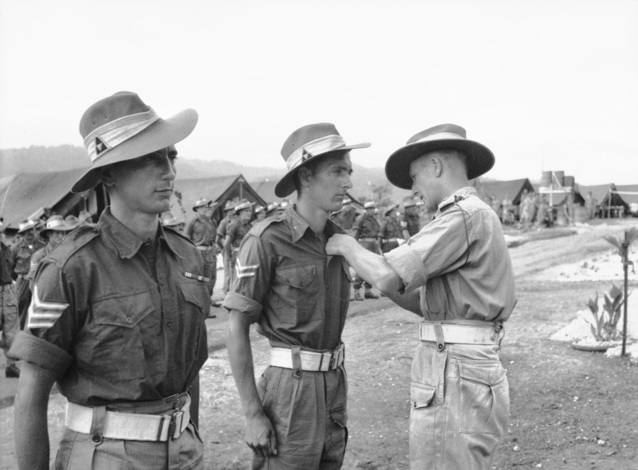
Final parade at Wewak Point, 2 October 1945

After the war, the Australian Army moved away from the machine gun battalion construct and consequently no similar units have been raised since, with the role being subsumed into the support companies of individual infantry battalions. The concept was arguably misunderstood by Australian commanders throughout the war, and this may have influenced the decision to move away from the concept. When the units had been established, the intent had been that the machine gun battalions would provide highly mobile fire support; however, this was largely only applicable in theatres where principles of open warfare could be applied. Once the focus of Australian Army combat operations shifted to the Pacific, the machine gun battalions were largely misused, being employed in a static defensive capacity against short and medium range targets, or for menial tasks, rather than as offensive fire support weapons that could have been employed to provide long range fire support. The medium machine guns were also largely utilised in the same manner as light machine guns, such as the Bren. Other reasons identified for the concept's limited use include distrust of overhead fire by some commanders, a preference for organic fire support over attached sub-units, over-estimating the difficulty of transporting Vickers guns in the jungle, and a tendency to ignore targets that could not be seen. The difficulties of target acquisition in dense jungle also contributed. For the 2/3rd, the Syrian campaign was the only one of its three campaigns where it was employed wholly as a machine gun unit in support of the infantry; on Java and in Aitape–Wewak, it was utilised as infantry.

== Battle honours ==
The 2/3rd Machine Gun Battalion received the following battle honours:

- Anumb River, But–Dagua, Damour, Jebel Mazar, Jezzine, Nambut Ridge, Sidon, and Syria 1941.

== Commanding officers ==
The following officers commanded the 2/3rd Machine Gun Battalion during the war:

- Lieutenant Colonel Arthur Blackburn (1940–1942)
- Lieutenant Colonel Edward Lyneham (1942)
- Lieutenant Colonel Sidney Reed (1942–1944)
- Lieutenant Colonel Roy Gordon (1944–1945)

Of these, both Blackburn and Reed were World War I veterans who had later served in the Militia in the 18th Light Horse Regiment, in South Australia, during the inter-war years. Lyneham and Gordon had both served in the Militia before the war, with Lyneham serving in the 28th Battalion, The Swan Regiment in Western Australia and Gordon in the 6th Battalion, Royal Melbourne Regiment. Gordon later reached the rank of major general.

== Notes ==
Footnotes

Citations
