= Jesse Winters =

American baseball player (1893–1986)

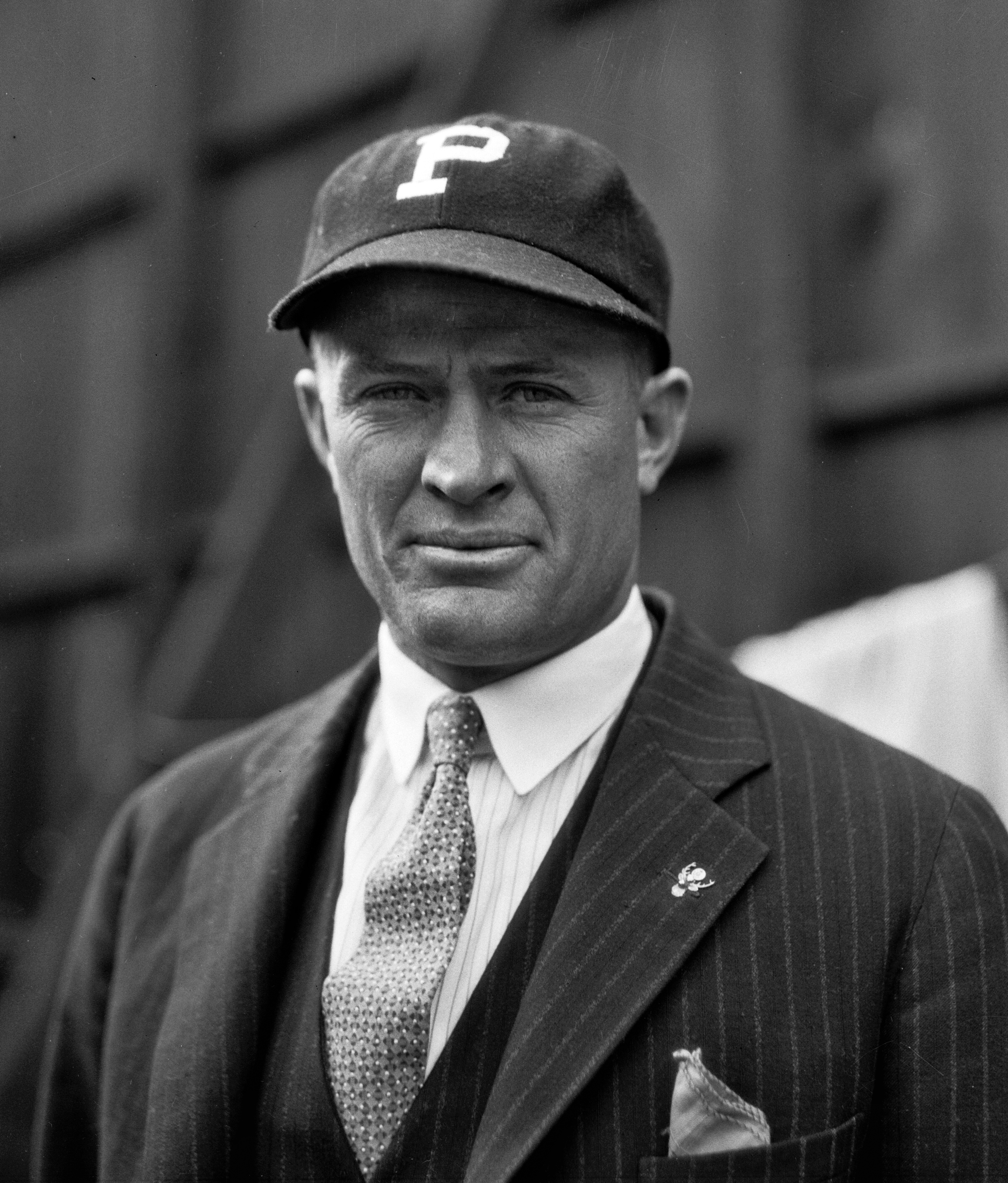
- Winters in the 1930s
- Pitcher
- Born: December 22, 1893; Stephenville, Texas, U.S.
- Died: June 5, 1986 (aged 92); Abilene, Texas, U.S.
- Batted: Right Threw: Right

MLB debut
- May 3, 1919, for the New York Giants

Last MLB appearance
- July 30, 1923, for the Philadelphia Phillies

MLB statistics
- Win–loss record: 13–24
- Earned run average: 5.04
- Strikeouts: 94
- Stats at Baseball Reference

Teams
- New York Giants (1919–1920); Philadelphia Phillies (1921–1923)

Jesse Franklin Winters (December 22, 1893 – June 5, 1986), nicknamed "Buck" and "T-Bone", was an American right-handed Major League Baseball (MLB) pitcher who played for the New York Giants and the Philadelphia Phillies from 1919 to 1923. He also played in the minor leagues until 1925 for the Kansas City Blues, Toronto Maple Leafs, Hartford Senators, Portland Beavers and Wichita Falls Spudders. He was listed during his playing career as 6' 1" and 165 pounds.

He began his professional career in 1916 at the age of 22 and played for nine seasons, until the age of 31 in 1925. He split his career between the major leagues and the minors, spending four full seasons and a part of a fifth at the former level. In the minors, he spent two full seasons at the Double-A level, parts of two seasons at the Double-A level and part of one season at the Single-A level. Based on the record that is available, it is known that he pitched in 106 minor league games, going 36–36 with a 3.70 ERA in 656 innings. He also had 241 at bats, hitting .212 with four doubles.

He played in the major leagues from 1919 to 1923, appearing in 110 games and going 13–24 with a 5.04 ERA in 405 innings. He allowed 510 hits and 164 walks, while striking out 94 batters. He was used both as a relief pitcher and a starting pitcher, finishing in the top 10 on the National League leader board in games finished and saves multiple times. As a batter, he hit .171 in 117 at bats and in the field, he committed 10 errors for a .929 fielding percentage. He was also involved in six double plays.

He was a highly touted young player at the onset of his career, being initially compared to Hall of Fame pitcher Christy Mathewson and eventually former 21-game winner Ferdie Schupp. According to contemporary accounts of the time, his assets were many-fold: "He has every physical qualification", stated the New York Tribune, "as well as a varied assortment in the pitching line." He also had a quick pickoff move to first base, with Giants' manager John McGraw claiming "(Winters) can peg to first base more quickly than any other man in the National League." He performed well in the minor leagues, however a lack of control at the major league level, an indifference towards the game, a lack of ambition and eventually a bad arm ended his hopes of stardom.

Following his playing career, he owned a tire company in Abilene, Texas, later becoming that town's mayor.

== Early and personal life ==
Winters was born on December 22, 1893, in Stephenville, Texas, to John W. Winters and Frances Ruth Winters, the oldest of five children. Prior to playing baseball professionally, he attended two Texas-based universities, playing football and baseball at John Tarleton Junior College, now known as Tarleton State University (into whose Hall of Fame he was elected in 1980), and Hardin–Simmons University. It was during his time at Tartleton State University that he acquired the nickname "T-Bone." While dining at a restaurant on a road trip, he ordered a T-bone steak. When his waitress brought him a boneless piece of meat, he became unhappy and created a scene. As a result, his teammates gave him the nickname "T-Bone."

There have been multiple printed variations of his name. He is listed as Jesse Frank Winters on Baseball-Reference.com; however, his middle name is also listed as Franklin by other sources and his first name was commonly spelled "Jess" during his playing days.

== Professional career ==
=== Early years ===
Winters began his professional career in 1916 with the Denison Railroaders of the Western Association, though the league disbanded in midsummer. He was preparing to enter medical school following his tryout with Denison, however the Giants signed him to a professional contract. He practiced with the Giants during spring training in 1918, trying out for the team out of college.

He was released to the Kansas City Blues of the American Association under an optional agreement prior to the beginning of the 1918 season.

He spent all of 1918 with the Blues, going 3–2 with a 2.42 ERA in 13 games. In 67 innings, he allowed 64 hits, 23 walks and nine unearned runs. His early performance impressed Hall of Fame Giants manager John McGraw so much that McGraw considered Winters "...the finest pitching prospect he had seen since Christy Mathewson..."

Winters also served in the United States Army after being drafted in June of that year. He served as a lieutenant at a San Antonio-area training camp. His professional career was threatened that year, as his outfit had been ordered overseas to fight in World War I. However, the war soon ended and Winters was never sent overseas, allowing him to make his major league debut the following season.

=== Major league debut ===
On April 12, 1919, it was announced that Winters had made the Giants' roster for the upcoming season. The team played its first game of the year on April 23, and about two weeks later, on May 3, Winters made his major league debut.

Pitching against the Philadelphia Phillies that day, Giants' starter Jean Dubuc allowed three runs in 5.1 innings. Winters was called upon to relieve Dubuc and pitched 3.2 scoreless innings. He struck out two batters and walked one, while allowing three hits. The Giants won the game 4–3, with Winters earning the win.

At the start of the regular season, manager McGraw was "banking heavily" on the success of Winters as a regular on the staff. Winters played 16 games with the Giants that year, appearing mostly in relief. He won one game while losing two, posting a 5.46 ERA with 13 walks and six strikeouts in 28 innings. He saved three games that year, tying for second in the National League behind Oscar Tuero with, among others, Jean Dubuc. He also finished 11 games, which tied for seventh most in the league and second-most on the team, behind Dubuc. He also hit three batters, which was second on the team behind Rube Benton.

Despite being used primarily as a reliever, Winters also started two matches. His first start came on August 22 against the St. Louis Cardinals. He allowed five hits, four walks and three runs to score in 2 1/3 innings and was replaced by Dubuc.

He made his second start on August 28 against the Phillies. In six innings, he allowed 10 hits and four walks, which led to nine earned runs. He was again replaced by Dubuc and earned the loss.

=== 1920: Last year with the Giants ===
While prior to his major league career Winters was being compared to Christy Mathewson, by April 12, 1920, the Milwaukee Sentinel was comparing him to Ferdie Schupp. The newspaper noted Winters' lack of control on the mound and related him to Schupp, who, like Winters, was a very highly touted prospect that initially showed poor control. As Winters did not appear in many games in his rookie season, Schupp too spent the early part of his career primarily in the dugout. However, by 1917, he blossomed by winning 21 games for the Giants. The newspaper predicted a similar output by Winters.

During that year's spring training, he quarreled with batter Benny Kauff, which came to fisticuffs before teammates pried them apart and on August 28 of that year, he got into a fistfight with teammate Ross Youngs. He would later be described by The Oklahoma Miner as temperamental and high-strung.

Winters appeared as a reliever in 21 games for the Giants that year, going 0–0 with a 3.50 ERA. He walked 28 batters and struck out 14 in 46 1/3 innings. He also finished 13 games, which tied Earl Hamilton and George Smith for seventh most in the league.

In 1920, Winters set a record that would stand until 1925. He became the first pitcher ever to appear in 20 or more games in a season without earning a decision. The previous record was 17 appearances, reached by Hooks Wiltse in 1913. The record was broken five years later by Jack Wisner, who made 25 appearances without a win or loss. Coincidentally, both Wiltse and Wisner pitched for the Giants when they set their respective marks.

=== Back to the minors and Philadelphia Phillies ===
On January 7, 1921, the Giants released Winters and fellow pitcher Bunny Hearn to the Milwaukee Brewers of the American Association, though by early February Winters' release was recalled and he returned to the Giants. He was then released to the Toronto Maple Leafs of the International League with Vern Spencer on April 11. He pitched in 21 games for the Maple Leafs, going 11–8 with a 2.91 ERA. In 161 innings, he allowed 156 hits, 54 walks and 23 unearned runs. He also finished third on the team in winning percentage (.579).

In July, the Giants traded Winters to the Phillies. There is some uncertainty as to who was involved in the deal that sent Winters to the Phillies and when the deal took place. One source says he was traded on July 25 with Curt Walker, Butch Henline and $30,000 for Irish Meusel and another source claims he was traded with John Monroe for pitcher Cecil "Red" Causey on July 10.

He was used mostly as a starting pitcher for the Phillies in 1921, starting 14 of the 18 games in which he appeared. He went 5–10 with 10 complete games and a 3.63 ERA in 114 innings, allowing 142 hits, 27 unearned runs and 28 walks while striking out 22 batters. He led the team's starting pitchers in ERA. At the plate, he collected five hits in 39 at-bats for a .128 batting average.

On July 21, he was involved in a triple play. He was on first base when Goldie Rapp hit a line drive to the St. Louis Cardinals' second baseman Rogers Hornsby, who tossed the ball to second base to get John Peters. The ball was thrown to first before Winters could return, thus completing the play.

Winters began the 1922 season by posting a 2.25 ERA in his first 16 innings of work. He then posted a 5.74 ERA the rest of the way, en route to a season record of 6–6 and an ERA of 5.34 in 34 games, nine of which he started. He walked 56 batters and had 29 strikeouts. He was second on the team in winning percentage (.500, behind Petie Behan) and games finished (16, one behind George Smith), also leading the club in saves, with two. He tied for seventh in the league in saves and eighth in the league in games finished. At the plate, he hit .256 with two doubles in 45 at bats.

He played his final major league season in 1923, going 1–6 with a 7.35 ERA in 21 games, six of which he started. In 78.1 innings, he allowed 116 hits and 39 walks, while striking out 23 batters. He threw one complete game, against the Brooklyn Dodgers on April 27. His four fielding errors were the fourth-most in the league.

Through May 16, he was 1–2 with a 4.60 ERA in seven games. Due to his performance to that point in the season, Phillies manager Art Fletcher requested waivers for Winters, which could have potentially ended the pitcher's major league career at that point. However, he stuck around until July 30, his final major league game. After his final big league appearance, the Phillies sent Winters to the Hartford Senators of the Eastern League, with whom he played until the end of the season.

=== Final years ===
He began 1924 with the Phillies in spring training, however he was sold to the Portland Beavers before the season began. He appeared in 42 games for the Beavers that year, going 16–20 with a 4.11 ERA. In 285 innings, he allowed 333 hits and 101 walks, leading the team in victories, innings pitched, runs allowed (174) and bases on balls. He finished second behind Charlie Eckert in losses, games, hits allowed and earned runs allowed (144).

He spent the majority of 1925 with the Beavers, going 5–6 with a 5.17 ERA. He also appeared in eight games for the Wichita Falls Spudders, posting a 1–0 record and a 2.57 ERA. Combined, he went 6–6 with a 4.41 ERA in 30 games, walking 71 batters and allowing 116 hits in 143 innings. He retired due to a bad pitching arm.

== Post-playing career and death ==
Following his playing career, Winters became a businessman, opening up D&W Tire Company in Abilene, Texas, in 1929, which he owned until 1950. He later served as the mayor of Abilene from 1957 to 1959, where he died on June 5, 1986, at the age of 92. Winters was a strong advocate for Interstate 20 and the western loop (U.S. Route 83) in Abilene; the loop was named the Winters Freeway after him. He was interred at Elmwood Memorial Park in Abilene.
