= Elmwood Memorial Park =

Cemetery in Abilene, Texas

Coordinates: 32.4139°N 99.8006°W

- Interactive map of Elmwood Memorial Park

Details
- Established: 1946
- Location: Abilene, Texas
- No. of interments: Over 30,000

Elmwood Memorial Park is a cemetery located in Abilene, Taylor County, Texas, United States. It has in excess of 30,000 interments. The first burials at this cemetery took place in 1946.

== Notable burials ==
One-time professional baseball player Jesse Winters is interred there. Other notables include actor James Drury, football player Jim Parmer and WWII Hero Frank Fujita.
