= Yumio Nasu =

Japanese general

- 那須 弓雄
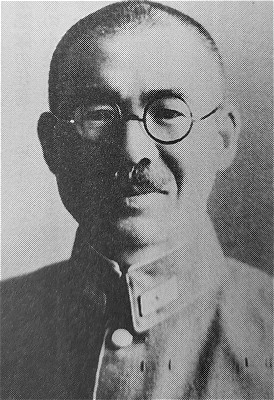
- Born: June 27, 1892; Tochigi, Japan
- Died: October 26, 1942 (aged 50); Guadalcanal, Solomon Islands
- Education: Imperial Japanese Army Academy; Army Staff College
- Military career
- Allegiance: Empire of Japan
- Branch: Imperial Japanese Army
- Service years: 1913–1942
- Rank: Lieutenant General (posthumous)
- Units: Imperial Japanese Army General Staff; Taiwan Army of Japan; Kwantung Army; IJA 2nd Division
- Commands: IJA 3rd Infantry Brigade; Nasu Detachment; IJA 2nd Division
- Conflicts: Second Sino-Japanese War; Operation Chahar; World War II; Dutch East Indies Campaign; Battle of Java; Battle of Leuwiliang; Guadalcanal Campaign; October Matanikau action; Battle for Henderson Field (DOW)

Yumio Nasu (那須 弓雄, Nasu Yumio; June 27, 1892 – October 26, 1942) was a major general and a division commander in the Imperial Japanese Army during World War II. He was posthumously promoted to lieutenant general.

== Biography ==
A native of Tochigi Prefecture, Nasu graduated from the 25th class of the Imperial Japanese Army Academy in 1913 and from the 35th class of the Army Staff College in 1923. He served in various staff positions within the Imperial Japanese Army General Staff, and was assigned to the Taiwan Army of Japan in 1917. In 1935 he served on the staff of the Kwantung Army and participated in Operation Chahar. Nasu was promoted to major general in 1940, and became commander of the IJA 3rd Infantry Brigade.

Nasu commanded a detachment (named after him) during the Battle of Java in the Dutch East Indies campaign. Landing on March 1, 1942, the detachment rapidly progressed across Western Java, facing its heaviest resistance in the Battle of Leuwiliang against primarily Australian troops commanded by Arthur Blackburn.

During the Guadalcanal campaign Nasu landed on Guadalcanal with the IJA 2nd Division during the first week of October 1942 in response to the Allied landings on the island. Nasu commanded one of the 2nd Division's large infantry groups, comprising infantry battalions from several regiments during the resulting October Matanikau action and Battle for Henderson Field. On October 25, 1942, while leading his troops against United States positions, Nasu was mortally wounded by rifle fire and died early the next morning.

He was posthumously promoted to lieutenant general.

== Bibliography ==
- Griffith, Samuel B. (1966) [1963]. The Battle for Guadalcanal (1st ed.). New York: Ballantine Books. OCLC 2362805.
- Fuller, Richard (1992). Shokan: Hirohito's Samurai. London: Arms and Armour Press. ISBN 1-85409-151-4.
- Rottman, Gordon L. (2005). Duncan Anderson (ed.). Japanese Army in World War II: The South Pacific and New Guinea, 1942-43. Oxford and New York: Osprey. ISBN 1-84176-870-7.
- Hough, Frank O.; Ludwig, Verle E.; Shaw, Henry I. Jr. "Pearl Harbor to Guadalcanal". History of U.S. Marine Corps Operations in World War II.
- Miller, John Jr. (1995) [1949]. Guadalcanal: The First Offensive. United States Army in World War II. United States Army Center of Military History. CMH Pub 5-3. Archived from the original on 2007-12-25.
- Shaw, Henry I. (1992). "First Offensive: The Marine Campaign For Guadalcanal". Marines in World War II Commemorative Series.
- Zimmerman, John L. (1949). "The Guadalcanal Campaign". Marines in World War II Historical Monograph.
