= Lost Battalion (Pacific, World War II) =

US Army unit captured by Japan in 1942

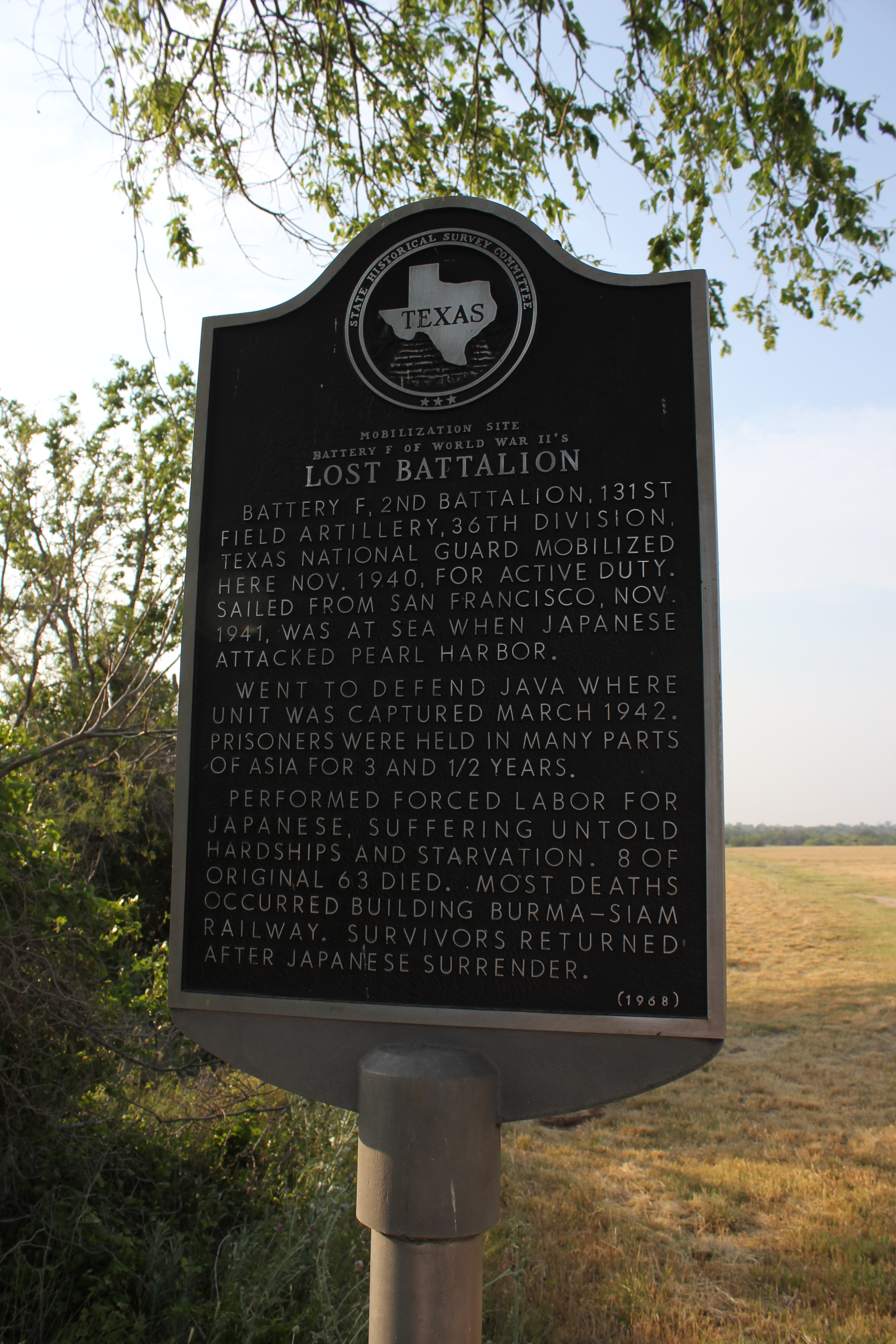
Texas Historical Marker for the Lost Battalion (Jacksboro, Texas)

The Lost Battalion was the 2nd Battalion, 131st Field Artillery, 36th Infantry Division (Texas National Guard) of the U.S. Army. The men of the battalion, plus the survivors of the sunken cruiser USS Houston, were captured by the Japanese on the island of Java in the Dutch East Indies (now Indonesia) in March 1942. It is called the lost battalion because the fate of the men was unknown to the United States until September 1944. They were prisoners of war for 42 months until the end of World War II. 534 soldiers from the battalion and 368 survivors of Houston were taken prisoner. Most of the men were sent to Thailand to work on the Burma Railway, the building of which is portrayed in the film The Bridge on the River Kwai. Of the 902 soldiers and sailors taken captive, 163 died in captivity. Most of the prisoners of war were from western Texas.

Sergeant Frank Fujita was a notable survivor who was a POW for three and a half years. He went on to write the memoir Foo: A Japanese-American Prisoner of the Rising Sun.

== 2nd Battalion ==
The 2nd Battalion, 131st Field Artillery Regiment (75mm Gun) (Truck-Drawn) was assigned to the 36th Division, Texas National Guard and was mobilized on 25 November 1940. The battalion of Texas soldiers consisted of a Headquarters Battery from Decatur and Wichita Falls, Firing Batteries D, E, and F from Wichita Falls, Abilene, and Jacksboro, a Service Battery from Lubbock and Plainview, and a Medical Detachment from Plainview. The majority of the men were from 18 to 22 years old. The battalion was armed with twelve (four per battery) 75mm M1897A4 guns known as "French seventy-fives."

The Battalion sailed from San Francisco on 21 November 1941 assigned to the Philippines, but with the outbreak of World War II in the Pacific the convoy was rerouted to Brisbane, Australia. After Christmas in Brisbane, the Battalion sailed again on a Dutch freighter, arriving on the island of Java on 11 January 1942 with 558 men. The 2nd Battalion was the only U.S. ground force to arrive in the Dutch East Indies. The mission of the Battalion was to help the Dutch defend the islands from a possible Japanese invasion, which in fact began on 27 February 1942. During the Battle of Java, the Battalion distinguished itself supporting the Australian defense of Leuwiliang and fighting alongside the Dutch at Porong. The Battalion would later be awarded a Presidential Unit Citation.

On 8 March 1942, the allies in the Dutch East Indies surrendered to the Japanese. Among the 32,500 soldiers taken prisoner, mostly Dutch, British, and Australian, were 534 members of the U.S. battalion, 21 men of the original 558 having been transferred and three killed in action. 99 of the American POWs were from E Battery which had been detached from the main body of the battalion. They would have a different POW history than the others.

== USS Houston ==
USS Houston was commissioned in 1929 and had a crew of 1,100. On 3 Nov 1941, Houston left the United States and sailed to the Philippines, arriving 19 November, to become the flagship of the United States' Asiatic Fleet. She was at sea on 7 December when the Pacific War began and spent the first two months of the war escorting convoys from Australia to the Dutch East Indies. On 3 February 1942, Houston was damaged in an air attack at the Battle of Makassar Strait which killed 48 men. Houston also participated in the Battle of the Java Sea on 27 February before being sunk in the Battle of Sunda Strait on 28 February – 1 March 1942, along with the Australian light cruiser HMAS Perth and the Dutch destroyer HNLMS Evertsen. 696 crew members died; the remaining 368 were captured and made prisoners of war by the Japanese.

== Burma railway ==
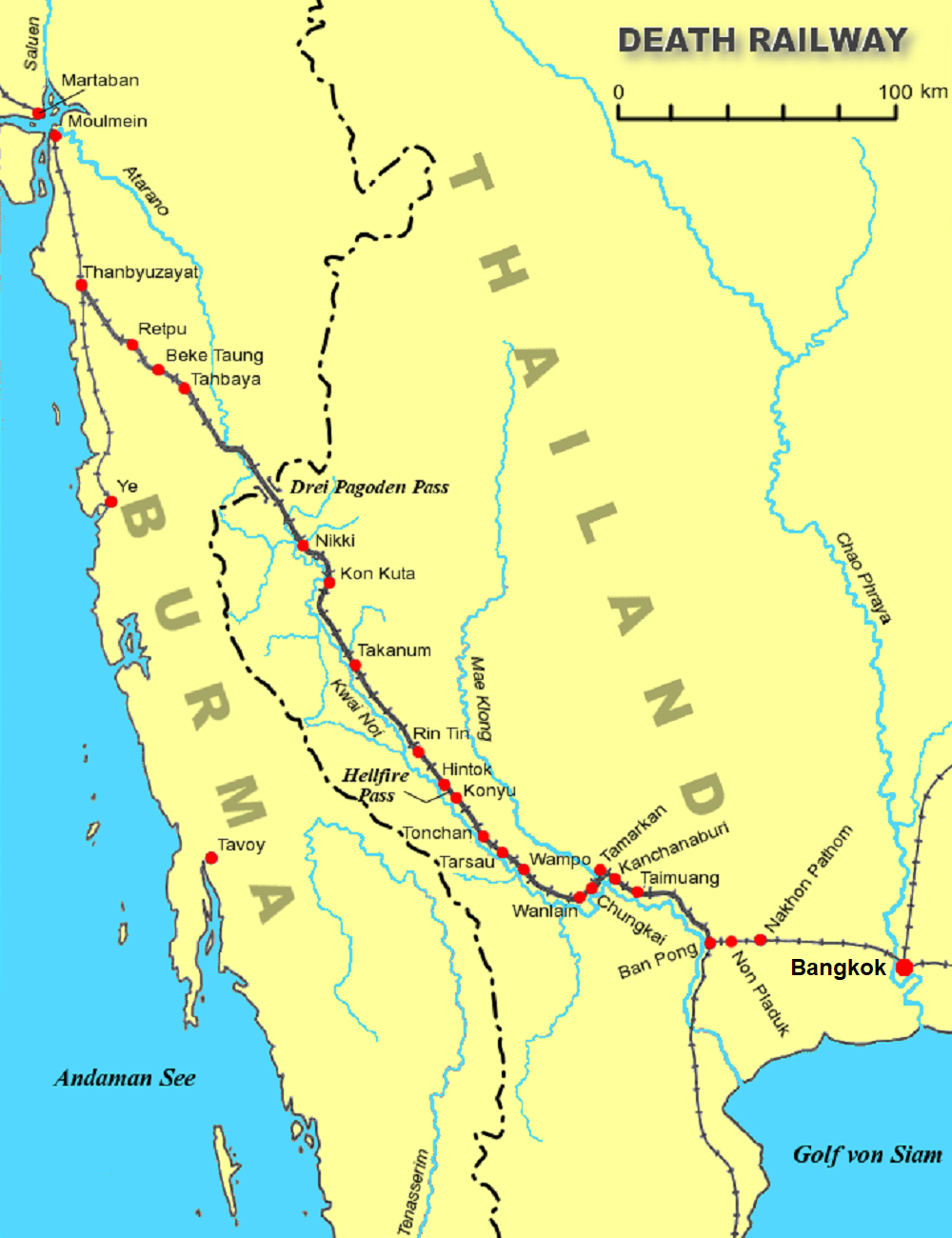
Map of the Burma Railway

The captured American soldiers and sailors were held for seven months in a prison camp on Java along with thousands of Dutch, British, and Australian soldiers. In October 1942, they were taken to Singapore and 668 of them then continued onward to Moulmein, Burma. In Singapore about 140 of the Americans with industrial skills were separated from the main body and sent to Japan to work there.

The Americans were part of a group of about 300,000 workers, mostly Southeast Asians but including 66,000 POWs, put to work building the railroad that would cross the mountains for a distance of 258 miles (415 km) between Burma and Thailand. Before World War II, the British had contemplated building the railway, but had rejected the idea. For more than a year, the Asian laborers and POWs worked on the railway using only hand tools. It was completed on October 23, 1943.

Conditions during the construction were brutal. The POWs and other workers suffered from insufficient food, poor medical care, murderous guards, and heavy work quotas. Tens of thousands died during the construction, including 133 Americans, 19.6 percent of the total number of American POWs who worked on the Burma railway. By the end of the construction only about 40 of the Americans were still capable of manual labor.

After the completion of the railroad, the survivors of the Lost Battalion were separated, some remaining to maintain the railroad, others being assigned to work in Thailand or Vietnam, and some sent to Japan to labor in coal mines on Hokkaido. 18 Americans were killed on June 24, 1944, when an American submarine sank the Japanese freighter on which they were traveling en route to Japan.

== E Battery ==
The 99 men of E Battery were captured and held prisoner separately from the other personnel of the lost battalion. Captured in early March 1942, E Battery was housed initially in Surabaja with Dutch, British, and Australian soldiers. In October 1942 they were sent to Changi Prison in Singapore on board an overcrowded cargo ship and in November they were sent by ship to Fukuoka, Japan to work in the shipyards there. In June 1945 they were moved again to labor in coal mines on Kyushu and remained there until the end of the war in August. Ninety-one of the members of E Battery survived the war.

== Discovery by United States ==
American authorities had no information about the fate of the lost battalion until September 16, 1944. On that date, American submarines sank two Japanese freighters which were transporting more than 2,000 British and Australian POWs to Japan. The surviving POWs told the U.S. that American soldiers from the Second Battalion and sailors from USS Houston had worked with them on the Burma railroad. After the end of the war in August 1945, the POWs of the lost battalion were repatriated from their various locations to the United States.

Of 534 personnel of the 2nd Battalion taken prisoner, 86 (16%) died in captivity. Of 368 Navy and Marine Corps personnel taken prisoner, 77 (21%) died in captivity. Five commissioned officers (3 percent of the total dead) were among those dying in captivity. About 10 percent of the prisoners were officers.
