= John David Provoo =

American soldier convicted of treason (1917–2001)

- Born: August 6, 1917; San Francisco, California
- Died: August 28, 2001 (aged 84); Hilo, Hawaii
- Burial place: East Hawaii Veterans Cemetery No. 2
- Other name: Nichijo Shaka
- Spouse: Antoinette Madill (divorced)
- Military career
- Allegiance: United States
- Branch: United States Army
- Rank: Staff sergeant
- Known for: Treason conviction (overturned)
- Conflicts: Battle of Corregidor
- Other work: Buddhist leader

John David Provoo (August 6, 1917 – August 28, 2001) was a United States Army staff sergeant and practicing Buddhist who was convicted of treason for his conduct as a Japanese prisoner of war during World War II. His conviction was later overturned on a technicality, and he became a Buddhist priest.

== Childhood ==
Provoo was born in San Francisco, California, on August 6, 1917. He began to practise Buddhism as a teenager, and became a strict adherent. His brother George recalled how he would stand at the kitchen sink saving ants from drowning, in accordance with the Buddhist principle of the sanctity of life. He also began studying the Japanese language around that time, with a Buddhist priest as his teacher. He worked for a time in a federal bank in San Francisco, and in 1940 moved to Japan to study in a Buddhist monastery near Tokyo.

== World War II ==
When the United States entered World War II, Provoo returned to the United States and enlisted in the United States Army. He was sent to the Philippines, where he worked as a G-2 clerk at the army headquarters in Manila. His Japanese language skills won him consideration for the Counter Intelligence Corps, but he was rejected because a background check led officials to suspect he might be homosexual and the time he had spent in Japan made them question his loyalty. He was captured by Japanese forces in the Battle of Corregidor in 1942 and made a prisoner of war.

According to his fellow prisoners, Provoo used his fluent Japanese to rise to a position of power in the POW camp and he abused his fellow prisoners to gain additional privileges from the Japanese. In accounts that vary in their details, Provoo shot an army captain named Burton C. Thomson, a veterinarian stationed on Corregidor, or reported him to Japanese troops who shot him. One American prisoner stated that Thomson had provoked Provoo by responding to his demand that he bring him some food with a comment to the effect that the next time he saw Provoo, he would kick him so hard that he could taste his boot. Another said Thomson had refused Provoo's demand to move American prisoners out of hospital beds to make room for Japanese troops. One POW wrote in his memoirs that Provoo was so hated by his fellow prisoners that one had tried to kill him by putting ground glass in his food, and that Provoo later threatened to kill a colonel named Cooper. The diaries of Frank Fujita, one of the few Japanese American soldiers captured by the Japanese during World War II, placed Provoo on Taiwan and then at Camp Omori, a Tokyo Bay facility that housed prisoners making propaganda broadcasts for the Japanese.

After the war, Provoo was arrested, but then released in 1946 after eight months of investigation which concluded that there was no evidence he had collaborated with the Japanese. He re-enlisted in the army six weeks later.

== Re-arrest and trial ==
Provoo had a difficult time in the Army. He was placed in Army stockades twice and hospitalized under restraints once. In 1949, the Army planned to court martial him for homosexuality, but instead made an arrangement with the U.S. Justice Department, which wanted to prosecute Provoo for treason, that they arrange for him to be discharged in New York, where the government thought it had a better chance of winning a conviction. The Army transferred Provoo under guard to Fort Jay on Governors Island, New York, and there he was dishonorably discharged from the Army on September 2, 1949. An hour after his release, the Federal Bureau of Investigation arrested him and charged him with treason. The story made the front page of the New York Times the following day. His trial was initially scheduled to begin in January 1950, but it was repeatedly delayed as the government sought to gather more witnesses and at one point in 1951 by Provoo's commitment to the Bellevue Hospital Center for psychiatric evaluation at the request of the prosecution.

His trial finally began on October 27, 1952. General Jonathan Wainwright testified for the defense in the trial's seventh week. He testified that he had never met Provoo nor heard any reports about him during the war, but described his experiences in Japanese POW camps, including the fact that he performed manual labor as the Japanese ordered. Lawyers had to shout their questions at him, as his exposure to loud shell bursts during the war had left him with a severe hearing impairment. The government called 34 witnesses, including 20 who traveled to New York from Japan to testify. Provoo was represented by unpaid court-appointed counsel. The defense called 35 witnesses. Provoo testified on his own behalf. When cross examined, he was asked to explain why, after re-enlisting, he had been imprisoned or hospitalized by the Army on various occasions. When the prosecutor asked, "Now, Mr. Provoo, isn't it a fact that in November 1946 you were hospitalized at Camp Lee, Virginia, because of homosexual aberrations?", Provoo's counsel asked for a mistrial without success. The prosecutor, over the objections of Provoo's counsel, continued the line of questioning, filling 200 pages of the court transcript.

After a fifteen-week trial, on February 11, 1953, the jury found Provoo guilty on charges of offering his services to the Japanese Army, helping to cause the execution of a fellow prisoner, and making two propaganda broadcasts on behalf of the Japanese. He was the eighth U.S. citizen convicted of treason after World War II, and only the second whose conviction related to actions during imprisonment in a POW camp. When his sentence was announced the following week, the court spared him from execution on grounds of his emotional instability and sentenced him to life imprisonment and a $10,000 fine. In total, the costs of Provoo's trial were estimated at $1 million.

On August 27, 1954, a unanimous three-judge panel of the Second Circuit Court of Appeals overturned his conviction on the grounds that the cross-examination about his alleged homosexuality had prejudiced the jury and the venue was improper. Judge Thomas Walter Swan wrote:

It is obvious that the cross-examination informed the jury that on several occasions after reenlistment the defendant had been charged with being, or suspected by military authorities or hospital doctors of being, a homosexualist. Neither by court martial nor by a civil court was he ever brought to trial and convicted on any charge of sodomy. Obviously such a charge was utterly irrelevant to the issue whether he had committed treason while a prisoner of war. But these highly inflammatory and prejudicial collateral and irrelevant charges were brought to the jury's attention. Nor was it done by accident or unintentionally.... That the facts so developed were so prejudicial as to constitute reversible error, if they were improperly admitted, is too plain for debate. They had no relevancy to charges on which he was being tried and were certain to degrade him in the eyes of the jury.

Of the government's argument that the questioning was a legitimate way of testing Provoo's veracity, he wrote:

No authority has been cited which suggests that homosexuality indicates a propensity to disregard the obligation of an oath. The sole purpose and effect of this examination was to humiliate and degrade the defendant, and increase the probability that he would be convicted, not for the crime charged, but for his general unsavory character. Permitting it was error. The error was plainly prejudicial. Indeed we can conceive of no accusation which could have been more degrading in the eyes of the jury nor more irrelevant to the issue of treason on which he was being tried.

The court also ruled that the Army had improperly brought Provoo to New York for discharge only so he could be arrested and charged there, when he should have been discharged, arrested, and tried in Maryland.

Because the sixty-nine witnesses at Provoo's trial had been scattered all over the country and General Wainright had died, the Department of Justice doubted that Provoo could be retried. He was indicted again by a federal grand jury in Maryland on October 27, 1954, but U.S. District Court Judge Roszel C. Thomsen dismissed the case in March 1955, stating that Provoo's right to a speedy trial under the Sixth Amendment to the U.S. Constitution had been abrogated. The court noted that Provoo had spent five years in prison and that the government was responsible for much of the delay and for the fact that the New York conviction had been overturned. The court cited documents that had become part of the record showing that the government had brought the case in New York because they thought they had a greater chance of winning a conviction there. The prosecution asked the U.S. Supreme Court to review the case, but that court upheld the lower court's ruling in a per curiam ruling without recorded dissent on October 17, 1955.

== Later years ==
Provoo found it difficult to recover from being tried for treason. He said it felt like "towing a shipwreck" behind him. He settled in Baltimore, but had trouble holding down a job because of the publicity which had surrounded his trial. His wife divorced him. In September 1957, he was arrested in Lincoln, Nebraska, and pleaded guilty to a charge of contributing to the delinquency of a minor, a 16-year-old runaway boy from Maryland. He was sentenced on August 29, 1958, to three years in the men's reformatory.

After his release from prison, Provoo went to Japan to resume his Buddhist studies. At the Nichiren-shū Buddhist School, he was promoted to a high position, roughly equivalent to that of bishop in the Catholic Church. He returned to the United States to teach Buddhism, hoping to allow others to learn without having to relocate and learn Japanese as he had. In 1967 he settled on the island of Oahu where he led a Buddhist group. He later led a Buddhist group near the town of Pahoa on the Island of Hawaii. He also started up the non-profit Buddhist School of America. He built a small temple and some cabins. He lived there and usually had a few students living with him. As a Buddhist teacher, he went by the Buddhist name "Nichijo Shaka".

He died at Hilo Medical Center on August 28, 2001. His ashes were buried at the Hawaii Veteran's Cemetery No. 2.
