= Ludolph Hendrik van Oyen =

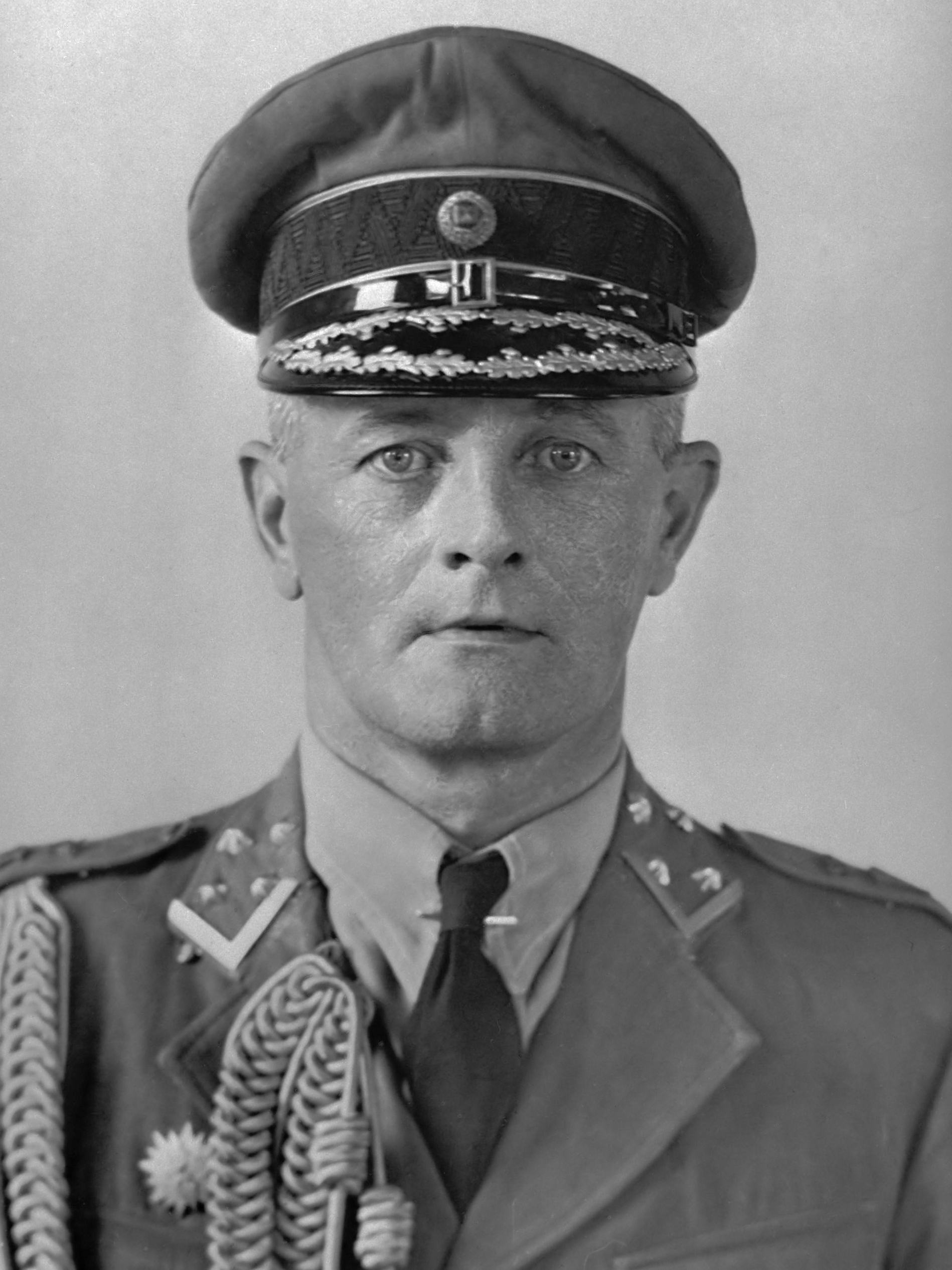
- Born: April 25, 1898; The Hague
- Died: 1953
- Military career
- Allegiance: Netherlands
- Branch: Royal Dutch East Indies Army
- Service years: 1906-1953
- Rank: Lieutenant-general
- Commands: Chief of Staff of the Royal Dutch East Indies Army
- Conflicts: World War II, Indonesian National Revolution
- Awards: Knight of the Order of the Dutch Lion; Officer of the Order of Orange-Nassau; Order of the Bath; Commander of the Order of Merit; 5th class Silver Cross of the Order of Virtuti Militari; Grand Cross of the Order of the Phoenix (Greece)

Major-general Ludolph Hendrik van Oyen (25 April 1889, in The Hague – 28 July 1953) was the Chief of Staff of the Royal Netherlands East Indies Army from 1942 to 1946, during World War II.

== History ==
Ludolph Hendrik van Oyen began his military career at the cadet school in Alkmaar from 1906, then, until 1911, at the Royal Military Academy in Breda. From 1922 to 1925 he attended the rank of captain in the Secondary School in The Hague and was afterwards appointed major and commander of the ML-KNIL. He would remain this under various ranks until he was promoted to major general in 1940. As commander, he managed to expand the view of the Japanese advance at the beginning of war.

== World War II ==
In 1942 he was appointed deputy commander of Vice-Marshal Sir Richard Peirse, who commanded the air forces within the ABDACOM, a collaboration between the American, British, Dutch and Australian forces on February 25, 1942, and conducted by Senior General Sir Archibald Wavell. After the Battle of the Java Sea the Japanese landed on Java on March 7, and Van Oyen fled along with Hubertus van Mook to Australia. Three days later the Dutch East Indies capitulated. In Australia, Van Oyen was charged with completing the flight training of pilots for the Royal Netherlands Military Flying School who also had gone to Australia. This flight training finally took place on the U.S. airbase in Jackson, Mississippi.

In October 1943, Van Oyen was promoted to Lieutenant general and deputy army commander of the KNIL, replacing Lieutenant General Hein ter Poorten, who at that time was taken prisoner by the Japanese. Oyens task was rebuilding the Dutch armed forces with a view to a Japanese surrender.

== Indonesian war of independence ==
After the Dutch East Indies was largely recaptured again in 1945 he tried to persuade the British to recover Dutch authority. The KNIL was still under the authority of the British at that time. Both Dutch and British generals felt that Sukarno and the newly proclaimed Republic of Indonesia had to be crushed but the British, led by Lord Mountbatten, and the commander in Batavia, Philip Christison, refused. Eventually Van Oyen offered, as a last means of pressure, his resignation to Van Mook and Lt.-Admiral Conrad Helfrich. He was succeeded by Lieutenant-General Simon Hendrik Spoor, whose ideas did not differ much from those of Van Oyen. He received an honorable discharge in January 1946.

== Trivia ==
Van Oyen remained until his death in 1953 commander of the Red Cross Corps. He was a knight of the Order of the Dutch Lion, Officer of the Order of Orange-Nassau, a member of the Order of the Bath, Commander of the Order of Merit and 5th class Silver Cross of the Order of Virtuti Militari (Poland).
