= Battle of Java (1942) =

Battle in the Pacific theatre of World War II

- Part of World War II, Pacific War
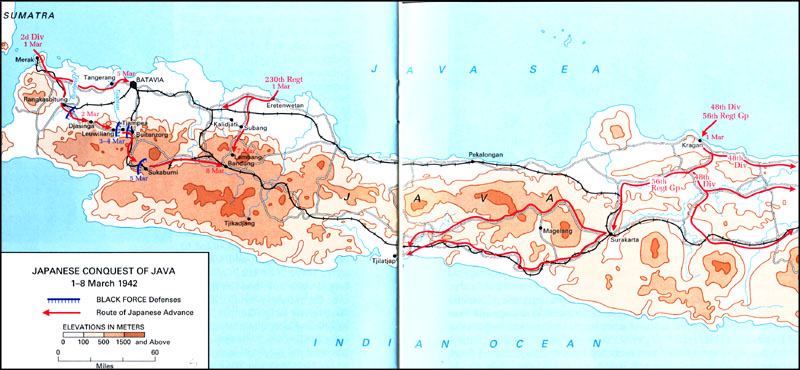
- Map depicting Allied defensive lines (in blue) and the movement of Japanese forces (red) in Java, 1–8 March 1942.
Date	28 February–12 March 1942 (1 week and 5 days)
Location	Java, Dutch East Indies
Result	Japanese victory

Belligerents
Netherlands; United Kingdom; Australia; United States	Japan

Commanders and leaders
(Netherlands) Hein ter Poorten (Netherlands) Hubertus van Mook (Netherlands) Ludolph Hendrik van Oyen	(Empire of Japan) Hitoshi Imamura

Strength
25,000; 5,500; 3,000; 750; Total: 34,250	40,000 troops

Casualties and losses
Netherlands: Unknown; Great Britain: Unknown; Australia: 36 killed 60 wounded 2,736 captured United States: 825 killed 1,067 captured (US Army: 24 killed, 534 captured. US Navy: 801 killed, 369 captured. 165 prisoners later died in captivity.) Japanese claim : 82,633 captured	Hundreds Killed or Wounded Japanese claim : 845 killed, 1,794 wounded

The Battle of Java (Invasion of Java, Operation J) was a battle of the Pacific theatre of World War II. It occurred on the island of Java from 28 February–12 March 1942. It involved forces from the Empire of Japan, which invaded on 28 February 1942, and Allied personnel. Allied commanders signed a formal surrender at Japanese headquarters at Bandung on 12 March.

== Background ==
The Japanese forces were composed of a western and an eastern invasion force. On 18 February, the western force sailed from Cam Ranh Bay with 56 transports carrying the 16th Army Headquarters, 2nd Infantry Division, the 38th Infantry Division, and the 230th Infantry Regiment. On 8 February, the eastern force sailed from Lingayen Gulf with 41 transports carrying elements of the 56th Regimental Combat Group. Their goal was the capture of the Kalidjati airfield, where Japanese bombers and fighters would then be based in support of the invasion.

The allies naval forces under the command of Helfrich, were likewise deployed into an Eastern Strike Force out of Soerabaja, and a Western Strike Force out of Tanjung Priok. On 25 February Helfrich combined these forces when the Japanese eastern force was spotted moving south from Balikpapan. Exeter and Perth then joined De Ruyter and Java, with their associated destroyer screens. Air coverage was provided by six Brewster F2A Buffalos and seven Hawker Hurricanes.

The Allied forces were commanded by the Royal Netherlands East Indies Army (KNIL) commander, General Hein ter Poorten. Java Air Command was led by Ludolph Hendrik van Oyen. The 6th Infantry Regiment remained in eastern Java to guard the naval base, while remaining troops were deployed to western Java. West Group of 21,200 troops, was led by W. Schilling, consisting of the 1st Infantry Regiment and Blackforce. Java Bandoeng Group of 5,900 troops, was led by Jacob Pesman, consisting of the 4th Infantry Regiment and the IInd Mountain Artillery Battalion.

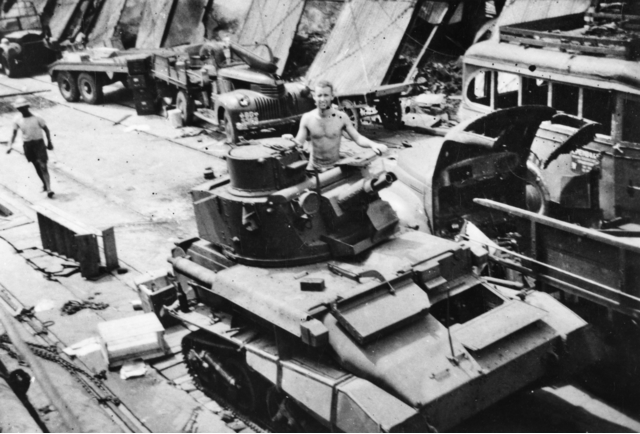
An MkV1B light tank of the 3rd Hussars disembarks at Sumatra on 14 February 1942.

The British, Australian and United States units were commanded by British Major General H. D. W. Sitwell. The British forces were predominantly anti-aircraft units: the 77th Heavy AA Regiment, 21st Light AA Regiment and 48th Light AA Regiment. The only British armoured unit on Java was B squadron from the British 3rd Hussars, which was equipped with light tanks. Two British AA regiments without guns, the 6th Heavy AA Regt and the 35th Light AA Regiment, were equipped as infantry to defend airfields. The British also had transport and administrative units.

The Australian formation – named "Blackforce" after its commander, Brigadier Arthur Blackburn V.C. – included the Australian 2/3rd Machine Gun Battalion, the Australian 2/2nd Pioneer Battalion, 2/6th Field Company Royal Australian Engineers, a platoon from the 2/1st Headquarters Guard Battalion, about 100 reinforcements diverted en route to Singapore, a handful of soldiers who had escaped from Singapore following its fall to the Japanese, two transport companies, a casualty clearing station, and a company headquarters unit. Blackburn decided to re-organise his troops as an infantry brigade. They were well equipped in terms of Bren guns, light armoured cars, and trucks, but they had few rifles, sub-machine guns, anti-tank rifles, mortars, grenades, radio equipment or Bren gun carriers. Blackburn managed to assemble an HQ staff and three infantry battalions based on the 2/3rd Machine Gun, the 2/2nd Pioneers, and a mixed "Reserve Group".

The only U.S. ground forces in Java, the 2nd Battalion of the 131st Field Artillery (a Texas National Guard unit intended for the Philippines) was attached to Black Force.

== Japanese landings ==
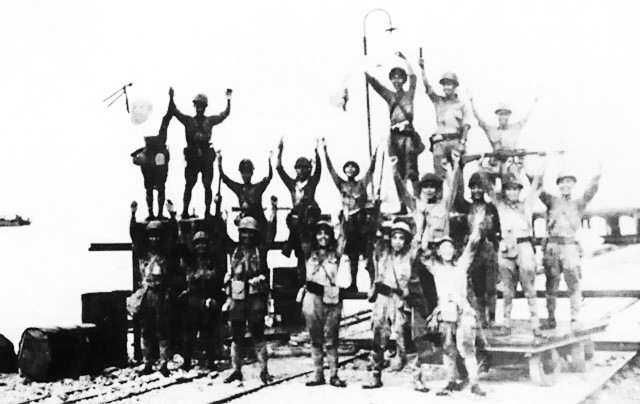
The Japanese 2nd Division landed at Merak, 1 March 1942

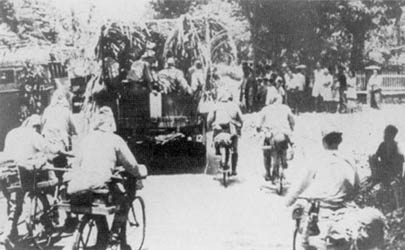
Japanese bicycle infantry moving through Java.

On 27 February, Helfich ordered the evacuation of all seaworthy ships in Tjilatjap after Chūichi Nagumo's 1st Air Fleet was sighted to the south. On 28 February, Helfich ordered Koenraad to evacuate Soerabaja. On 1 March, Helfich then dissolved the Allied Naval Forces on Java, freeing William A. Glassford's United States Navy ships to head for Exmouth Gulf, and Arthur Palliser's Royal Navy ships to head for India. Helfich also ordered damaged Dutch submarines to head for Colombo, while those remaining were ordered to resist as long as possible, then break out or be scuttled. Starting on 2 March, remaining Dutch ships in the Netherlands East Indies were scuttled over the next week, along with the destruction of the Morokrembangan Naval Air Base and Perak Airfield.

The Japanese troops landed at three points on Java on 1 March. The West Java invasion convoy landed on Bantam Bay near Merak and Eretan Wetan. The West Java convoy had previously fought in the Battle of Sunda Strait, a few hours prior to the landings.

Meanwhile, the East Java invasion convoy landed on Kragan after having defeated the ABDA fleet in the Battle of the Java Sea.

On 3 March, the U.S. Navy gunboat USS Asheville was sunk south of Java by a Japanese naval squadron consisting of the destroyers Arashi and Nowaki, and the heavy cruiser Maya. Only one member of her crew survived.

According to P.C. Boer, "In the night of 28 February on 1 March 1942, in the middle of the 'wet' monsoon season, the Japanese troops landed in Java and the last phase in the final battle for the Netherlands East Indies began." The Japanese Sixteenth Army, composed of Masao Maruyama's 2nd Division and the Shōji Division, landed 23,500 men in western Java near Merak, in the Bay of Bantam, and near Eretan Wetan. They were opposed by 27,000 KNIL and allied troops. The landings at Eretan Wetan threatened Bandoeng, location of the KNIL logistic center with its warehouses and workshops. The 48th Division objective was Rembang and the Cepu Oil Field. The Sakaguchi Detachment objective was Cilacap.

== West Java campaign ==
On 23 January, invasion plans were agreed in Manila between the Japanese 3rd Fleet and the Sixteenth Army under Hitoshi Imamura.

The invasion convoy consisted of 56 transport ships carrying troops from the 16th Army Headquarters, the 2nd Division, and the 3rd Mixed Regiment. It departed Cam Ranh Bay at 10:00 on 18 February, with Commander-in-Chief Lieutenant General Hitoshi Imamura embarked aboard the transport ship Ryūjō Maru. Escort duties were assigned to a force under the command of Rear Admiral Kenzaburo Hara.

At 01:30 on 1 March, the Japanese 2nd Division, led by Yumio Nasu's 2nd Infantry, landed on the Merak coast, followed by Kyūsaku Fukushima's 4th Infantry Regiment and Hanshichi Satō's 29th Infantry Regiment. The division’s objective was to advance rapidly toward Buitenzorg and split Allied forces positioned between Batavia and Bandung.

Also on 1 March, Toshinari Shōji's detachment captured Kalidjati air base following its landing at Eretan Wetan. The 3rd Hiko Dan transferred fighter and ground-attack aircraft to the airfield the following day.

By 2 March, the Nasu Detachment had reached the area between Lawangtaji and Bunar, the Fukushima Detachment had advanced to Pamarayan, the Satō Detachment held Kragilan, and the 2nd Division command post had been established at Petir. This was followed by the Battle of Leuwiliang.

On 3 March, Japanese forces bombed Andir airfield, eliminating KNIL air support.

On 4 March, the Shōji Detachment captured Purwakarta, while Allied forces in Batavia and Buitenzorg withdrew toward Bandung.

By 9 March, the Nasu Detachment had reached Cimahi and the Fukushima Detachment was in Cibarusa. On the same day, Lieutenant General Hein ter Poorten’s deputy, Major General Jacob Pesman, issued a radio broadcast announcing that Japanese forces had broken through into the Bandung plateau and secured air superiority, making continued resistance untenable. He stated that ceasefire negotiations had been initiated and relayed Japanese demands issued on 8 March, including overall surrender, immediate cessation of hostilities, disarmament of all forces by 12:00 on 9 March, prohibition of destruction of military infrastructure, and restrictions on foreign communications. Following acceptance of these terms, the Shōji Detachment entered Bandung.

== East Java campaign ==
On 1 March, Abe Kōichi's 48th Infantry Group started landing at Kragan. The right wing consisting of Imai Kazufumi's 1st Taiwan Infantry Regiment landing at 0345, followed by the left wing of Yanagi Isamu's 47th Infantry Regiment at 0400. The Imai Unit proceeded to Rembang, the Tanaka Regiment towards Cepu, the Kitamura Unit towards Bojonegoro, and the Matsumoto, Yamamoto, and Kanauiji Echelons of the Sakaguchi Detachment towards Blora.

The 3rd (Motorised) Cavalry Squadron of the 1st Dutch KNIL Cavalry Regiment, under the command of Ritmeester C.W. de Iongh, resisted the landing force but was quickly subdued.

On 2 March, the Imai Unit captured Rembang and the Tanaka Unit captured Cepu. On 3 March, the Kitamura Unit captured Bojonegoro. On the night of 4 March, the Japanese successfully bridged the Solo River and continued their advance. On 5 March, the Abe Unit crossed the Brantas River and captured the bridge at Kediri. On 5 March, Sakaguchi units entered Yogyakarta. On 8 March, the Japanese entered Cilacap and Surabaya.

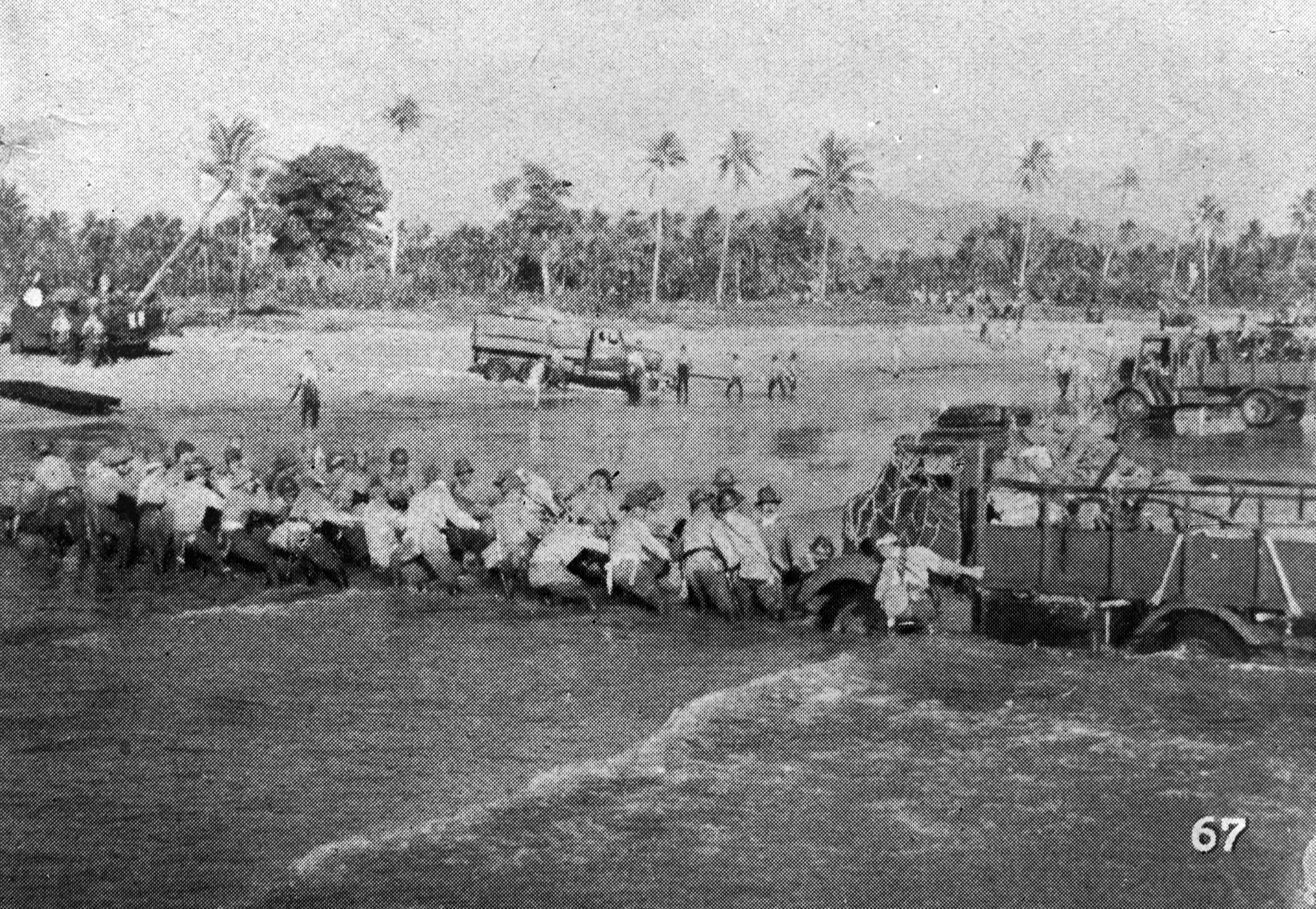
Japanese invasion of Java, Tropenmuseum collection

== Aftermath ==
On 12 March, 8,000 British and Australian army troops surrendered in the mountains east of Bandung.

Allied prisoners of war totaled 82,618, including 66,219 Dutch East Indies Armed Forces, 4,890 Australian Armed Forces, 10,626 British Armed Forces, and 883 U.S. Armed Forces.

== Order of battle ==
=== American-British-Dutch-Australian Command (ABDA) ===
Koninklijk Nederlands Indisch Leger (KNIL Army): Lieutenant-General Hein Ter Poorten

- 1st KNIL Infantry Division: Major-General Wijbrandus Schilling
- 2nd KNIL Infantry Division: Major-General Pierre Antoine Cox
- 3rd KNIL Infantry Division: Major-General Gustav Adolf Ilgen
- British troops (ca. 5,500 men): Major-General Sir Hervey Degge Wilmot Sitwell
- US troops (ca. 750 men:) Major-General Julian Francis Barnes
- Australian troops (ca. 3,000 men): Brigadier Arthur S. Blackburn.

=== Imperial Japanese Army ===
16th Army: General Hitoshi Imamura

- 2nd Division (Maruyama Masao)
  - 2nd Company and 4th Company of 2nd Tank Regiment (21 Type 97 Medium Tanks)
  - 2nd Recon Regiment (16 Type 97 Tankettes)
- 48th Division (Yuitsu Tsuchihashi)
  - 3rd Company of 4th Tank Regiment (10 Type 95 Light Tanks)
  - 3rd Company of 2nd Tank Regiment (10 Type 97 Medium Tanks, 5 M3 Light Tanks)
  - 48th Recon Regiment (16 Type 97 Tankettes)
- Sakaguchi Detachment (Shizuo Sakaguchi)
  - 56th Infantry Group Tankette Unit (8 Type 97 Tankettes)
- Shoji Detachment
  - 1st Company of 4th Tank Regiment (10 Type 95 Light Tanks)
- North Sumatra Campaign
  - 2nd Company of the 4th Tank Regiment (10 Type 95 Light Tanks)

2nd Division: Lt. Gen. Masao Maruyama

- Nasu Detachment: Maj. Gen. Yumio Nasu
  - 16th Infantry Regiment
  - 1st Battalion of 2nd Field Artillery Regiment
  - 1st Company of 2nd Engineer Regiment
  - Two motor transport companies
- Fukushima Detachment: Col. Kyusaku Fukushima
  - 4th Infantry Regiment
  - 2nd Battalion of 2nd Field Artillery Regiment
  - 5th Anti-Tank Battalion
  - 2nd Company of 2nd Engineer Regiment
- Sato Detachment: Col. Hanshichi Sato
  - 29th Infantry Regiment
  - 2nd Tank Regiment
  - 1st Company of 2nd Field Artillery Regiment
  - 2nd Engineer Regiment
- Shoji Detachment: Col. Toshishige Shoji
  - 3rd mixed Regiment (formed ad hoc from 230th infantry regiment)
  - One mountain artillery battalion
  - One engineer company
  - One anti-tank battalion
  - One light tank company
  - One anti-aircraft battery
  - Two independent engineer companies
  - One platoon of the Bridge Material Company
  - One motor Transport Company
  - Part of the 40th Anchorage Headquarters
  - Part of the Airfield Battalion

48th Division: Major-General Yuitsu Tsuchihashi

- Imai Unit (right wing): Colonel Hifumi Imai, commander of the 1st Formosan Infantry Regiment
  - 1st Formosan Infantry Regiment
  - One mountain artillery battalion
  - One engineer company
- Abe Unit (left wing): Major-General Koichi Abe
  - 48th Infantry Group Headquarters
  - 47th Infantry Regiment
  - One mountain artillery battalion
  - One engineer company
- Tanaka Unit (Tjepoe Raiding Unit): Colonel Tohru Tanaka
  - 2nd Formosan Infantry Regiment
  - One mountain artillery battalion
  - One engineer company
- Kitamura Unit (Bodjonegoro Raiding Unit): Lieutenant Colonel Kuro Kitamura
  - 48th Reconnaissance Regiment

Sakaguchi Detachment: Major-General Shizuo Sakaguchi

- Yamamoto Unit: Colonel Yamamoto
  - 1st Battalion of the 124th Infantry Regiment
- Kaneuji Unit: Major Kaneuji
  - 2nd Battalion of the 124th Infantry Regiment
- Matsumoto Unit: Lieutenant Colonel Matsumoto
  - 3rd Battalion of the 124th Infantry Regiment

== See also ==
- Lost Battalion (Pacific, World War II)

== Notes ==
- Several city names are dual written because of
  - different name given by Dutch and by Indonesian now, for example Batavia is now called Jakarta and Buitenzorg is now called Bogor.
  - different grammatic rule from old van Ophuijsen, Soewandi until the latest "Ejaan Yang Disempurnakan" (The Improved Grammar). tj → c, DJ → j, oe → u, j → y
- The documents are rare and accurate casualties among Allied and Japanese combatans are difficult to estimate because of
  - chaotic situation then, no time to record log or images; the Japanese troops rushed rapidly, only 3 months, the whole Dutch East Indies were seized.
  - most documents were burnt and destroyed by the Allies to keep secrecy from Japanese occupation.
  - other available documents and images, which not yet publicised, were mostly written in Dutch and Japanese.
