= Leuwiliang =

- Town and District
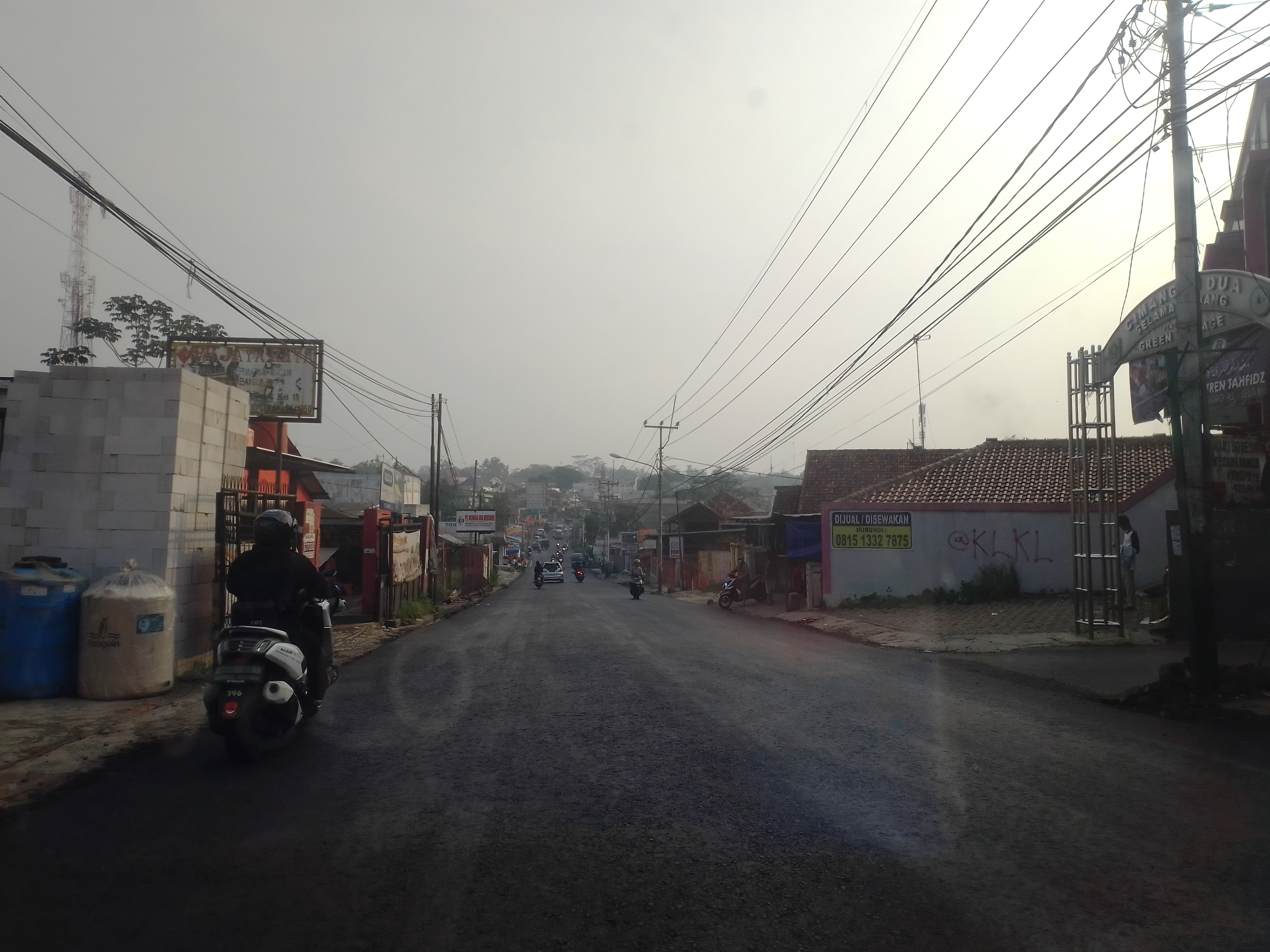
- Main road of Leuwiliang

- Location in Bogor Regency, Java and Indonesia Leuwiliang (Java) Leuwiliang (Indonesia)
- Coordinates: 6.574158°S 106.632011°E
- Country: Indonesia
- Region: Java
- Province: West Java
- Regency: Bogor Regency

Area
  - Total: 62.21 km^{2} (24.02 sq mi)
- Elevation: 215 m (705 ft)

Population (mid 2024 estimate)
  - Total: 138,094
  - Density: 2,220/km^{2} (5,749/sq mi)
- Time zone: UTC+7 (IWST)
- Postcode: 166xx
- Area code: (+62) 251
- Vehicle registration: F
- Villages: 11
- Website: kecamatanleuwiliang.bogorkab.go.id

Leuwiliang is a town (kelurahan) and an administrative district (Indonesian: kecamatan) in the Bogor Regency of the province of West Java on Java in Indonesia. It is within that part of the regency that was projected in 2013 to be split off to form a putative new West Bogor Regency, but still remaining part of Jakarta's metropolitan area.

Leuwiliang District covers a land area of 62.21 km^{2}, and had a population of 113,280 at the 2010 Census and 124,760 at the 2020 Census; the official estimate as at mid 2024 was 138,094 (comprising 71,372 males and 66,722 females). The administrative centre is at the town of Leuwimekar, and the district is sub-divided into eleven villages (desa), all sharing the postcode of 16640, as listed below with their areas and populations as at mid 2024.

Kode Wilayah	Name of desa	Area in km^{2}	Population mid 2024 estimate
32.01.14.2002	Purasari	6.32	14,949
32.01.14.2008	Puraseda	3.90	10,615
32.01.14.2003	Karyasari	6.86	9,965
32.01.14.2004	Pabangbon	11.92	7,434
32.01.14.2005	Karacak	7.10	13,352
32.01.14.2006	Barengkok	4.50	13,478
32.01.14.2010	Cibeber II	5.14	11,253
32.01.14.2009	Cibeber I	6.16	12,219
32.01.14.2007	Leuwimekar	2.44	14,544
32.01.14.2001	Leuwiliang (town)	2.97	15,275
32.01.14.2011	Karehkel	4.20	15,010
32.01.14	Totals	62.21	138,094

== Gallery ==
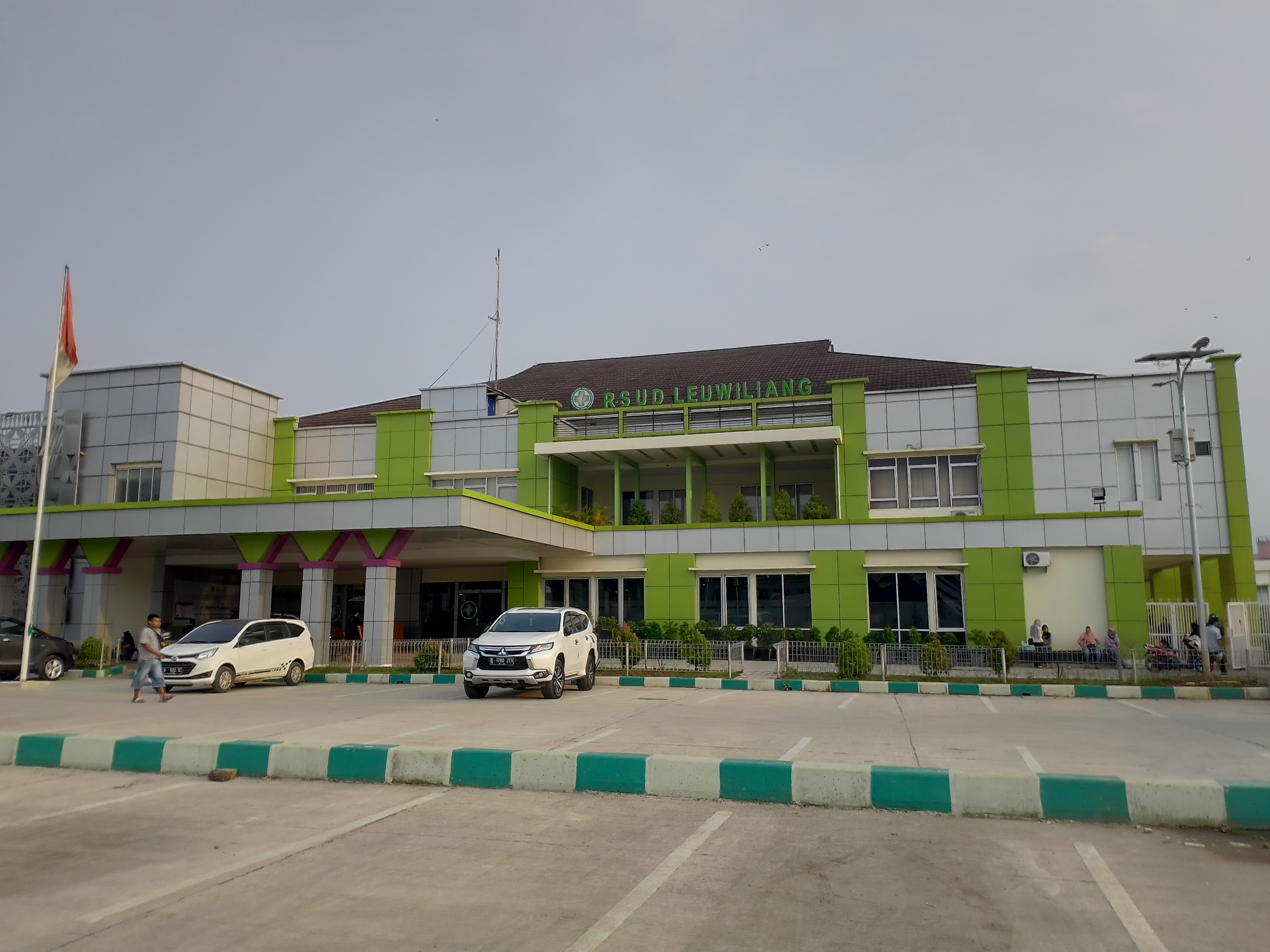
Leuwiliang General Hospital

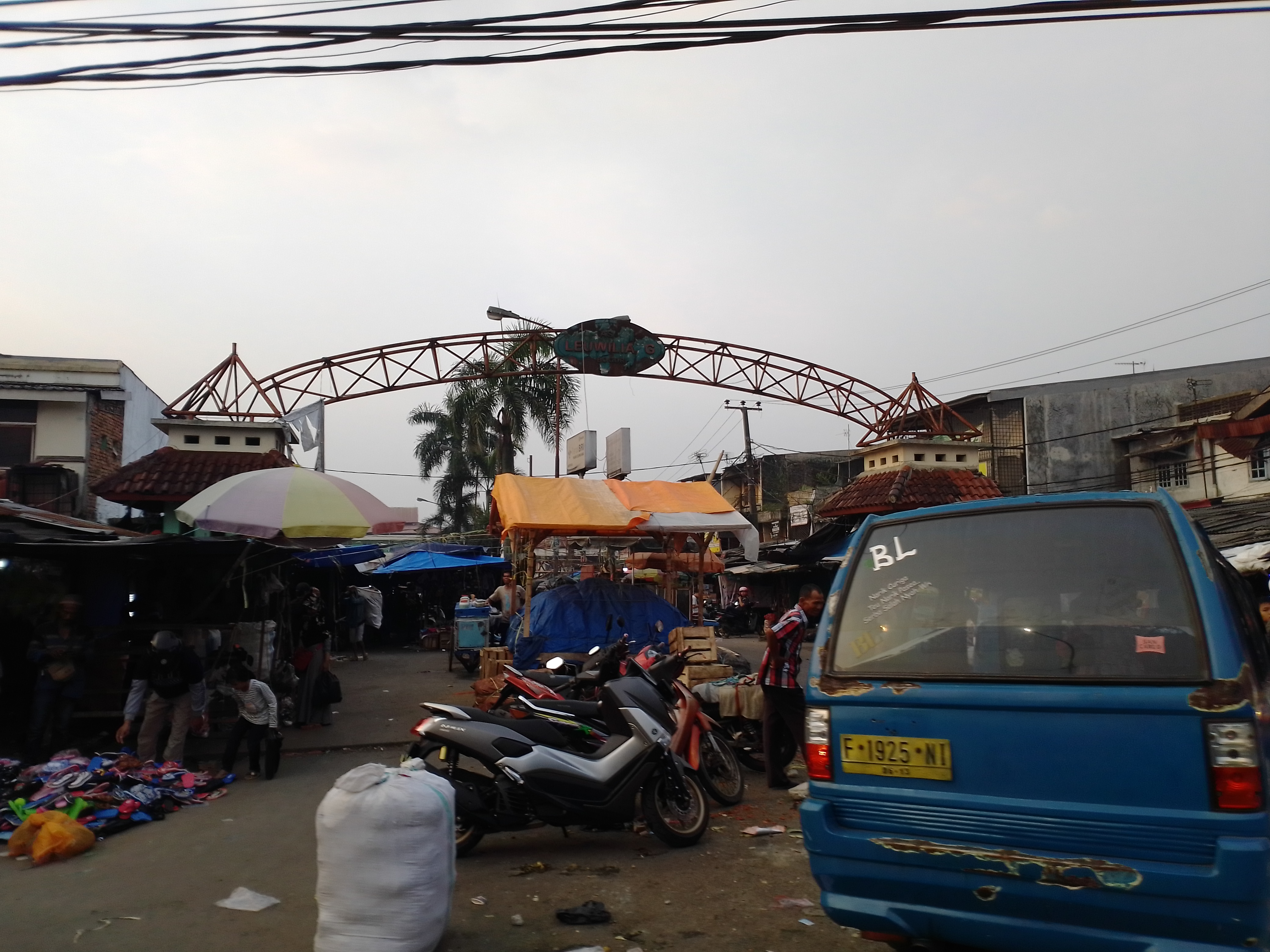
Leuwiliang Market
